= History of the Republican People's Party =

Aspect of Turkish political history

The Six Arrows, the symbol of the Republican People's Party

The Republican People's Party (CHP) was founded by Mustafa Kemal Atatürk in 1923, it is the oldest political party of the Republic of Turkey. It has its roots in the progressive Young Turks movement and the Committee of Union and Progress (in power from 1908 to 1918). The CHP was a vehicle for Atatürk's reforms and the center of the one-party period (1923–1946). The party loosened its grip on power by permitting other political parties to compete in the 1946 election, and initiated a peaceful transition of power to the center-right Democrat Party after losing the 1950 election.

Long considered the party of the state, in the 1965 general election the CHP adopted social democracy to its party platform, positioning itself on the center-left. It was banned by the military junta of 1980 for 12 years, until it was reestablished by Deniz Baykal in 1992. Since 2002 the CHP was the main opposition to Recep Tayyip Erdoğan and the AKP, until the absolute nullity crisis of 2026.

== Formation ==
=== Origins ===
During the Turkish War of Independence, regional patriotic organizations known as Defence of Rights Associations were founded in Anatolia and Rumelia to protest Allied occupation of Turkish territory and safeguard Turkish-Muslim interests. Most members of these associations were previously affiliated with the Committee of Union and Progress, a progressive organization which initiated the Young Turk revolution. After introducing some initial reforms, under the pressures of nationalism and war it later transformed into a dictatorial Turkish nationalist party. The CUP governed the Ottoman Empire from 1908 to 1918, the years 1913–1918 as a dictatorship.

=== Association for the Defence of National Rights of Anatolia and Rumelia ===
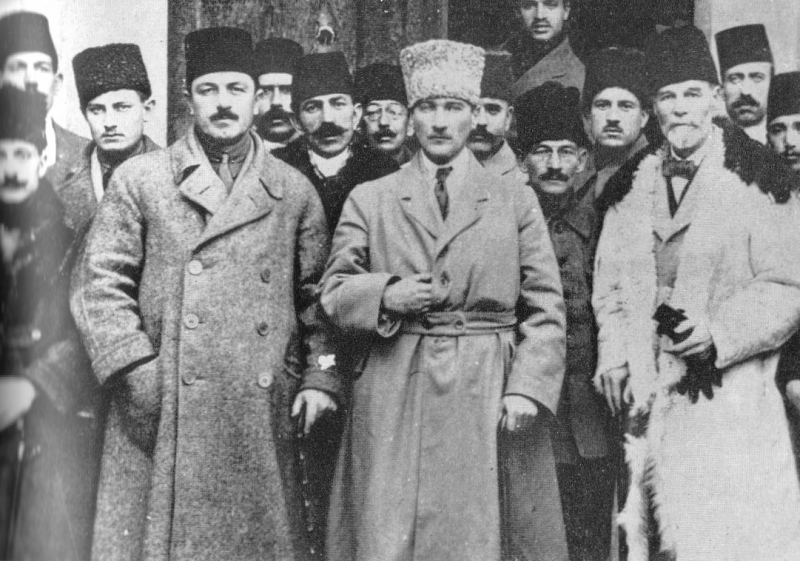
Delegates to the Sivas Congress, including Rauf Orbay, Kemal Atatürk, and Ahmet Rüstem Bey

In the Sivas Congress of 4 –11 September 1919 Mustafa Kemal (Atatürk) and his colleagues formed the Association for the Defence of National Rights of Anatolia and Rumelia (Anadolu ve Rumeli Müdâfaa-i Hukuk Cemiyeti, A-RMHC) which united the regional Defence of Rights Associations and allowed Atatürk to better coordinate nationalist activities in Anatolia. Most members of the A-RMHC, including Atatürk, were previously members of the CUP. The CHP considers the Sivas Congress its first ordinary congress.

=== Establishment ===
On 23 April 1920, the Government of the Grand National Assembly was established in Ankara by Atatürk as a revolutionary government opposed to the collaborationist government in Istanbul. The Grand National Assembly held an election, which the A-RMHC won uncontested. After GNA forces militarily defeated Greece, France, and Armenia, they overthrew the Ottoman government and abolished the monarchy. The opposition to Kemal in the parliament united under the name "Second Group for Defence of the Rights", often shortened simply to "Second Group" (the followers of Mustafa Kemal were later called "First Group", and were in the majority). In June 1923, new elections were held so Mustafa Kemal could ratify the Treaty of Lausanne with a more unanimous parliament. The 1923 elections were a victory for the First Group and represented the liquidation of the Second Group. On 9 September 1923, the A-RMHC was transformed into a political party called the People's Party, soon changing its name to Republican People's Party (First Cumhuriyet Halk Fırkası, CHF, and then Cumhuriyet Halk Partisi, CHP). With the unanimity of this second parliament, the republic was proclaimed with Atatürk as its first president, the Treaty of Lausanne was ratified, and the Caliphate was abolished the year after.

== One-party period under Atatürk: 1923–1938 ==
=== Consolidating power ===
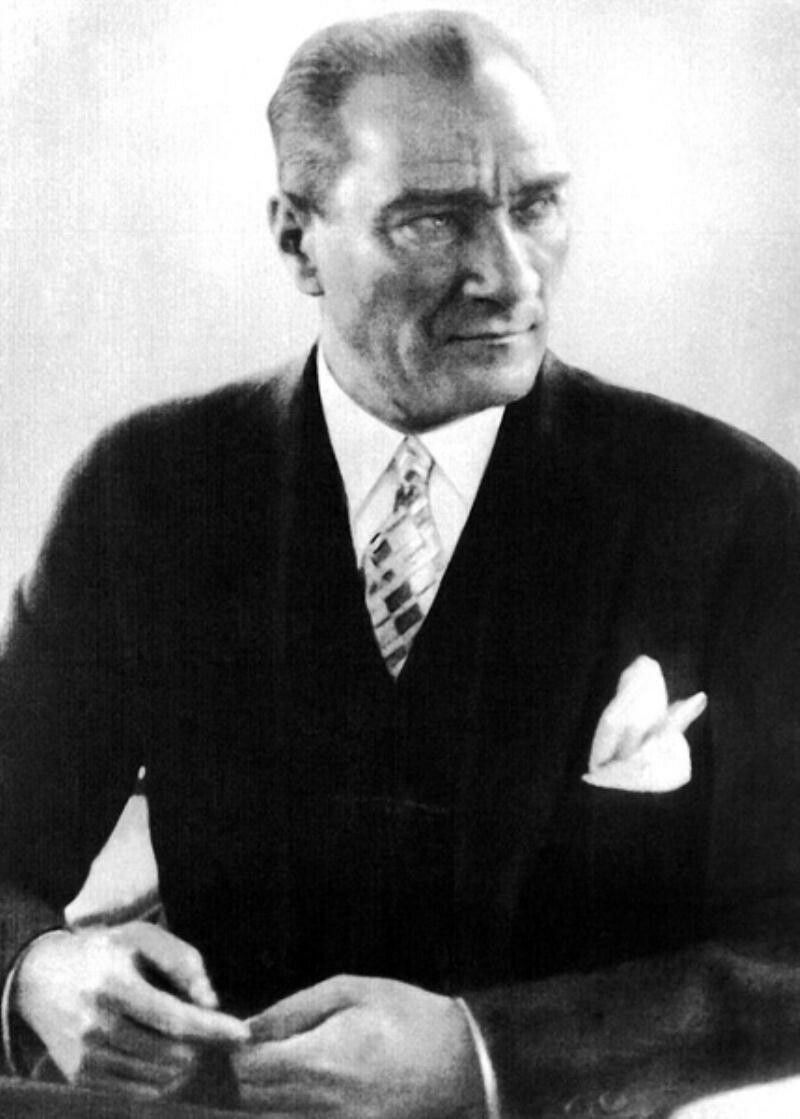
Mustafa Kemal Atatürk, founder of the Republican People's Party, president of the Republic of Turkey 1923–1938

In 1924, after the short-period of one-party rule, many of Mustafa Kemal's ex-colleagues, including Rauf (Orbay), Kâzım Karabekir, Ali Fuad (Cebesoy) and others founded a right-wing opposition party called Progressive Republican Party. Among their grievances were their growing loss of power, their opposition to the short period of a one-party rule's revolutionary activities, etc. After the foundation of an opposition party, the People's Party changed its name to "Republican People's Party". The life of the Progressive Republican Party was short. In 1925, the Kurdish lead Sheikh Said rebellion sparked in the east of Turkey. The Progressive Republican Party faced accusations of their involvement in the rebellion and as well in an alleged assassination attempt against Mustafa Kemal. On 5 June it was banned by the government, and Karabekir and many members of the party were court-martialed and imprisoned. Martial law was declared, all political parties except the CHP were banned, and all newspapers beyond state approved papers were banned (this ban would be lifted by 1930). Republican Turkey was the third one-party state of Interwar Europe, after the Soviet Union and Fascist Italy. For the next two decades Turkey was under a paternalist one-party authoritarian dictatorship, with one interruption; another brief experiment of opposition politics through the formation of the Liberal Republican Party.

=== CHP in power ===
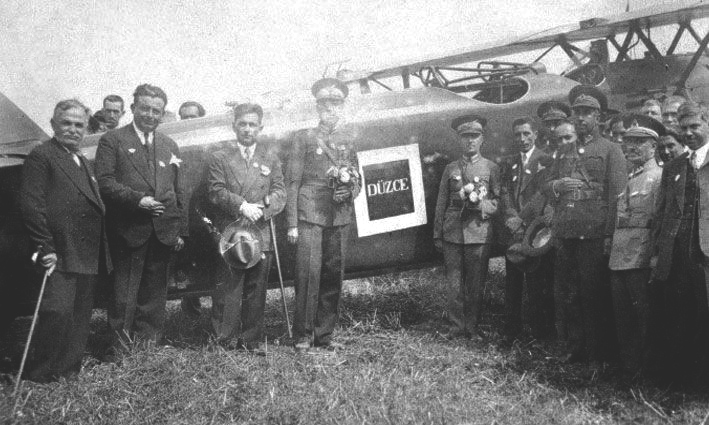
Members of the CHP in Düzce, 1930s

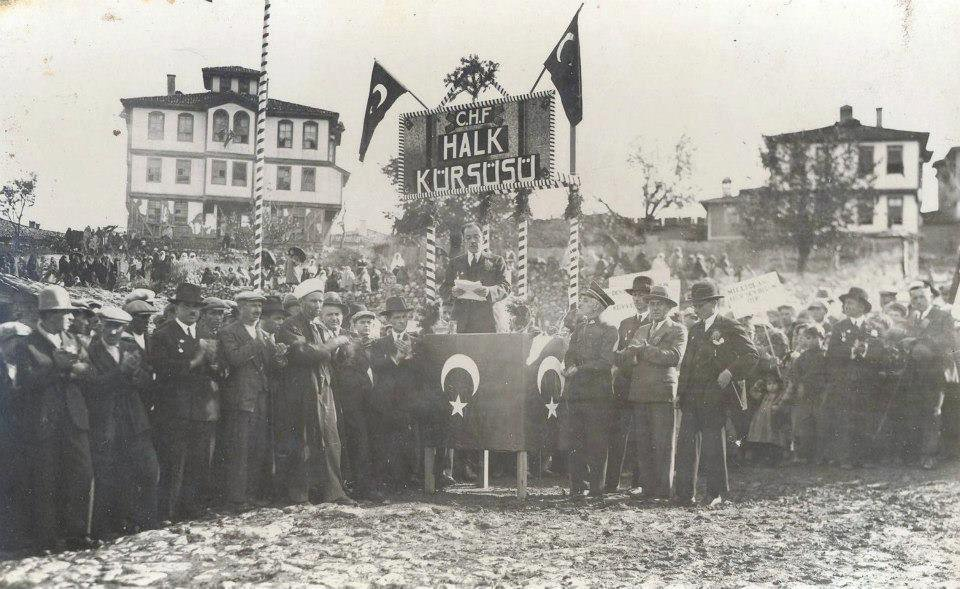
CHP (then known with the acronym CHF) People's Platforms

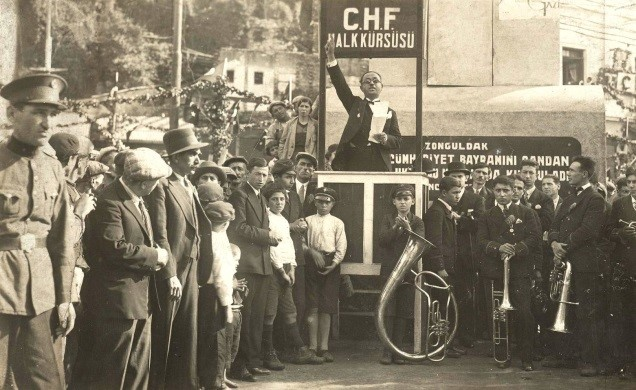
CHP People's Platforms, Zonguldak

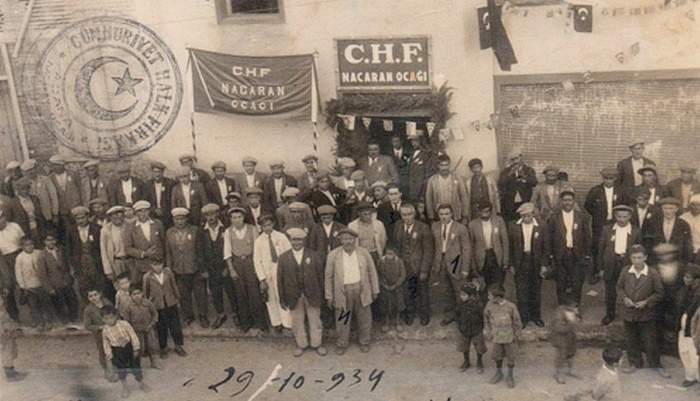
CHP Nacaran Organization

In the period of 1924–1946, the Republican People's Party introduced sweeping social, cultural, educational, economic, and legal reforms that transformed Turkey into a republican nation state. Such reforms included the adoption of Swiss and Italian legal and penal codes, the acceleration of industrialization, land reform and rural development programs, nationalization of foreign assets, forced assimilation policies, strict secularism, women's suffrage, and switching written Turkish from Perso-Arabic script into Latin script, to name a few.

In the party's second ordinary congress in 1927 (the first official congress after the 1919 Sivas Congress), the CHP was defined as a republican, populist, and nationalist political organization. Atatürk was designated its permanent chairman, and his prime minister İsmet İnönü deputy chairman. Atatürk went on to deliver a thirty-six hour long speech (known as Nutuk, or "The Speech") of his account of the pivotal last ten years of Turkish history, which ended with an appeal to the Turkish youth to protect the Republic. The speech's narrative has served as the basis of a growing cult of personality associated with Atatürk and the historiography of the transition to the Republic from the Sultanate. However this cult of personality would be further fostered after the CHP's fall from power in the 1950s, under the Democrat Party.

With the onset of the Great Depression, the party somewhat divided into statist and liberal factions, being championed by Prime Minister İsmet İnönü and finance minister Celâl Bayar respectively. Atatürk mostly favored İnönü's policies, so economic development of the early republic was largely confined to state-owned enterprises and five-year plans. Further left-wing Republicans centered around the Kadro circle were deemed to be impermissible, so they were closed down. In 1930 Atatürk attempted to address the economic crisis by reintroducing multiparty politics to Turkey (Turkey previously had a pluralistic political climate during the Second Constitutional Era of 1908–1913). The Liberal Republican Party (SCF) was established with a liberal economic agenda, and led by Atatürk's close friend, Ali Fethi Okyar. The 1930 Turkish local elections were the first multiparty elections held in the Turkish Republic, though there were rumors the CHP won many races with electoral fraud. However the SCF was pressured to disband by its founders soon after the İzmir rally, which was showing signs of escalating into an uprising against the government. The demise of the Liberal Republican Party lead to a more controlled political climate.

The Six Arrows, the symbol of the Republican People's Party

The CHP held its third ordinary convention the next year. It clarified its ideology with 'The Six Arrows': republicanism, reformism, laïcité (secularism), populism, nationalism, and statism. They defined Atatürk's principles, which were soon known as Kemalism, and were codified into the constitution on 5 February 1937. A community organization attached to the party was founded: Halkevleri (People's Homes). It was decided in the convention that Christians and Jews should be accepted as real Turks as long as they adhere to the national ideal and use the Turkish language.

With the Ottomanism question settled, Turkish nation-building was prioritized which saw nationalist propaganda, language purification, and pseudo-scientific racial theories propagated (such as the Sun Language Theory and Turkish History Thesis). Opposition to Atatürk's reforms were suppressed by various coercive institutions and military force, at the expense of religious conservatives, minorities, and communists. The party-state cracked down on Kurdish resistance to assimilation, suppressing multiple rebellions and encouraging the denial of their existence. Anti-clerical and anti-veiling campaigns peaked in the mid-1930s. Alevis were able to make great strides in their emancipation, and to this day make up a core constituency of the CHP.

The First Five-Year Plan was implemented in 1934 largely financed with Soviet loans. Priority was given to heavy industry and railway construction. Desiring a more liberal economic system, Atatürk dismissed İnönü as Prime Minister in 1937 and appointed Celâl Bayar, the founder of the first Turkish commercial bank, Türkiye İş Bankası, as prime minister, thus beginning a decades long rivalry between Bayar and İnönü.

== One-party period under İnönü: 1938–1946 ==
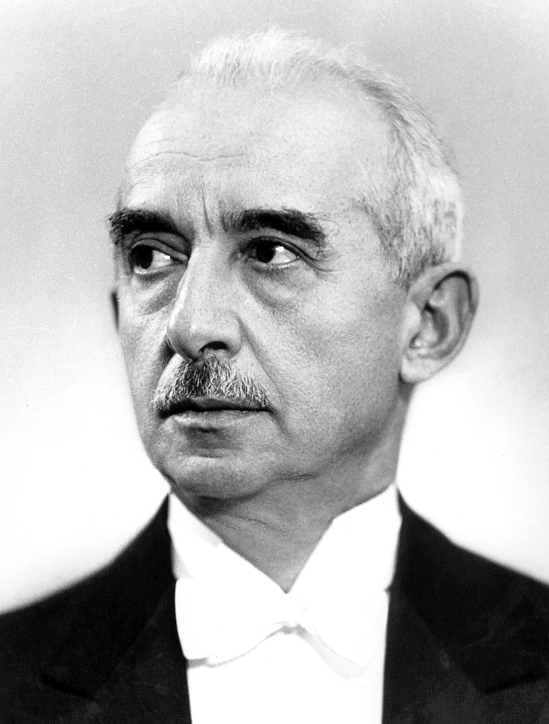
İsmet İnönü, president of the Republic of Turkey 1938–1950, leader of the CHP until 1972

The day after Atatürk's death, his ally İsmet İnönü was unanimously elected president. During its first extraordinary congress on 26 December 1938, İsmet İnönü was elected as the CHP's "permanent chairman". The delegates awarded Atatürk the title "eternal chief", and İnönü the title "national chief". In the fifth ordinary congress in 1939, the CHP established an "Independent group" in parliament to serve as opposition. İnönü dismissed Bayar's government because of differences between the two on economic policy in 1939. İnönü was an avowed statist, while Bayar wished for a more liberal economy. He was replaced by Refik Saydam, and then Şükrü Saracoğlu upon his passing in 1942. Turkey's early industrialization accelerated under İnönü but the onset of World War II disrupted economic growth.

İnönü's presidency saw heavy state involvement in the economy and further rural development initiatives such as Village Institutes, a program conceived by education minister Hasan Âli Yücel. Various scientists, writers, teachers, and doctors graduated from Village Institutes; and supported Turkey's modernization efforts, before the program was terminated by Adnan Menderes's DP government. UNICEF regards the Village Institutes project as exemplary and has placed its curriculum under protection.

On foreign affairs, the Hatay State was annexed and İnönü adopted a policy of neutrality despite attempts by the Allies and Axis powers to bring Turkey into World War II, during which extensive conscription and rationing was implemented to ensure an armed neutrality. Non-Muslims especially suffered when the CHP government implemented discriminatory "wealth taxes," labor battalions, and peon camps. Internal opposition to Turkish neutrality came from ultra-nationalist circles and factions of the military that wished to incorporate the Turkic-populated areas of the Soviet Union by allying with Germany. This almost erupted into a coup d'état against the government. Leading pan-Turkists including Alparslan Türkeş, Nihal Atsız, and Şaik Gökyay were arrested and sentenced to time in prison in the Racism-Turanism trials. The CHP therefore purged itself of ultra-nationalists. With the war's end, Turkey was threatened by the Soviet Union in the Turkish Straits crisis, compelling Turkey to move closer to the United States.

== İnönü's continued chairmanship during the multiparty period: 1946–1972 ==
=== Democratization ===
The period between 1946 and 1950 saw İnönü prepare for a pluralistic Turkey allied with the West. Factionalism between the statists and the liberals and again broke out over land reform. The Motion with Four Signatures, a petition for free debate in the party, resulted in the resignation of CHP members, most prominently Celâl Bayar, who then founded the Democrat Party (DP). İnönü welcomed the new opposition party and initiated several reforms to democratize the country: he dropped his title of Permanent Chairman, abolished certain taxes, permitted labor unions, and called for a multi-party general election in 1946 – the first multi-party general election in the country's history, in a contest between the DP and CHP. The result was a victory for the CHP, which won 395 of the 465 seats, amid criticism that the election did not live up to democratic standards.

Under pressure by the new conservative parliamentary opposition and the United States, the party became especially anti-communist, and retracted some of its rural development programs and many of the party's anti-clerical policies. The CHP's 7th ordinary congress began on 17 November 1947, and lasted 19 days. At the congress, the party's General Executive Board was abolished and replaced by a 40-member Party Council, whose members were to be elected by the congress. The congress paved the way for a shift toward liberal economic policies and a relaxation of policies regarding religion.

İnönü attempted make his title of president an apolitical head of state and have his prime ministers deal with political matters. Bayar threatened to have his party walk out of parliament if they did not have some of their demands met by Prime Minister Recep Peker, who proved to be too uncompromising with the opposition. İnönü failed to have the two make amends, and conspired to have Peker overthrown by Hasan Saka in 1947, who governed for two years until his resignation in 1949. Şemsettin Günaltay, a theologian, was appointed to the Prime Ministry and relaxed secularist policies.

A free and fair general election was held in 1950 that led to the CHP losing power to the DP. İnönü presided over a peaceful transition of power, but stayed on as CHP leader. The 1950 election marked the end of the CHP's last majority government. The party has not been able to regain a parliamentary majority in any subsequent election since.

=== Opposition to the Democrat Party ===
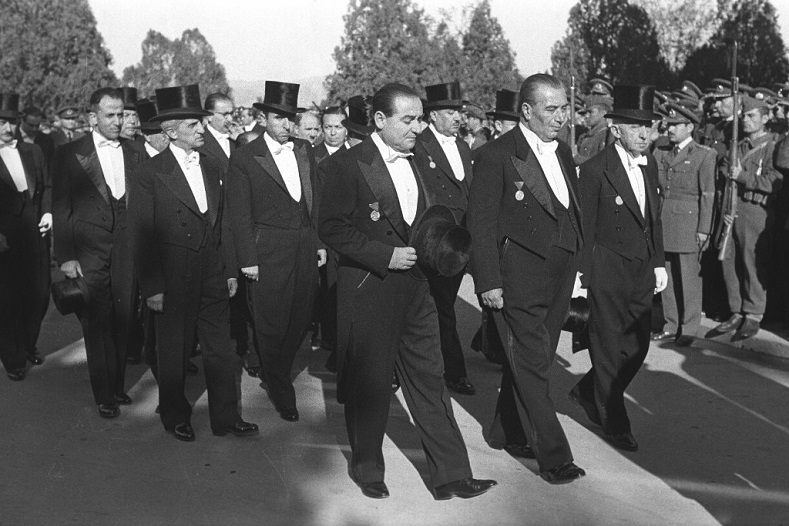
Atatürk's remains were transferred from the Ankara Ethnography Museum to Anıtkabir in 1953. The procession during the transfer ceremony included Prime Minister Adnan Menderes, Speaker of the Parliament Refik Koraltan, CHP Chairman İsmet İnönü, Minister of National Defense Kenan Yılmaz and Minister of Public Works Kemal Zeytinoğlu

In the 1950 general election, the DP won with 53% of the vote against the CHP's 39%. Due to the winner-take-all system in place during the 1950s, the center-right DP electoral victories translated into large parliamentary majorities, despite reasonably close elections. Bayar was elected president, and tasked Adnan Menderes to be his Prime Minister and new leader of the DP. Though the DP and CHP were rivals, the DP was founded by conservative Republicans who mostly continued Kemalist policies.

The DP was reelected to power in the 1954 general election, after a strong economy delivered by Marshall Aid moneys gave the party 57% of the vote to the CHP's 35%.

Despite its name, the Democrat Party became increasingly authoritarian towards the opposition as its government entrenched itself. In 1953 certain CHP assets were seized by the Treasury and the economy declined. The 1955 Istanbul Pogrom was a scandal for the DP, and pro-CHP journalists began to be prosecuted. The CHP resolved to cooperate with other opposition parties: the Liberty Party and the Republican Nation Party for the 1957 election, though the DP government blocked electoral alliances for that election. The DP won another parliamentary majority with 48% of the vote to the CHP's 41%, amid growing concerns about the DP's authoritarian tendencies in government.

Though the CHP would turn into a social democratic party in 1965, its left-ward trend began in the 50s. During the ninth CHP Congress in 1951, the youth branch and the women's branch of the CHP were formed. In its 1953 congress, a bicameral system, the establishment of a Constitutional Court, electoral security, judicial independence, the freedom to form trade unions and vocational organizations, and the right to strike for workers was added to the party program.

In the spring of 1959, CHP members launched an election campaign covering the provinces of Western Anatolia, called the "Great Offensive" after the Turkish nationalist offensive against the Greeks in the last stages of the Greco-Turkish War. The country was in a state of high tension. During the campaign, İnönü was harassed by DP supporters tacitly supported by the government. Ulus, the CHP's official newspaper, was banned. When İnönü attempted to visit Kayseri his train was stopped, however he managed to reach the city and bypass the barricades that had been set up. On 18 April 1960, the DP established the Committee of Inquest, a parliamentary committee made up of DP MPs with the power to prosecute and imprison other MPs. The first decision of the committee was to ban political activities and censor the press. İnönü criticized the committee for violating separation of powers. The parliament voted to suspend İnönü from attending twelve parliamentary sessions. The CHP parliamentary group, protesting the decision, was forcibly removed from parliament by the police. Student protests against the government took place in Istanbul and Ankara between April 28 and 30, and martial law was declared in both cities. Further unrest occurred during the 555k protests. Menderes held the CHP and İnönü responsible for the unrest.

=== 1960 Coup ===
On 27 May 1960 junior officers of the Turkish Armed Forces staged a coup d'état, taking control of the government and arresting prominent members of the DP, including Bayar and Menderes. General Cemal Gürsel assumed the roles of Head of State, Minister of National Defense, and Prime Minister, presiding over a military junta called the "National Unity Committee". Efforts began to draft a new democratic constitution to fix the faults of the old political order. An interim House of Representatives drafted a new constitution for Turkey. The 1961 constitution is widely accepted as to be the most liberal and democratic constitution in Turkish history. The winner-take-all electoral system was immediately abolished, and a proportional representation system was introduced. The new constitution brought Turkey a bicameral parliament, composed of the Senate of the Republic as the upper chamber, and the National Assembly as the lower chamber. A Constitutional Court was established.

The National Unity Committee banned the DP and established trials to punish DP leaders for their authoritarianism and corruption. CHP leader İsmet İnönü sent a letter to Gürsel raising concerns regarding the legal process, calling on the death sentences of the ousted government ministers to be commuted in order to calm social tensions following the coup. On 16 and 17 September 1961, ousted prime minister Adnan Menderes, Foreign Minister Fatin Rüştü Zorlu, and Finance Minister Hasan Polatkan were hanged in the İmralı island prison. President Bayar's death sentence was commuted to life imprisonment for his old age. Nevertheless, right-wing parties have since continuously attacked the CHP for the perceived involvement of the party in the coup and the hanging of Menderes.

=== 1960–1972 ===
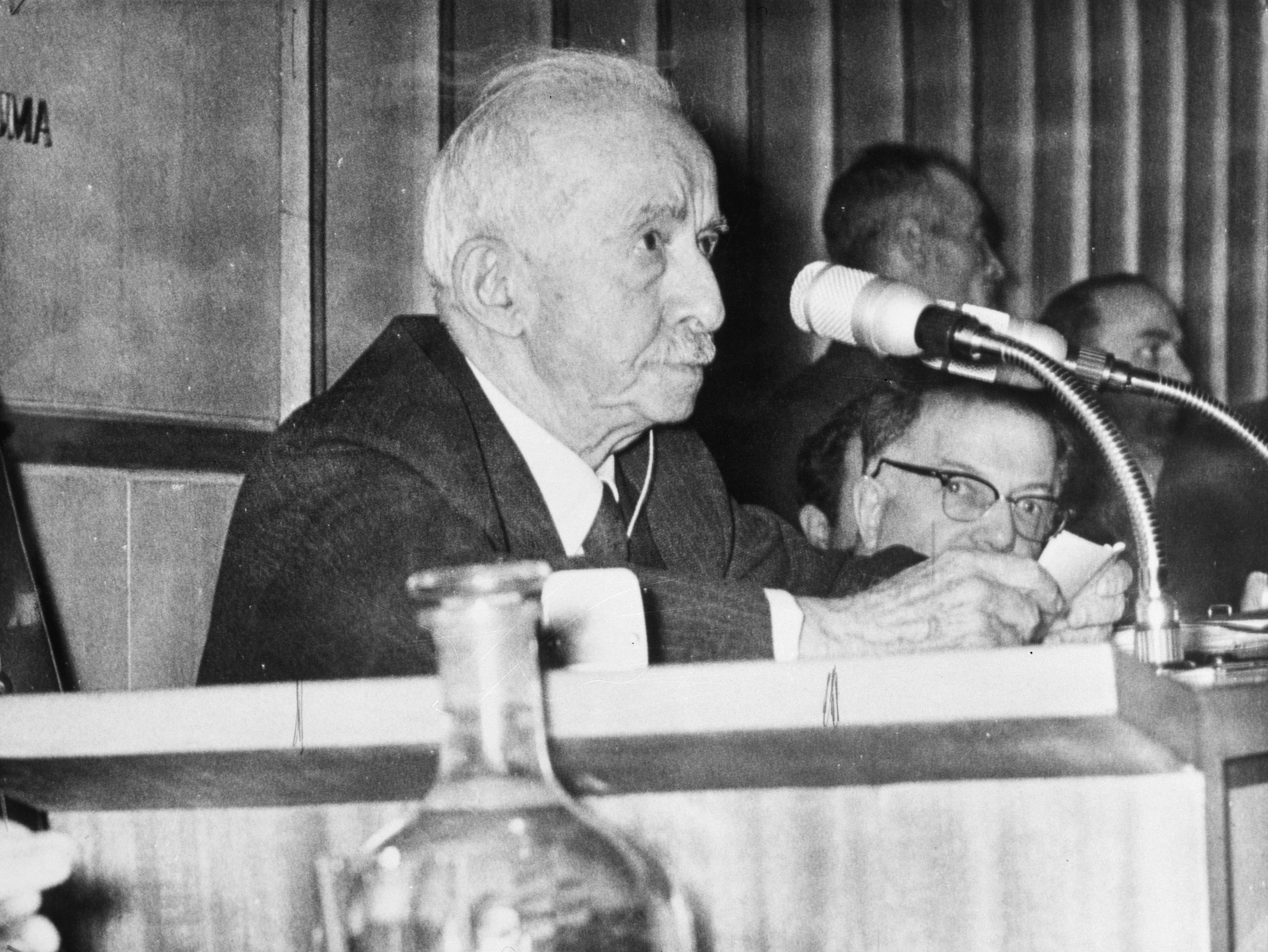
İnönü receiving an attack in parliament, 1964

With proportional representation in place, CHP emerged as the first party in the general election of 1961 with 37% of the vote in the National Assembly and 36 seats in the Senate. The Justice Party, claiming to be the successor to the DP, gained received 35% of the vote. General Gürsel was elected as President of Turkey, and tasked İnönü to form a government, who went on to form a grand coalition with the Justice Party. This was the first coalition government in Turkey, lasting until 1962 when a dispute between the CHP and the AP on the issue of amnesty for former DP members resulted in the government's dissolution. During this government Colonel Talât Aydemir attempted a military coup which failed due to the military's respect for İnönü.

İnönü next formed a three-party coalition government with the New Turkey Party (YTP) and the Republican Villagers Nation Party (CKMP), though the loss of support for the two junior parties in the 1963 local elections resulted in the government collapsing in 1963. Talât Aydemir attempted another military coup, upon its failure he was tried and executed.

İnönü's 10th government was a fragile minority government supported by independents and the YTP. Growing anti-Greek sentiment due to the Cyprus crisis lead to the government disenfranchising Greeks and deporting 50,000 Greeks to Greece. The government collapsed in February 1965 after the opposition parties in parliament united to block the CHP's budget, causing İnönü to resign as prime minister. Among other actions, İnönü's governments established the National Security Council, Turkish Statistical Institute, and Turkey's leading research institute, TÜBİTAK. Turkey signed the Ankara agreement, the first treaty of cooperation with the European Economic Community, and also strengthened ties with Iran and Pakistan. The army was modernized, and the National Intelligence Organization was founded.

The 29th government of Turkey was formed by Suat Hayri Ürgüplü, an independent who had the support of right-wing parties: Justice Party, YTP, CKMP and the Nation Party (MP). Ürgüplü's government presided over the 1965 general election. In that election, İnönü declared the CHP to be a social democratic party, "Left-of-Center". He was pressured by the Democratic Left faction of the party, led by his Labour Minister Bülent Ecevit, as well as the Workers' Party of Turkey (TİP) on its left flank. İnönü lost the election to the Justice Party's much younger chairman: Süleyman Demirel, who campaigned with the slogan "Left-of-Center is the road to Moscow." ("Ortanın Solu Moskova Yolu") and went on to form a majority government. Nevertheless, the CHP has maintained its social democratic character since.

The younger Democratic Left faction grew more powerful as Ecevit was elected secretary-general under İnönü as the old guard's influence waned. Kemalists suspicious of the CHP's Left-of-Center program defected with Turhan Feyzioğlu to form the Republican Reliance Party (CGP) in 1967. The CHP lost another general election in 1969 to the Justice Party, which expanded its majority.

As Turkey's political and economic situation deteriorated, on 12 March 1971, the Turkish Armed Forces issued a memorandum against the government, leading to the resignation of Prime Minister Demirel and the establishment of a military-backed government. Nihat Erim, a former CHP member, was tasked with forming the new government, upon which İnönü indicated his support for the government, and thus the military intervention. Ecevit denounced İnönü's decision and resigned from his party post in protest, a stunt which led to calls for İnönü's resignation in the party. Prior to the ordinary party convention scheduled for June 1972, İnönü decided to convene an extraordinary convention of the CHP on 5 May 1972. İnönü, 87 years old, suffered a heart attack the day before the convention, so the event was postponed by one day. The congress was a leadership contest between Chairman İsmet İnönü and Bülent Ecevit. In his opening address, İnönü candidly declared, "It is either me or Bülent," and left the decision to the party. In the vote held on 7 May 1972, the party council list proposed by Ecevit won with 709 votes. İsmet İnönü, who had led the CHP for 33 years, resigned as chairman on 8 May 1972. Ecevit was subsequently elected as the CHP's new chairman, receiving 828 votes out of 913 delegates, succeeding Atatürk and İnönü. İnönü attended the following ordinary congress the month after in June, resigned from his party and parliamentary seat in November, and was appointed Senator by president Fahri Korutürk, a position he served for a year until his death.

== Bülent Ecevit: (1972–1980) ==
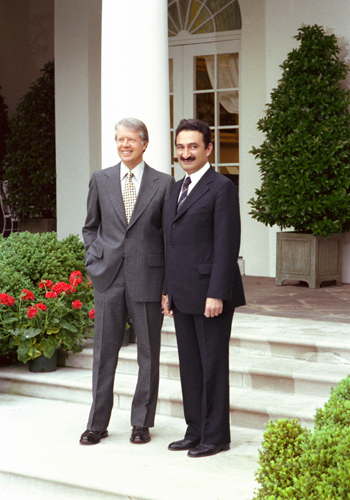
Ecevit and US President Jimmy Carter, 1978

As chairman of the CHP, Bülent Ecevit took on a distinct left wing role in politics, and although remaining staunchly nationalist, implemented socialism into the ideology of CHP. He defined Democratic Left ideology as a uniquely Turkish phenomenon, not derived to Marxism. In the Republican People's Party's 23rd Ordinary Congress held in 1976, six principles of the Democratic Left were added to the already existing Six Arrows. These principles were liberty, equality, solidarity, the supremacy of labor, the integrity of development, and self-governance of the people. The CHP joined the Socialist International. Over the course of the 1970s, Ecevit introduced major reforms to the party's institutions.

Ecevit initially believed Turkey's destiny was not with Europe. He extended this Eurosceptic sentiment to his economic policy, not only establishing generous social programs and enabling a larger government role in the economy, but also raising protective tariffs to keep cheap foreign goods out of Turkey. His combative stance against Athens prevented Turkey from joining the European Economic Community jointly with Greece in 1979.

Upon becoming chairman, Ecevit ultimately supported the military-backed Ferit Melen government, but withdrew ministers when they could not come to an agreement on governance. In the 1973 presidential election, Ecevit and Demirel cooperated against anti-democratic forces seeking to have General Faruk Gürler elected. On 6 April 1973, Fahri Korutürk was elected president.

Since the late 1960s, the Justice Party's political coalition fractured as particular right-wing currents splintered off. In Ecevit's first general election in 1973 the CHP won with 33% of the vote. He eventually chose to form a coalition with the National Salvation Party (MSP) of Necmettin Erbakan, an Islamist party. In the 1973 local elections the CHP came first place with 37% of the vote. The ban on opium cultivation that was previously implemented by the military governments under heavy American pressure was retracted, and the age to vote was lowered to 18.

On 15 July 1974, pro-Enosis forces in Cyprus overthrew the Makarios government and threatened the safety of Turkish Cypriots. Failed diplomatic negotiations resulted in Turkey militarily intervening in Cyprus. Following the invasion, the CHP-MSP government dissolved on 18 September due to disagreements within the government, especially over secularism. Ecevit hoped for an early election, but instead a new coalition government led by Demirel was formed by right-wing parties -the AP, MSP, CGP, and the Nationalist Movement Party (MHP)- called the First National Front Government. The government exasperated political tensions which evolved into intense political violence.

In 1977 the DİSK, a major leftist trade union confederation, endorsed the CHP in that year's early general election. On 26 April Ecevit survived an assassination attempt when his campaign bus was fired upon in Niksar. During DİSK's May Day rally held in Taksim Square shots were fired into the crowd from surrounding buildings; 37 people died as a result of the attack and the ensuing stampede in what was known as Bloody May Day. On 29 May Ecevit's entourage was fired at as he disembarked from his plane at İzmir-Çiğli Airport. On 2 June 1977, Demirel informed Ecevit that an assassination attempt against him was planned for the CHP's Taksim Square rally scheduled for 3 June; Ecevit chose to go through with the rally anyway, which was highly attended. The CHP won the 1977 elections with 41.3% of the vote, which is a record for the party. However the CHP did not capture a majority. Ecevit attempted governing with a minority government, but resigned when the government failed to secure a vote of confidence. Demirel was then tasked with forming a government and established the Second Nationalist Front Government on 21 July 1977, another right-wing coalition between the AP, MSP, and MHP. In that year's local elections held during a period of economic crisis, the CHP secured 41.7% of the vote and won the mayoralties of 41 provincial centers, another record.

On 22 December 1977, Bülent Ecevit submitted a motion of censure against the government; on 31 December, the Second Nationalist Front Government was toppled by a vote of no confidence—with 228 votes against and 218 in favor. He established a government in January 1978, with the support of the CGP, the Democratic Party, and independent MPs that defected from the AP in the Güneş Motel affair. Ecevit commented that they had "inherited a wreck".

As the political violence turned into a low-level civil war, the Confederation of Turkish Trade Unions proposed the formation of a grand CHP-AP coalition, but neither party was willing. By the end of the year 105 people had died in Maraş massacre. On 1 February Abdi İpekçi, the editor-in-chief of the Milliyet, was assassinated. The Turkish Industry and Business Association (TÜSİAD) began publishing newspaper advertisements calling for the resignation of the Ecevit government. When the CHP lost the 1979 Senate election and parliamentary by-elections Ecevit resigned on 16 October. Süleyman Demirel returned to the premiership and established a minority government on 12 November 1979. Ecevit convened an extraordinary party congress to seek a vote of confidence as party chairman, which he retained.

The back and forth between the CHP and AP, Ecevit and Demirel, in the backdrop of extreme polarization, brought the country to a standstill. On 19 July 1980 Nihat Erim, a former CHP Prime Minister, was assassinated. President Fahri Korutürk's term of office expired on 6 April 1980, but parliament failed to elect a new president. The CHP nominated retired general and CHP Senator Muhsin Batur for the presidency, but after 115 rounds of voting he was unable to become Head of State. In an atmosphere of intensifying political crisis 12 September 1980, the Turkish Armed Forces seized power in a coup d'état. Parliament, the government, and the constitution were dissolved. The activities of political parties, associations, and trade unions were suspended. Kenan Evren and the National Security Council began governing the country. Bülent Ecevit and Süleyman Demirel were placed under house arrest at the Hamzaköy facilities in Gelibolu, while Necmettin Erbakan and Alparslan Türkeş were sent to Uzunada. On 30 October 1980 Bülent Ecevit resigned from the CHP chairmanship. On 16 October 1981, the National Security Council dissolved the Republican People's Party, along with all other political parties.

== Recovery period: (1980–1992) ==
After the 1980 military coup, the name "Republican People's Party" and the abbreviation CHP were banned from use by the military regime. A new constitution was submitted by referendum and approved with 91.3% of the vote. Through the same vote, the National Security Council (MGK) and Head of State Kenan Evren were confirmed in their roles, with Evren becoming the President of Turkey. An period of repression followed, resulting in 650,000 arrests, and hundreds of deaths in prison, executions, and disappearances.

Until 1998, Turkey was ruled by the centre-right Motherland Party (ANAP) and the True Path Party (DYP), unofficial successors of the Democrat Party and the Justice Party, as well as, briefly, by Erbakan's Islamist party: the Welfare Party. CHP supporters also established successor parties: The Populist Party (HP) was founded by Necdet Calp to compete in the 1983 general election. In 1985, Erdal İnönü, İsmet İnönü's son, consolidated his Social Democracy Party (SODEP) with the HP to form the Social Democratic Populist Party (SHP), while the Democratic Left Party (Turkish: Demokratik Sol Parti, DSP) was formed by Rahşan Ecevit, Bülent Ecevit's wife (Bülent later took over the DSP in 1987).

After three years of junta rule, elections were announced to held on 6 November 1983. Only three parties were permitted to run: the Motherland Party (ANAP), founded by Turgut Özal; the Populist Party (HP), founded by Necdet Calp; and the Nationalist Democracy Party (MDP), founded by Turgut Sunalp. ANAP secured 45% of the vote and came to power with a single-party government. The Populist Party –the de facto successor to the CHP– received 30% of the vote and became the main opposition party. Erdal İnönü, chairman of the Social Democracy Party (SODEP), was barred from competing in the election, but called for the left-wing parties to unite. In 1985, the SODEP merged with HP into the Social Democratic Populist Party (SHP) under İnönü. The Democratic Left Party (DSP) –founded by Rahşan Ecevit– was invited to merge with the SHP, but the unification did not materialize.

On 6 September 1987, the ANAP government held a referendum to lift the political bans imposed by the military junta; which passed. A week later Bülent Ecevit assumed leadership of the DSP from Rahşan. In the 1989 local elections the SHP won the mayoralties of Istanbul, Ankara, İzmir, and 39 other provinces, and secured 29% of the vote in the provincial council elections.

In the 1991 general election, the DYP finished first, securing 27% of the vote. The SHP was the first political party to form an electoral alliance with a pro-Kurdish party: the People's Labour Party, but the SHP fell to third place with 20% of the vote. DYP Chairman Süleyman Demirel was tasked to form a government, forming a coalition with the SHP. Erdal İnönü assumed the role of Deputy Prime Minister. Secretary-General Deniz Baykal of the SHP, a household name from the 1970s CHP, resigned from his post after a series of attempts to overthrow Erdal İnönü in the 1990, 1991, and 1992 party congresses. Prior to the SHP's 7th Extraordinary Congress on 25–26 January 1992, Deniz Baykal and İsmail Cem co-authored a book titled New Left, in which they proposed a restructuring of the SHP. At the 7th Extraordinary Congress, İnönü defeated Baykal once again and was elected chairman.

== Deniz Baykal: (1992–2010) ==
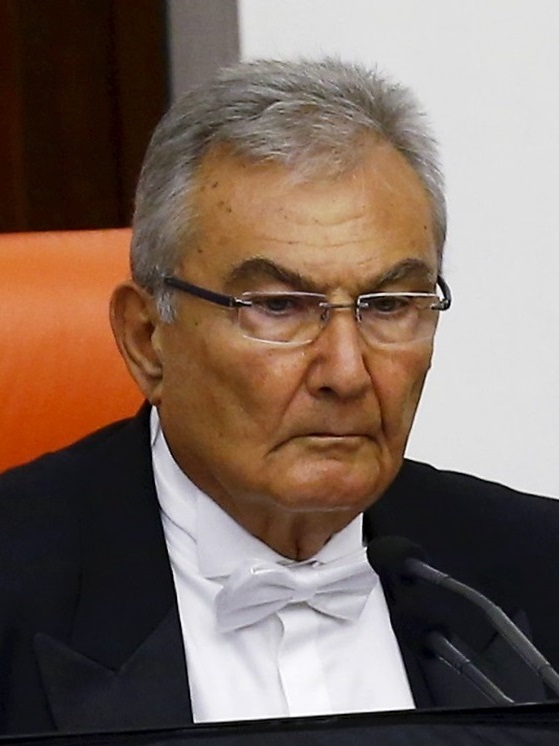
Deniz Baykal, 2015

Between 1991 and 1995, Turkey was ruled by the coalition of centre-right DYP and center-left SHP (later the reestablished CHP when they merged). The Islamists returned with a new party, the Welfare Party (Refah), while the reestablished Nationalist Movement Party (MHP) took advantage of the disillusionment felt by former supporters of the Welfare Party and the constant bickering of ANAP and DYP.

In 1992 the ban on pre-1980 parties was lifted the surviving members of the CHP's last General Executive Board issued a declaration which re-opened the Republican People's Party (CHP). The CHP resumed its activities, and in its 25th Ordinary Congress –attended by a majority of the delegates from the previous 8th Extraordinary Congress of 1979– Deniz Baykal won the chairmanship election against Erol Tuncer. Twenty-one MPs broke away from the SHP to join the reestablished party. Baykal is acknowledged to have steered the CHP to the center vis-a-vis the other main Kemalist party of the time, Ecevit's DSP. Commentators noted these parties split the Kemalist vote in key elections, due to the electoral threshold being 10% in general elections. In the 1994 Istanbul mayoralty election, Welfare candidate Recep Tayyip Erdoğan won with only 25% of the vote, because the SHP, CHP, and DSP split the vote amongst themselves despite their similar ideologies.

When President Turgut Özal unexpectedly passed away on 17 April 1993, Süleyman Demirel, DYP Chairman and Prime Minister, ran for the presidency and was elected as the ninth President of Turkey, with the support of its coalition partner, the SHP -the CHP had nominated İsmail Cem. With Demirel resigning the DYP chairmanship when he became president and İnönü announcing his retirement from politics in that year's party congress, the DYP and SHP simultaneously changed their leaders. Demirel was succeeded by Tansu Çiller as DYP Chairwoman, where as Murat Karayalçın assumed leadership of the SHP. On 25 June 1993, a new DYP-SHP government led by Prime Minister Tansu Çiller took office.

In February 1995, the SHP and CHP merged under the CHP's banner. It was decided that neither Baykal or Karayalçın would lead the party, but instead Hikmet Çetin. However Baykal made a come back in the subsequent 27th Ordinary Congress of the CHP held on 9 September 1995, returning to the chairmanship after Çetin's brief intermezzo. In June 1995, remarks made by Istanbul Police Chief Necdet Menzir regarding Algan Hacaloğlu –the CHP Minister of State for Human Rights– caused tension among the coalition partners and ultimately led to the collapse of the government.

After the minority government formed by Çiller failed to secure a vote of confidence in the parliament, the DYP and CHP formed a care-taker government to lead the country to elections. Deniz Baykal served as Deputy Prime Minister and Minister of Foreign Affairs. In the 1995 general election the CHP secured only 49 parliamentary seats with 11% of the vote. Meanwhile, Ecevit's DSP received 15% of the vote.

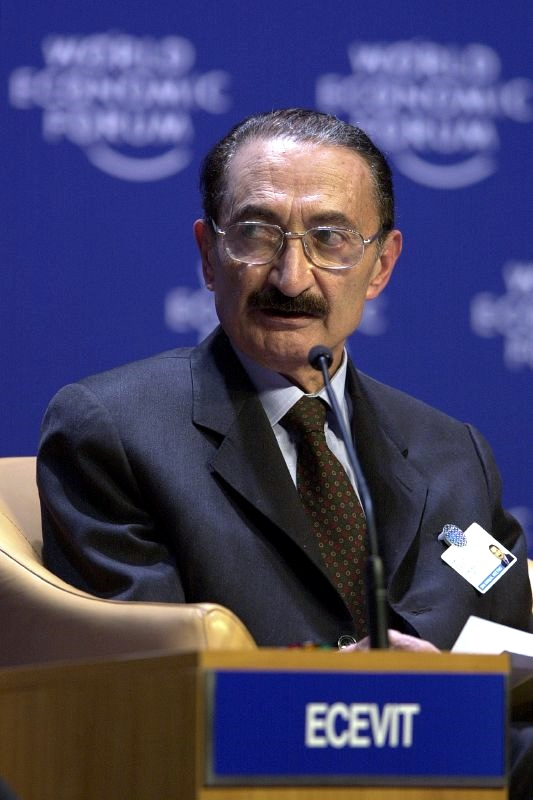
Prime Minister Bülent Ecevit, 2000, then leader of the Democratic Left Party (DSP)

In 1997, after the resignation of the Refah-DYP coalition following the 28 February "post-modern coup", the ANAP formed a government with the DSP and the small centre-right party Democratic Turkey Party (DTP), along with the support of CHP. In November 1998, when Prime Minister Mesut Yılmaz had to deal with the Türkbank scandal, the CHP submitted a motion of censure against the government, leading to the coalition's collapse.

Just before the elections of 1999, the DSP formed a minority government with the support of the DYP and ANAP. Notably, PKK leader Abdullah Öcalan was captured in Kenya during Ecevit's premiership. Therefore, in the elections of 1999, the CHP failed to pass the 10% threshold (8.7% vote), winning no seats in parliament. Baykal took responsibility for the election defeat and resigned, Altan Öymen became the new leader in a subsequent party congress. After a year of inter-party chaos, Baykal returned to the chairmanship in the 11th Extraordinary Congress of 2000 with Önder Sav was elected General Secretary.

Bülent Ecevit went on to form a coalition government between the DSP, MHP and ANAP, returning to the premiership after 21 years. His government introduced much needed economic reform following the 2001 currency crisis, and began Turkey's assetion into the European Union. However scandles, the not-yet-recovered economy, and Ecevit's age and poor health lead to the government's collapse in 2002. Ecevit's loss of control over his party lead to the foundation of another Kemalist-social democrat party: the New Turkey Party led by İsmail Cem, which would merge with the CHP in 2004. Most Kemalists voted for the CHP while the DSP collapsed. In the 2002 parliamentary elections, the CHP won 20% of the vote and 30% of the seats in parliament, and only it and the new AKP (Justice and Development Party) entered parliament. None of the previously existing parties were able to pass the 10% national threshold.

=== Baykal's opposition to the AKP ===
The CHP became the main opposition party and Turkey's second largest party. It had begun the long road to recovery. However, this had little to do with voters supporting CHP. Many were former DSP supporters who were angry at the economic crisis and blamed the Ecevit government. Since the dramatic 2002 general election, the CHP has been racked by internal power struggles, and has been outclassed by the AKP governments of Recep Tayyip Erdoğan, which drew support from former DYP, ANAP, and Welfare Party voters. Many on the left were critical of the leadership of CHP, especially Deniz Baykal, who they complained was stifling the party of young blood by turning away the young who turned either to apathy or even vote for the AKP. While the AKP boasted a young leadership, the CHP were seen as an 'old guard' party of the state that did not represent modern Turkey. Leftists were critical of the party's continuous opposition to the removal of Article 301 of the Turkish penal code; which caused people to be prosecuted for "insulting Turkishness" including Nobel Prize-winning author Orhan Pamuk, Elif Şafak, and the conviction of Turkish-Armenian journalist Hrant Dink, its attitude towards the minorities in Turkey, as well as its Cyprus policy.

Though the AKP won the election, its chairman Recep Tayyip Erdoğan, was subject to a political ban, thus Abdullah Gül initially formed the government. The CHP supported a constitutional amendment passed in parliament to lift Erdoğan's political ban. In December, the Supreme Election Council annulled the general election in Siirt due to corruption allegations. By-elections held there on 9 March 2003 lead to the AKP winning all three parliamentary seats, including Erdoğan who assumed the office of Prime Minister on 15 March.

In the lead up to the US-lead coalition invasion of Iraq, AKP leadership failed to come to a consensus whether to participate. By a thin margin, parliament vetoed invading Iraq, due to half of the AKP's parliamentary group voting with the CHP against war. CHP leadership briefly held a soft Euroscepticism as the AKP government came close to an ascension plan with the European Union. In the local elections of 2004, the CHP's overall share of the vote held, largely through mopping up anti-Erdoğan votes among former supporters of smaller left-wing and secular right-wing parties, but was badly beaten by the AKP across the country, losing former strongholds such as Antalya.

During this time, Baykal dealt with a leadership challenge from Mustafa Sarıgül, who was holding rallys to take over the party chairmanship. Baykal convened the CHP's 12th Extraordinary Congress on 3 July 2004, where he retained his position after receiving a vote of confidence. Sarıgül, however, continued his opposition and held further rallies. Sarıgül was referred to the disciplinary board, though his expulsion rejected by a vote of 8 to 7. Deniz Baykal announced another Extraordinary Congress, which was marked by heated arguments and fist fights. Baykal was again re-elected chairman. Following the congress Sarıgül was expelled from the CHP.

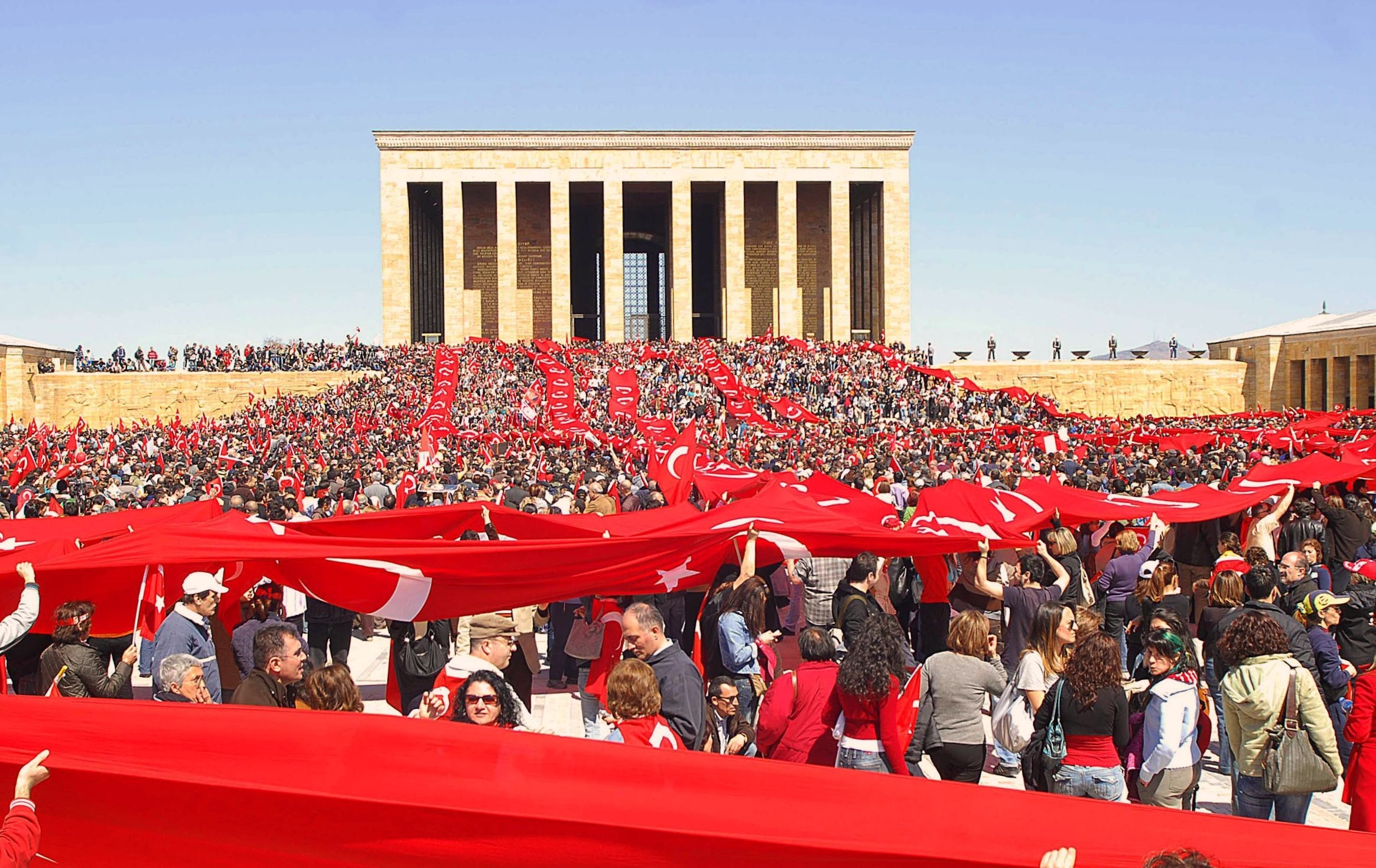
Republic Protest in Anıtkabir, Atatürk's mausoleum

In 2007, the culmination of tensions between Turkey's secularist establishment and the AKP turned into a political crisis. The CHP assisted undemocratic attempts by the army and judiciary to shut down the newly elected AKP. The crisis began with massive protests by secularists supported by the CHP in reaction to the AKP's candidate for that year's presidential election: Abdullah Gül, due to his background in Islamist politics and his wife's wearing of the hijab. The CHP's campaign focused on the alleged Islamism that the AKP victory would bring into government, though this attack alienated liberals and democrats from the party. The CHP chose to boycott the (indirect) election. Without quorum, Erdoğan called for a snap election to increase his mandate, in which the CHP formed an electoral alliance with the declining DSP, but gained only 21% of the vote and 112 MPs (13 being DSP), where as the AKP won the election with 47%. The party finished first only in the three Thracian provinces of Edirne, Tekirdağ, Kırklareli, as well as two provinces on the Aegean coast, which were İzmir and Muğla. During the campaign season, a memorandum directed at the AKP was posted online by the Turkish Armed Forces. The CHP boycotted Gül's second attempt to be voted president, though this time Gül had the necessary quorum with the MHP's participation and won. The swearing-in ceremony was boycotted by the CHP and the Chief of the General Staff Yaşar Büyükanıt.

The party also voted against a package of constitutional amendments to have the president elected by the people instead of parliament, which was eventually put to a referendum. The "no" campaign, supported by the CHP, failed, as a majority of Turks voted in favor of direct presidential elections. The final challenge against the AKP's existence was a 2008 closure trial which ended without a ban. Following the decision, the AKP government, in a covert alliance with the Gülen movement, began a purge of the Turkish military, judiciary, and police forces of secularists in the Ergenekon and Sledgehammer trials, which the CHP condemned.

In January 2008, Prime Minister Erdoğan proposed lifting the ban on headscarves in universities; while the MHP supported the proposal, the CHP vehemently opposed it. When the constitutional amendment passed through parliament in early February, the CHP appealed to the Constitutional Court. The Constitutional Court upheld the CHP's petition and blocked the lifting of the headscarf ban.

The CHP received 23% of the vote in the 2009 local elections. The party gained considerable ground by winning over Antalya, Giresun, Zonguldak, Sinop, Tekirdağ, and Aydın, despite losing Trabzon municipality. In 20 provinces of Turkey, the party received less than 3% of the votes. Kemal Kılıçdaroğlu gained prominence for his close loss in the Istanbul mayoralty race. During the election, the party tried to attract conservative and devout Muslims to the party by allowing women who wear the hijab to become party members including promises to introduce Quran courses if requested in every district. However, the allowing of women wearing hijab into the party received a severe blow when a normally non-headscarved member of CHP (Kıymet Özgür) performed a stunt by wearing a black hijab and attempted to enter an election bus in Istanbul. The incident raised questions about sincerity of the CHP's support of religious freedoms.

On 10 May 2010, Deniz Baykal announced his resignation as leader of the CHP after a video was leaked of him sitting on a bed with Nesrin Baytok who was his private secretary and a MP.

== First chairmanship of Kemal Kılıçdaroğlu: (2010–2023) ==
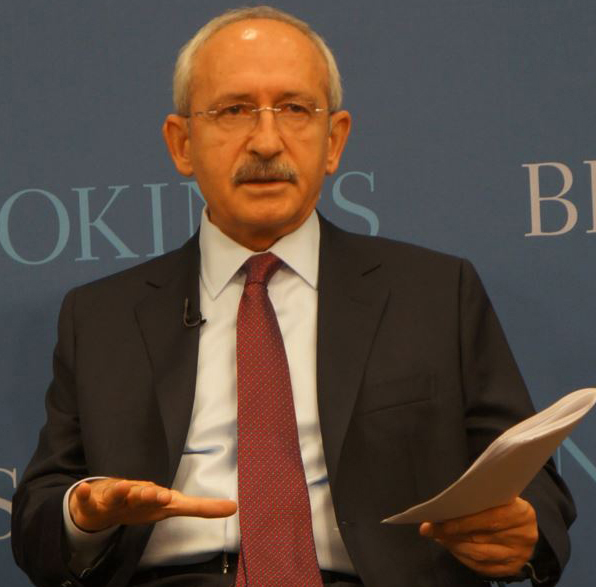
Kemal Kılıçdaroğlu, 2015

On 22 May 2010 Kemal Kılıçdaroğlu was elected to be the new party leader in a party convention, who was Baykal's preferred candidate to succeed him. Coming to the chairmanship with the support of dissatisfied members of the party's social democratic left-wing, he set about to reform the party and return it to its traditional center-left stance. He more over worked to cast away its secularist-establishmentalist image. This involved building bridges to voters it has traditionally not attracted: the devout, Kurds, and right-wing voters. He announced a new slate in the party's Central Executive Board which excluded Baykal's supports, notably Önder Sav, and introduced primaries to elect the party's MP candidates. Under Kılıçdaroğlu the CHP would lose five general elections (receiving between 22 and 26% of the vote), three presidential elections, and two constitutional referendums.

The CHP supported the No campaign in the 2010 constitutional referendum, which was held months after the leadership change in the party. The constitutional package ended up winning in the ballot box.

In the 2011 general election the CHP increased their vote share to 26%, but remained the main opposition to the AKP which received 47% of the vote. The party changed its bylaws to include a 33% quota for women and a 10% quota for youth. The next year Kılıçdaroğlu faced an internal rebellion by the old guard his own party, reportedly supported by Baykal. However, the attempt failed and at the party congress held in 2012, Kılıçdaroğlu remained the CHP leader. Members of the party strongly supported the 2013 Gezi Park protests.

In the 2014 local elections, the CHP received 26% of the vote.

In the 2014 presidential election the CHP fielded a joint candidate with the MHP: Ekmeleddin İhsanoğlu, former Secretary-General of the Organisation of Islamic Cooperation. The AKP's candidate, Erdoğan, won the election with 52% of the vote in the first round. İhsanoğlu was defeated and took only 38% of the vote. Kılıçdaroğlu faced a leadership rebellion for the defeat, this time from Muharrem İnce, who lost in the 18th Extraordinary Convention to Kılıçdaroğlu: 740 to 415 votes.

In the June 2015 election the CHP received 25% of the vote, but considered it a victory because many CHP members strategically voted for the pro-Kurdish People's Democratic Party (HDP) so it could cross the electoral threshold and win representation in parliament. This resulted in a hung parliament, because the AKP lost its parliamentary majority. During coalition negotiations, Kılıçdaroğlu called for MHP Chairman Devlet Bahçeli to form a government and offered him the position of Prime Minister, however Bahçeli rejected the offer. Further talks between the AKP and CHP for a grand-coalition fell through. A subsequent snap election in November returned the AKP's majority government, and CHP again received 25%.

Following the 2016 coup d'état attempt, the CHP opposed the state of emergency, though it supported the government's subsequent purges and incursions into Syria. This support went so far as to help the government pass a law to lift parliamentary immunities, resulting in the jailing of MPs from the HDP, including Selahattin Demirtaş, as well as CHP lawmakers. Kılıçdaroğlu attended several cross-party rallies in anti-coup demonstrations. The AKP submitted constitutional amendments to transform Turkey from a Parliamentary system to a Presidential system. The CHP opposed the amendments, without parliamentary support they went to a referendum, the "No" campaign of which was supported by the CHP. The constitutional reforms ultimately prevailed, to criticism of electoral fraud unenforced by the Supreme Election Council.

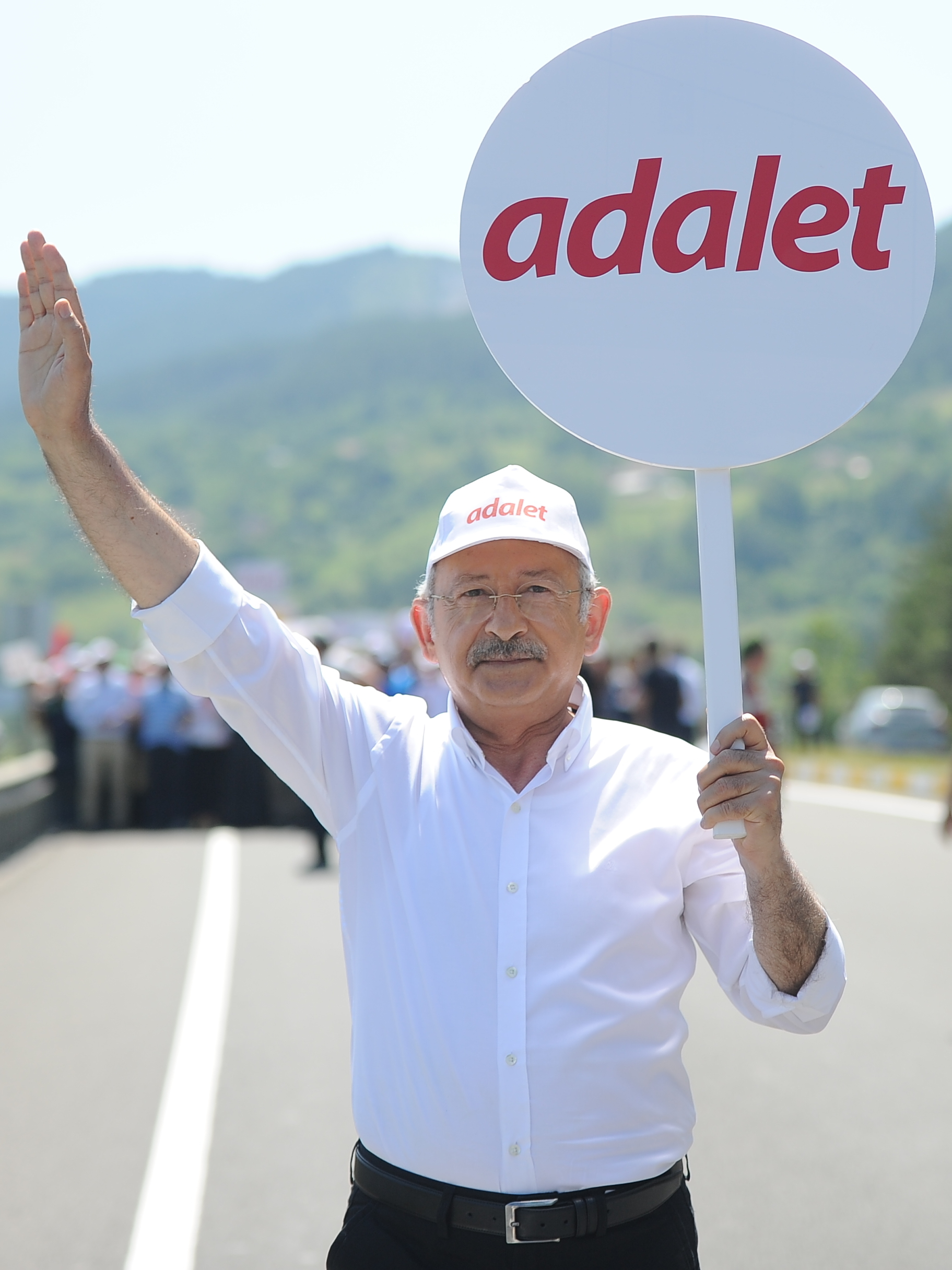
Kemal Kılıçdaroğlu during the 2017 March for Justice

Between 15 June and 9 July 2017, Kemal Kılıçdaroğlu embarked on a March for Justice from Ankara to Istanbul. Kılıçdaroğlu decided to undertake the march on 14 June 2017, following the sentencing of CHP Istanbul MP Enis Berberoğlu to twenty-five years in prison for leaking footage of MİT trucks transporting supplied to rebel groups in Syria to Can Dündar, the former editor-in-chief of the Cumhuriyet newspaper. Other greviances cited in the march included the prolonged application of decrees issued after the 2016 coup attempt which shifted from purging Gülenists to all opposition groups; the arrest of members of parliament; and the dismissal of university professors. In 2017 MHP chairman Devlet Bahçeli faced a rebellion in his party for his cooperation with Erdoğan and the AKP. Anti-Erdoğanist MHP members -led by Meral Akşener- went on to found the Good Party. Kılıçdaroğlu was instrumental in the facilitating the rise of the new party by transferring CHP MPs so they would have a parliamentary group to compete in the upcoming 2018 election.

At the CHP's 36th Ordinary Congress held in Ankara on 3–4 February 2018, Kemal Kılıçdaroğlu was re-elected chairman, securing 790 of the 1,237 valid votes cast; Muharrem İnce received 447 votes. Kılıçdaroğlu lost support in the Party Assembly elections.

In the 2018 general election, the CHP, Good Party, Felicity Party, and Democrat Party established the Nation Alliance, against the People's Alliance of the AKP and MHP. However they nominated separate candidates for the presidential election. Muharrem İnce was announced as the CHP's presidential candidate, who was the main challenger to the incumbent People's Alliance candidate: Erdoğan. He won the first round of the election with 53% of the vote in the first round, İnce received only 31% of the vote. The CHP's vote was reduced to 23% due to strategic voting for other parties, the alliance received 34% of the vote. The party headquarters rejected calls to hold an extraordinary congress.

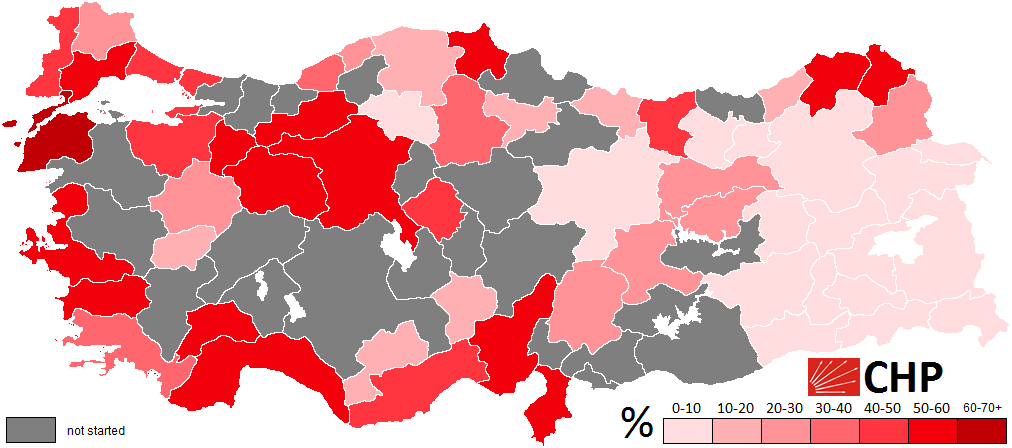
Party's performance in the 2019 Turkish local elections by province.

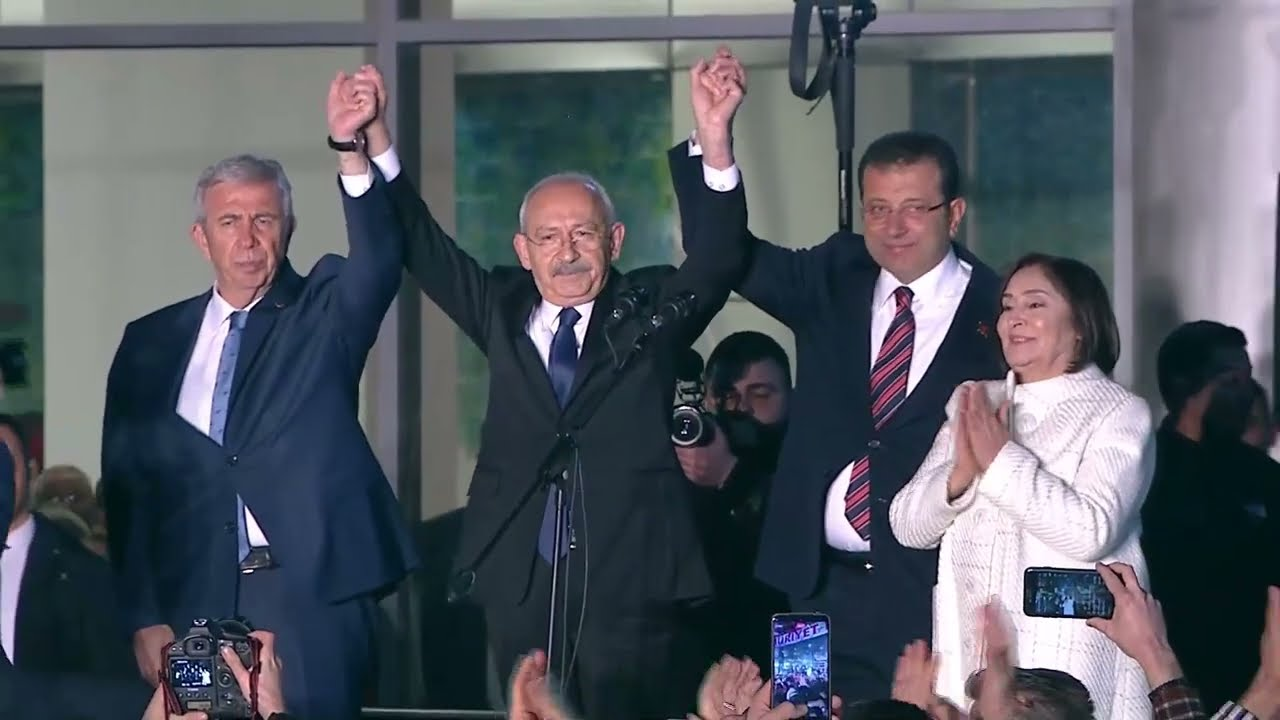
Kılıçdaroğlu between Ankara Mayor Mansur Yavaş and İstanbul Mayor Ekrem İmamoğlu

The Nation Alliance was reestablished for the 2019 local elections. The CHP and the Good Party negotiated to compete for the mayoralties of different provinces while also forming a tacit cooperation with the HDP. The election resulted in great gains for the CHP, winning almost 30% of the vote and the municipal mayoralties of Istanbul and Ankara, in addition to the mayoralties of Antalya, Adana, Mersin, Bilecik, Bolu, Kırşehir, Artvin, and Ardahan. The CHP's candidate for the Istanbul mayoralty was Ekrem İmamoğlu, who won by less than 14,000 votes. However, in a controversial decision from the Supreme Election Council, the mayoral election was annulled. In the re-run election held on 23 June 2019, İmamoğlu further increased his vote share, winning with 54% of the vote. İmamoğlu ended the tradition of the Istanbul Metropolitan Municipality being governed by mayors aligned with Islamist politics since 1994. İmamoğlu and Ankara's CHP mayor Mansur Yavaş have since been speculated as prospective CHP candidates for president since their elections due to their charisma and perceived electability. Kılıçdaroğlu was reelected in chairman in the party's 37th Ordinary Convention as the sole candidate.

As a high-profile CHP official and prospective presidential candidate, İmamoğlu received praise for his mayorship in Istanbul implementing a social municipalist program, offering public services including municipal grocery stores and kindergartens. Priorities ignored by previous mayors were also paid attention to: including creating green spaces, finishing public transportation projects, cultural initiatives, and enforcing earthquake safety codes.

Despite being party leader, Kemal Kılıçdaroğlu did not run as CHP's presidential candidate in 2014 or 2018. He was finally nominated as the CHP and Nation Alliance candidate for the 2023 presidential election. Re-established for the parliamentary election, it included the CHP, Good Party, Felicity Party, Democrat Party, and two new members: the Future Party of Ahmet Davutoğlu, and DEVA Party of Ali Babacan, previously high-profile AKP politicians. Kılıçdaroğlu's candidacy was controversial due to his perceived lack of electability for having lost so many elections as chairman, and because Ekrem İmamoğlu and Mansur Yavaş, the mayors of İstanbul and Ankara respectively, would have been more electable. After Good Party chairwoman Akşener publicly called for Kılıçdaroğlu's campaign to end in favor of either of the two mayors, Kılıçdaroğlu compromised his candidacy by inviting them and other party leaders in Nation Alliance to be his vice-presidents: İmamoğlu, Yavaş, Akşener, Temel Karamollaoğlu, Gültekin Uysal, Davutoğlu, and Babacan. Kılıçdaroğlu's candidacy was also endorced by the Kurdish Party. Despite the AKP government's lackluster response to the economic crisis, COVID-19 pandemic, and the Kahramanmaraş earthquake, Kılıçdaroğlu lost his presidential bid to Erdoğan after taking the race to a run-off and receiving 48% of the vote. The Nation Alliance again lost the parliamentary election to the ruling People's Alliance. The smaller Nation Alliance parties to the CHP's right ran on its lists, which resulted in them receiving 35 seats in parliament for minimal electoral gains (25%). At the 38th Ordinary Party Congress held shortly after the election, Özgür Özel was elected leader of the CHP, narrowly defeating the incumbent Kılıçdaroğlu who had held the position since 2010.

== Özgür Özel: (2023–2026) ==
Electoral map of the 2024 Turkish local elections

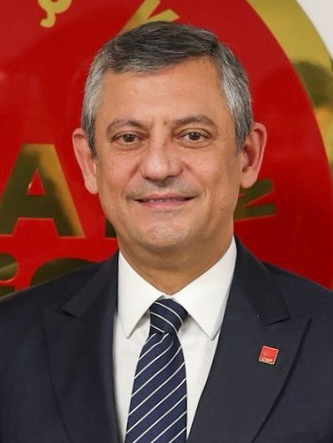
Özgür Özel in 2026

Özgür Özel hailed from the party's social democratic faction as an ally of İmamoğlu.

In the 2024 local election, the CHP emerged as the largest party in the country, defeating the AKP for the first time. It retained all the metropolitan municipalities it previously held -with the exception of Hatay and Kırklareli- and additionally won the metropolitan municipalities of Bursa, Balıkesir, Denizli, Manisa, and numerous provincial municipalities across the interior of Anatolia.

On 19 March 2025, the CHP mayor of Istanbul, Ekrem İmamoğlu, was arrested by the government on suspicion of corruption, extortion, bribery, money laundering, espionage, and supporting terrorism, an action most human rights organizations have declared politically motivated. The CHP was to hold a presidential primary election on 23 March, which İmamoğlu was going to run uncontested for. He won his primary while under arrest, with more than 18 million in support. The day before, Istanbul University annulled İmamoğlu's university degree, citing irregularities. As Turkey's presidential candidates must hold a university degree, this would effectively block him from running for president. His arrest sparked nationwide protests and international criticism. In the months that followed, more than 30 CHP mayors were detained or arrested as part of various investigations.

== Second chairmanship of Kemal Kılıçdaroğlu: (2026–) ==
=== Absolute nullity crisis and the New Party ===
In a controversial decision from the Regional Court of Appeal in Ankara, the 38th CHP Ordinary Congress was annulled returning Kılıçdaroğlu to the CHP chairmanship. Kılıçdaroğlu's attacks on Özel and İmamoğlu, the party's imprisoned presidential candidate, along with expulsion decisions issued by the party headquarters, sparked massive backlash among the party's grassroots, mayors, and parliamentary group. Özgür Özel and his supporters initially disputed the ruling, accusing Kılıçdaroğlu's return as a "political trusteeship" and "[government] interference in a party organization". Kılıçdaroğlu requested law enforcement to evict Özel's leadership from CHP's party headquarters in a highly publicized police raid. After Kılıçdaroğlu's party administration rejected calls for an extraordinary congress, on 24 July 2026, 91 MPs—led by Özgür Özel—resigned en masse from the CHP and founded the New Party. The CHP subsequently lost its status as the main opposition party, and fell to fifth place in terms of the number of seats held in parliament.

== See also ==
- Inspectorates-general
- New Party
- Turkish Hearths
