= Önder Sav =

Turkish politician

Grand National Assembly of Turkey 15th, 16th, 20th, 22nd and 23rd Period Balıkesir Deputy
- In office October 24, 1973 – April 23, 2011

Personal details
- Born: November 14, 1937 (age 88) Manyas, Balıkesir, Turkey
- Party: Republican People's Party (1956-2026); New Party (2026-present)
- Occupation: Politician

Önder Sav (born 14 November 1937 in Manyas, Balıkesir) is a Turkish lawyer and politician. He is of Circassian origin. He graduated from Ankara University Law School. He has been in politics since the 1950s. He is currently a member of New Party and was a member of the Turkish Parliament. In March 2003, he was against Turkish collaboration at the Iraq War, and he called American ships as "enemy ships".

He was president of the Turkish Bar Association from 1989 to 1995.
