= Republican People's Party absolute nullity crisis =

Turkish absolute nullity crisis

2026 absolute nullity crisis
- Date: 21 May 2026 – present
- Location: Turkey
- Cause: The ruling by the 36th Civil Chamber of the Ankara Regional Appellate Court.
- Participants: Republican People's Party, Turkish judiciary, Turkish government
- Outcome: The appointment of Kemal Kılıçdaroğlu as the leader of the Republican People's Party, along with the creation of the new main opposition New Party, resulted in the Republican People's Party losing its status as the Leader of the Opposition.

On 21 May 2026, an ongoing political dispute in Turkey, domestically known as the absolute nullity crisis (Turkish: mutlak butlan krizi), began when the Regional Court of Appeal in Ankara invalidated the 38th Ordinary and 21st Extraordinary Conventions of the Republican People's Party (CHP). The ruling removed CHP leader Özgür Özel and reinstated former leader Kemal Kılıçdaroğlu as chairman. The ruling also applied to all congresses and decisions made by the party after the 38th Ordinary Convention, including the CHP's provincial congress in Istanbul on 8 October 2023. The court stated that the decision was based on allegations of irregularities and corruption during the leadership election process. On 24 July, Özel and 90 other MPs split from the CHP and formed the New Party.

== Background ==
Under the leadership of Özgür Özel, the CHP became the largest party in the 2024 Turkish local elections, marking its first nationwide electoral victory in 47 years.

Under the leadership of Özgür Özel, the Republican People's Party (CHP) won the 2024 Turkish local elections with 37.81% of the vote, becoming the largest party in a nationwide election for the first time since the 1977 Turkish local elections. In Istanbul, Ekrem İmamoğlu was re-elected with 51.2% of the vote, while in Ankara, Mansur Yavaş secured re-election with 60.5%. The CHP won mayoralties in 14 metropolitan municipalities and 21 provincial capitals.

Following the elections, judicial and political pressure on the CHP intensified. The Turkish government expanded its policy of appointing Government Trustee, previously applied primarily to municipalities in southeastern Turkey, to CHP-controlled municipalities in western Turkey under investigations related to the Urban Consensus initiative. In October 2024, Ahmet Özer, the mayor of Esenyurt, was arrested on charges of membership in a terrorist organization, becoming the first CHP mayor to be removed from office under the new wave of investigations.

In March 2025, Ekrem İmamoğlu, who had been selected as the CHP's presidential candidate in the 2025 Republican People's Party presidential primary for the next presidential election, was arrested on corruption charges and transferred to Marmara Prison. His arrest sparked nationwide protests and international criticism. In the months that followed, more than 30 CHP mayors were detained or arrested as part of various investigations.

== Allegations of irregularities and legal challenges to the party congress ==
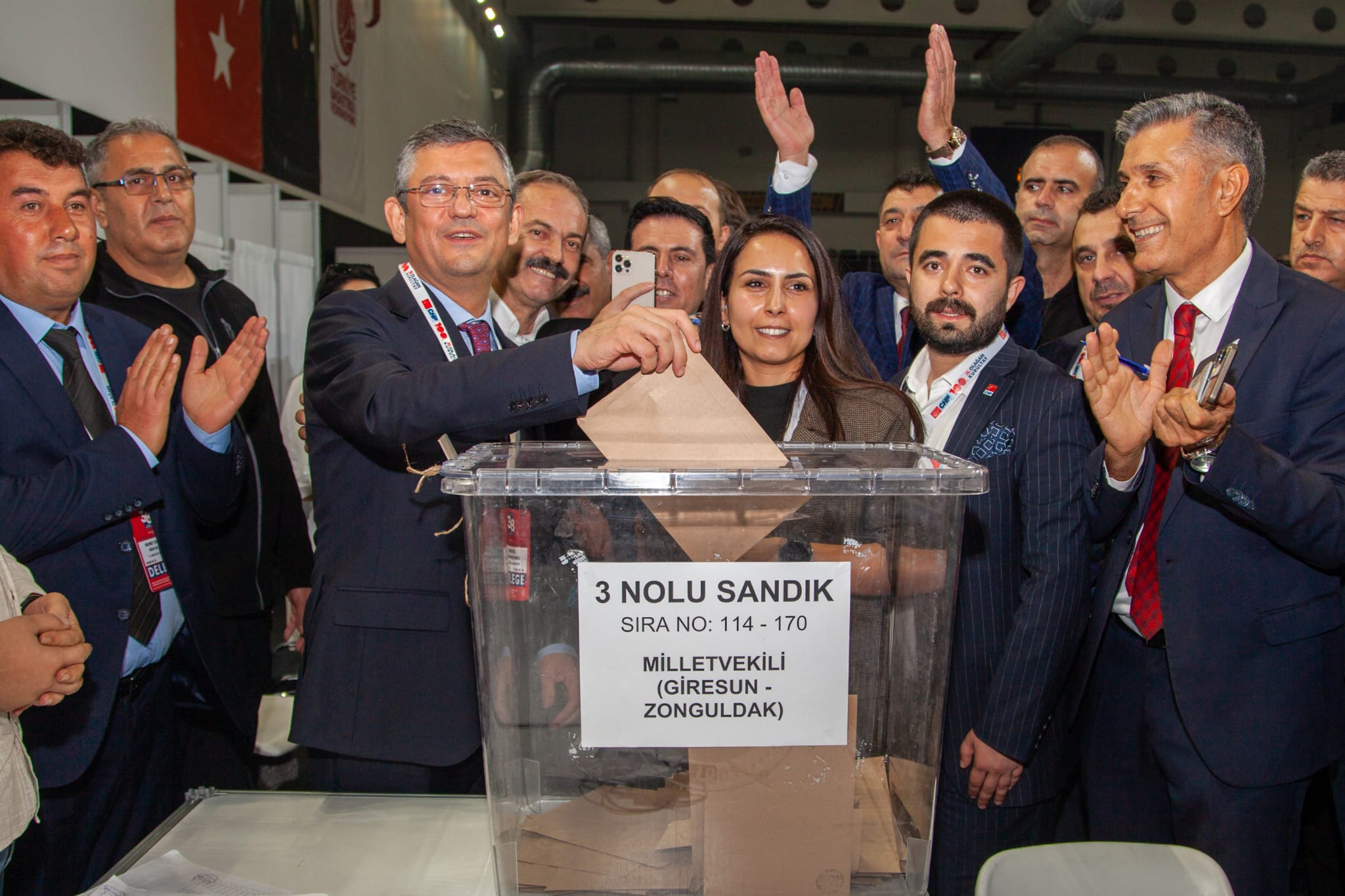
Özgür Özel casting his vote during the 38th Republican People's Party Ordinary Convention

Following the 38th Republican People's Party Ordinary Convention, allegations emerged that delegates' votes had been influenced through bribery, promises of public employment, candidacies, and other benefits. Former Hatay (electoral district) mayor Lütfü Savaş and several other party members filed lawsuits seeking the annulment of the congress, arguing that the election had violated the principles of internal party democracy, equality, and the free will of delegates.

A court of first instance dismissed the lawsuits, ruling that they had become moot because the CHP had subsequently held the 39th Republican People's Party Ordinary Convention and the 20th Republican People's Party Ordinary Convention. The plaintiffs appealed the ruling to the Ankara Regional Court of Appeal.

During the appellate proceedings, the court reviewed delegate testimonies, technical evidence, and materials gathered in criminal investigations conducted by the Ankara and Istanbul Chief Public Prosecutors' Offices. The court found sufficient indications that delegates' free will may have been compromised through pressure or the provision of benefits. Concluding that the alleged irregularities could constitute an issue of public order rather than merely an internal party dispute, the court proceeded to examine the case on its merits.

== Reactions and aftermath ==
Özel and his supporters described the court's decision as a judicial coup, as it was the first time in Turkish history that a party leadership elected by delegates had been overturned by a court ruling. Meanwhile, the Mayor of Ankara, Mansur Yavaş, argued the aim of the decision was to "divide Turkey's biggest opposition party and render it ineffective." Analysts have argued that this decision could cripple the CHP against the AK Party and trigger a snap election as early as autumn.

On 24 May, the Turkish police entered the CHP's main offices while firing tear gas and rubber bullets to evict the ousted leadership from the area.

The decision triggered an economic shock on the Turkish stock market, which fell 6% on Thursday, 21 May. In response to economic shocks, state banks sold $6–8 billion in an attempt to defend the lira. Meanwhile, the country's risk premium increased from 247 to 257 basis points.

Following the ruling, Turkish president Recep Tayyip Erdoğan also ordered the closure of the Istanbul Bilgi University. A few days later, he reversed that decision through another decree.

A poll by MetroPOLL showed that 62% of Turks did not approve the installation of Kemal Kılıçdaroğlu.

Özgür Özel announced in July 2026 he would be leaving the CHP to form a new political party, and it was reported that around 100 CHP MPs would join him.

== New Party ==
On July 24, Özgür Özel officially amended the new political party called New Party (YEP), along with 91 members of Parliament from the CHP moving to the newly-established party. After the transfer, the New Party became the main opposition, and the first party to achieve that status without entering any election.

== International reactions ==
=== Supranational organisations ===
- European Union: The European Union raised concerns over the rule of law, judicial independence and democratic pluralism in Turkey, an EU membership candidate, stating that opposition parties must be able to operate freely without fear of repression. A statement read: "This event and past events raise questions about the rule of law, fundamental rights, democratic pluralism and judicial independence. The Turkish people deserve to benefit from a vibrant and competitive democracy in which the people's voice is heard."
- European Union: Nacho Sánchez Amor, the European Parliament's rapporteur on Turkey, wrote on X that the ruling was "a well-prepared plan to eliminate the main opposition party" and described the situation as "a blueprint of a fully authoritarian system," calling on the EU to act. "With the decision of 'absolute nullity' on the congress of CHP, Atatürk's party, we enter into a dark era in Türkiye," Amor wrote.
- Socialist International: The Socialist International said in a statement that it was "extremely worried" by the judicial decision regarding the CHP leadership. It described the annulment of Özel's election as "a clear and unlawful act," adding that the attempt to replace him "is a blow to Turkey's democratic system and is truly unacceptable," and expressed full solidarity with Özel and the CHP's elected leadership. On 27 May, following an extraordinary meeting of its Ethics Committee, the Socialist International issued a further statement backing Özel, saying it had monitored the 2023 congress that elected him and found the procedures "democratic and inclusive," and calling the nullity ruling "unfounded."
- Party of European Socialists: The PES described the ruling as an "operation to silence the opposition" and called on Kaja Kallas, the EU's High Representative for Foreign Affairs, to act in defence of democracy in Turkey. The PES expressed solidarity with Özel and said the ruling was "contrary to the highest democratic standards."
- Human Rights Watch: HRW described the ruling as "the latest deeply damaging blow to the rule of law, democracy, and human rights in Türkiye." Benjamin Ward, the group's deputy Europe and Central Asia director, stated that the act was part of the Erdoğan administration's "broader political efforts to sideline the main political opposition in ways that profoundly undermine civil and political rights and Türkiye’s democratic process."

=== States ===
- Germany: Johann Wadephul, Germany's foreign minister, criticized the ruling on the sidelines of a NATO foreign ministers' meeting in Helsingborg, Sweden, saying it conflicted with Turkey's stated goal of EU membership. Wadephul said he was concerned by the annulment of an entire party congress and the removal of an opposition leader, and that political competition in democracies should be conducted through politics rather than the courts.
- Israel: The Israeli Foreign Ministry posted on X on 25 May 2026, after riot police stormed the CHP headquarters: "The free world and the self-appointed guardians of democracy and human rights remain silent as Erdoğan's regime crushes Turkish democracy in broad daylight. Opposition parties raided. Critics silenced. So much for defending democratic values."

== See also ==
- Interventions of political parties in Venezuela
