= Gökçe Gökçen =

Turkish politician (born 1991)

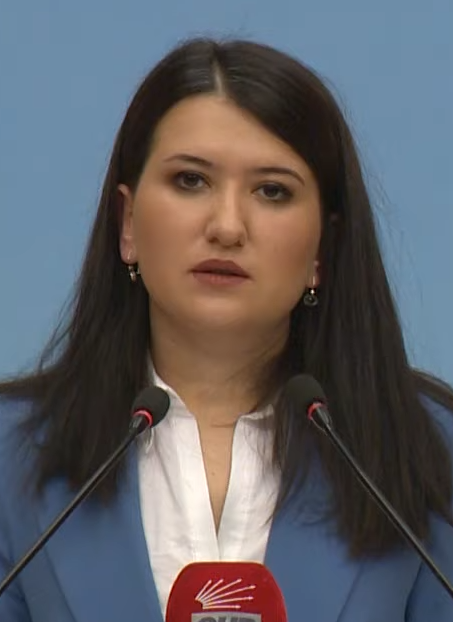
- Gökçen in 2022

Member of the Grand National Assembly
- Incumbent
- Assumed office 2 June 2023
- Constituency: İzmir (II) (2023)

Personal details
- Born: 24 September 1991 (age 35) Bakırköy, Istanbul, Turkey
- Party: Republican People's Party (2010–present)
- Spouse: Özgün Göl (m. 2024)

Gökçe Gökçen (born 24 September 1991) is a Turkish lawyer and politician who has served as a member of the Grand National Assembly for Izmir since 2023, representing the Republican People's Party (CHP). She has held senior positions within the CHP since 2018, serving as deputy chairwoman for youth policy from 2020 to 2023, and since 2023, as deputy chairwoman for legal policy.

== Early life and education ==
Gökçen was born on 24 September in the Bakırköy district of Istanbul. She completed her secondary education at Galatasaray High School and graduated from the law faculty of Galatasaray University in 2014. She went on to pursue a master's degree in human rights law at Istanbul Bilgi University, writing her thesis on the state of emergency in France; during that research she was visiting scholar at the University of Montpellier. She began an academic career as a research assistant in the constitutional law department of Marmara University's law faculty. She is fluent in English and French.

== Political career ==
Gökçen joined the CHP in 2010 during the campaign for that year's constitutional referendum and served as deputy chair of the party's Bakırköy youth branch from 2010 to 2014. She was elected to the CHP Party Assembly at the party's 37th ordinary congress in 2018, and on 10 August, 2020 was appointed deputy chairwoman responsible for youth policy, a post she held until her resignation on 1 June 2023 ahead of her election to parliament.

At the CHP's 38th ordinary congress in 2023, and again at the 21st and 22nd extraordinary congresses and the 39th ordinary in 2025, she was reelected to the Party Assembly and appointed deputy chairwoman responsible for legal policy.

In the 2023 Turkish general election, Gökçen was elected the Grand National Assembly representing Izmir's second electoral district. In parliament she sits on Constitution Commission and the joint committee of the Constitution and Justice Commissions, and represents Turkey in the Parliament Assembly of the council of Europe. In 2024 she was named one of ten CHP deputies appointed appointed to parliament's proposed Terror free Turkey Commission, a cross party body examining the resolution of the Kurdish conflict.

== Personal life ==
Gökçen married Özgün Göl in 2024.
