= 38th Republican People's Party Ordinary Convention =

Political party elections

- 4 November 2023
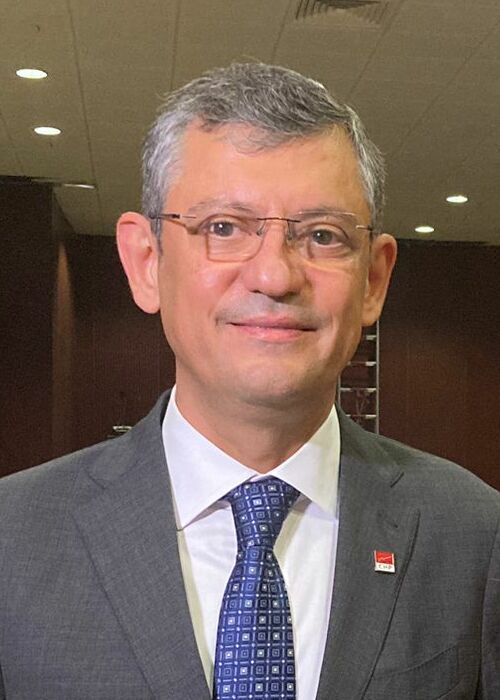

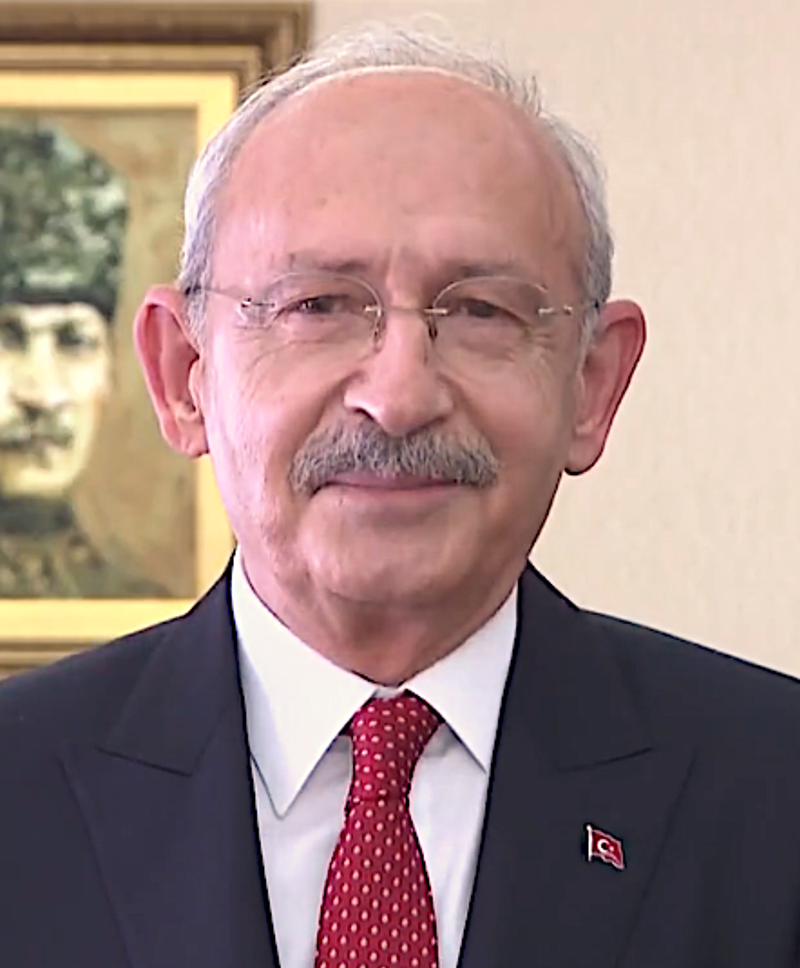
Candidate	Özgür Özel	Kemal Kılıçdaroğlu
Constituency	Manisa	Not a member of parliament
First round	682 (49.93%)	664 (48.61%)
Runoff	812 (59.44%)	536 (39.24%)
Leader before election
Kemal Kılıçdaroğlu
CHP
Elected Leader
Özgür Özel
CHP

The 38th Republican People's Party Ordinary Convention (Turkish: 38. CHP Olağan Kurultayı), also called the Democracy and Unity Convention (Turkish: Demokrasi ve Birlik Kurultayı) was held on 4–5 November 2023 in Ankara Arena. During the convention, the leader and congress of the Republican People's Party (CHP), the centre-left main opposition party in Turkey, was elected.

Özgür Özel was elected as the party leader, bringing an end to the 13-year tenure of Kemal Kılıçdaroğlu, who first won the position in 2010. Moreover, this marks the only time in the history of the party, except for the short-lived party leader Altan Öymen, that the sitting party leader was defeated in a party congress.

On the second day of the congress, when elections to the party council and the disciplinary committee took place, 1368 delegates cast their votes in total, 1200 of which were determined by the provincial party congresses and 168 of which had the status of natural delegate. According to the results announced on November 6, names close to the incoming party leader Özel were elected to the party organs.

On 8 November 2023, the Supreme Election Council certified Özgür Özel as the new party leader.

The congress about the party rulebook, which was scheduled for 25–26 November 2023, was delayed until 4–8 September 2024 because of the approaching local elections.

On 21 May 2026, the Regional Court of Appeals in Ankara annulled the convention's results, reinstating Kılıçdaroğlu as leader and triggering the 2026 Turkish absolute nullity crisis.

== Background ==
=== Congress calendar ===
According to the meeting of the central executive committee on 6 June 2023, the calendar for the congress was announced. Accordingly, the time period for the elections for the delegates to the district congresses took place between 3–30 July 2023. The newly elected delegates met between 5 August and 10 September to choose the administration of the district party leaders and the delegates to the provincial party congresses. The provincial congresses took place between 16 September and 17 October, when the provincial party administrators and the delegates to the central party congress were elected.

After the conclusion of the provincial congresses, the party council decided on 26 September 2023 that the grand congress would take place on 4–5 November and the party rule congress would take place on 25–26 November.

=== Delegates ===
During the provincial congresses between 16 September and 17 October, which took place in every 81 of the provinces of Turkey, 1200 delegates were elected, corresponding to twice the number of seats in the Grand National Assembly. Additionally, CHP members of parliament, members of the party council and the disciplinary committee cast their votes in the congress as natural delegates.

Out of the 1368 delegates, 1200 of which were determined in the regional congresses and the remaining 168 are classified as natural delegates, 1366 delegates cast their votes.

== The congress ==
The congress took place on 4–5 November 2023 in the Ankara Arena. The presidium of the congress was led by the mayor of Istanbul, Ekrem İmamoğlu. On the first day of the congress, elections took place for the new party leader and on the second day, the elections to the party organs took place.

Candidate for the party leadership Özgür Özel stated that he would be pleased by İmamoğlu's chairship of the congress. The slogan for the congress was chosen to be "The Congress for Democracy and Peace for the Second Century of the Republic".

=== Elections for the party leadership ===
The elections for the position of party leader took place on Saturday, 4 November.

Despite not having announced his candidacy yet, Kemal Kılıçdaroğlu collected signatures from the delegates and was nominated as a candidate for the party leader. At the same time, deputy leader of the parliamentary group of CHP, Özgür Özel, member of the party council between 2003 and 2008, Örsan Kunter Öymen, former MP İlhan Cihaner and party member Ünal Karahasan announced their candidacies for the leadership.

The candidates needed the signature of 5% of the delegates attending the congress to appear on the ballot, which amounted to 69 delegates. Only Kılıçdaroğlu and Özel fulfilled this requirement, and thus appeared on the ballot.

=== First round ===
Results of the first round
1. Özgür Özel (49.9%)
2. Kemal Kılıçdaroğlu (48.6%)

In the first round, Özgür Özel led Kılıçdaroğlu by 18 votes. Since an absolute majority of the delegates were required for the position and Özel was 2 votes short of that, a second round was held afterwards.

Candidate	Votes	%
Özgür Özel	682	49.9
Kemal Kılıçdaroğlu	664	48.6
Invalid/blank votes	20	1.5
Total	1,366	100.0

==== Second round ====
Results of the second round
1. Özgür Özel (59.4%)
2. Kemal Kılıçdaroğlu (39.2%)

The second round took place on 5 November between 00.30 and 02.30. Özgür Özel would win this round in a landslide, becoming the eighth leader of the Republican People's Party.

Candidate	Votes	%
Özgür Özel	812	59.44
Kemal Kılıçdaroğlu	536	39.24
Invalid/blank votes	18	1.32
Total	1,366	100.0

=== Elections for the party organs ===
On Sunday, 5 November the 60 members of the party council and the 15 members of the party disciplinary committee were determined. Özgür Özel and Oğuz Kaan Salıcı would create a list of members for the two organs, whereas Kılıçdaroğlu would not create such a list. The number of votes received by each candidate is shown in parentheses.

==== Party council ====
===== Elected directly (52 members) =====
- Gökan Zeybek (648)
- Özgür Karabat (643)
- Bedirhan Berk Doğru (633-G)
- Ozan Işık (606)
- Deniz Yücel (596)
- Gamze Taşcıer (589-K)
- Murat Bakan (582)
- Suat Özçağdaş (576)
- Cem Aydın (574-G)
- Baki Aydöner (555)
- Ensar Aytekin (554)
- Meryem Gül Çiftçi Binici (542-K)
- Selin Sayek Böke (541-K)
- Canan Taşer (528-G)
- Pınar Uzun Okakın (521-K)
- Mahir Yüksel (518)
- Erhan Adem (516)
- Burhanettin Bulut (501)
- Ecevit Keleş (501)
- Ali Abbas Ertürk (499)
- Hikmet Erbilgin (492)
- Ali Haydar Fırat (489)
- Bülent Nuri Çavuşoğlu (484)
- Hüseyin Yaşar (467)
- Berker Esen (466-G)
- Ulaş Karasu (463)
- Müslim Sarı (462)
- Deniz Yavuzyılmaz (461)
- Zeliha Aksaz Şahbaz (469-K)
- Özgür Ceylan (455)
- Hikmet Yalım Halıcı (447)
- Erbil Aydınlık (444-K)
- Sevgi Kılıç (440-K)
- Yalçın Görgöz (434)
- Orhan Sarıbal (434)
- Turgay Özcan (422)
- Melisa Uğraş (421-G)
- Mehmet Tüm (416)
- Ali Haydar Hakverdi (415)
- Sinem Kırçiçek (407-G)
- Semra Dinçer (388-K)
- Hüseyin Can Güner (383-G)
- Ahmet Hakan Uyanık (376-G)
- Şengül Yeşildal (360-K)
- Emin Umut Dikili (358-G)
- Nazan Güneysu (320-K)
- Koza Yardımcı (318-K)
- Mehmet Alkın Denizaslanı (296-G)
- Aylin Nazlıaka (305-K)
- Saniye Barut (296-K)
- Gonca Yelda Orhan (259-K)
- Gizem Coşkun (252-G)

===== Elected through the quota for science, culture and administration (8 members) =====
- Yankı Bağcıoğlu (851)
- Yalçın Karatepe (829)
- Volkan Demir (800)
- Baran Bozoğlu (796)
- İlhan Uzgel (784)
- Gülşah Deniz Atalar (772)
- Fethi Açıkel (745)
- Gökçe Gökçen (719)

==== Disciplinary committee (15 members) ====
- Ayça Akpek Şenay (626)
- Esin Fatma Temel (546)
- Hümeyra Akkuş Sandıkcı (546)
- İsmail Emre Telci (539)
- Ekincan Aksoy (533)
- Özkan Tice (527)
- Aysemin Gülmez (524)
- Deniz Çakır (523)
- Süleyman Bülbül (522)
- Deniz Demiröz (521)
- Nurdan Yüceal (498)
- Turan Taşkın Özer (463)
- Ali Balta (456)
- Özgür Sağlam (440)
- Remzi Kazmaz (304)
