= New Party (Turkey, 2026) =

Turkish political party

New Party YENİ Parti
- Abbreviation: YEP (unofficial)
- Leader: Özgür Özel
- Secretary-General: Yunus Emre
- Spokesperson: Zeynel Emre
- Parliamentary leader: Özgür Özel
- Founder: Özgür Özel
- Founded: 24 July 2026; 3 months ago
- Split from: Republican People's Party
- Headquarters: Çankaya, Ankara
- Youth wing: New Youth
- Membership (2026): ▲745,790
- Ideology: Social democracy Kemalism; Progressivism; Big tent
- Political position: Centre-left
- European affiliation: Party of European Socialists
- International affiliation: Socialist International
- Colors: Red; White
- Slogan: Özgür Türkiye, Özgür Gelecek ("Free Turkey, Free Future")
- Grand National Assembly: 90 / 600
- Metropolitan municipalities: 4 / 30
- Provinces: 20 / 51
- District municipalities: 194 / 922
- Belde Municipalities: 34 / 390
- Provincial councilors: 4 / 1,282
- Municipal Assemblies: 107 / 20,953

Website
- yeni-parti.org.tr

The New Party (Turkish: Yeni Parti, styled as YENİ Parti) is a social democratic political party in Turkey, founded by Özgür Özel following his removal as chairman of the Republican People's Party (CHP) by a controversial judicial ruling in May 2026. A splinter of the CHP, it was launched as a contingency plan for a potential snap election.

The party has since become the main opposition in the Turkish parliament following the mass defection of former CHP MPs, making it the second largest parliamentary group. The jailed mayor of Istanbul, Ekrem İmamoğlu, announced his full support for the newly created party shortly after its founding. The party also fully supports Turkey's accession of the European Union and enlargement of NATO.

== History ==
The establishment of the party has been compared by political commentators to earlier splinters within Turkey's center-left tradition. Analysts have drawn parallels between Özgür Özel's political platform and the "left of center" movement led by Bülent Ecevit in the 1970s, which similarly advocated for reformist leadership grounded in grassroots support. That earlier movement resulted in Ecevit's election as the chairman of the Republican People's Party (CHP) at the party's 1972 convention.

Following the dissolution of political parties after the 1980 Turkish coup d'état, the center-left electorate was split among several entities, including the Populist Party (HP), the Social Democracy Party (SODEP), the Social Democratic Populist Party (SHP), and the Democratic Left Party (DSP).

=== Increasing pressure on the opposition ===
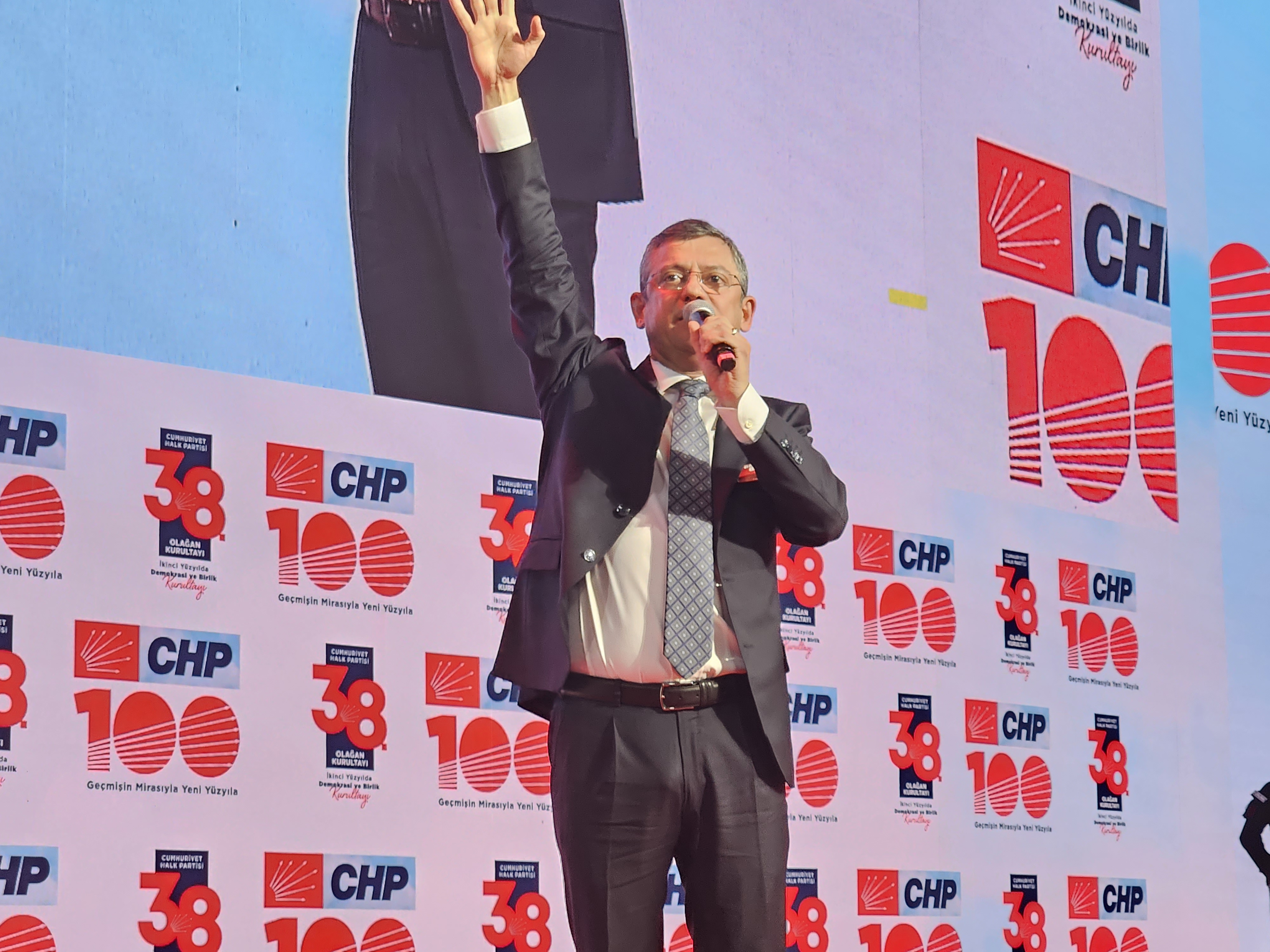
Özgür Özel addressing the 38th Ordinary Convention in November 2023

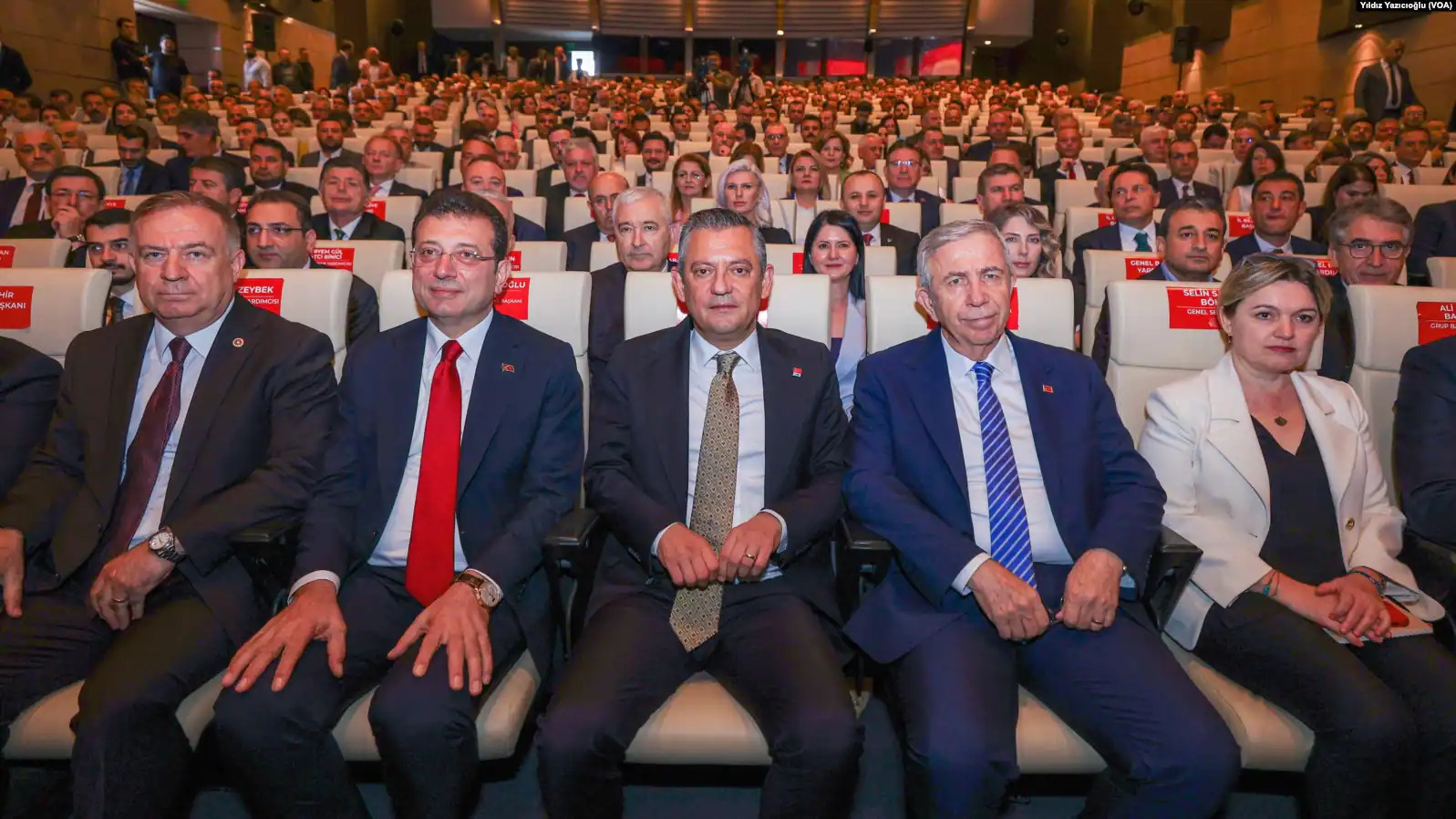
Ekrem İmamoğlu, Özgür Özel, and Mansur Yavaş

Following the loss of the parliamentary majority by the Nation Alliance in the 2023 general election and the defeat of CHP presidential candidate Kemal Kılıçdaroğlu in the presidential runoff, an internal reform movement emerged within the CHP led by parliamentary group chairman Özgür Özel and Istanbul Mayor Ekrem İmamoğlu. At the 38th Ordinary Convention held on 4–5 November 2023, Özgür Özel defeated long time chairman Kemal Kılıçdaroğlu for the party chairmanship. In the subsequent local elections of 31 March 2024, the CHP won the election with 38% of the vote, beating the AKP for the first time. The election result, alongside the increasing effects of the economic crisis, led to increased opposition calls for early elections. As Ekrem İmamoğlu emerged as a prospective presidential candidate, CHP leader Özel announced that the candidate selection process would be determined through a primary election.

Following legal proceedings, İmamoğlu and several CHP mayors were arrested on 19 March 2025. The arrests led to nationwide protests, while international human rights organizations described the judicial actions as politically motivated efforts to target an opposition figure. In response, Özel held a presidential primary election, framing the vote as a demonstration of solidarity. In the primary held on 23 March 2025, in which 15 million voters participated across CHP local organizations, İmamoğlu received a majority of the votes and was officially declared the party's presidential candidate.

=== Absolute nullity crisis and CHP internal power struggle ===
The 36th Civil Chamber of the Ankara Regional Court of Justice issued an absolute nullity ruling regarding the party's convention, ordering the removal of Özel as chairman and the transfer of managerial duties to Kılıçdaroğlu. This legal decision followed the arrest of İmamoğlu and former Kılıçdaroğlu's support for lawsuits alleging irregularities at the party's convention. Prior to the ruling, President Recep Tayyip Erdoğan and Nationalist Movement Party (MHP) Chairman Devlet Bahçeli publicly called on Özel to distance himself from İmamoğlu. Özel rejected these calls in a series of public rallies stating that the court ruling taken against the party leadership was politically motivated for not aligning with the governing coalition. Many CHP politicians accused Kılıçdaroğlu of being a government trustee who would turn the party into controlled opposition.

On 24 May 2026, law enforcement executed an eviction order against Özel's party administration at the party headquarters following a legal petition by Kılıçdaroğlu's legal team. In response, Özel and party supporters initiated a march toward the TBMM. Kılıçdaroğlu referred nine members of parliament for expulsion, and it was alleged that Kılıçdaroğlu's team was also preparing for the expulsion of Özel. On 13 July 2026, Kılıçdaroğlu claimed that Özel and İmamoğlu were supported by Gülenists, a common canard in Turkish politics.

On 17 June 74 out of 81 provincial chairs supporting Özel delivered a request for an extraordinary party convention to the party headquarters. The Kılıçdaroğlu party administration rejected the request, referred three figures including Istanbul Provincial Chairman Özgür Çelik to the party's high disciplinary board with a request for expulsion, and dissolved the Ankara Provincial Administration and the CHP Women's Branch management.

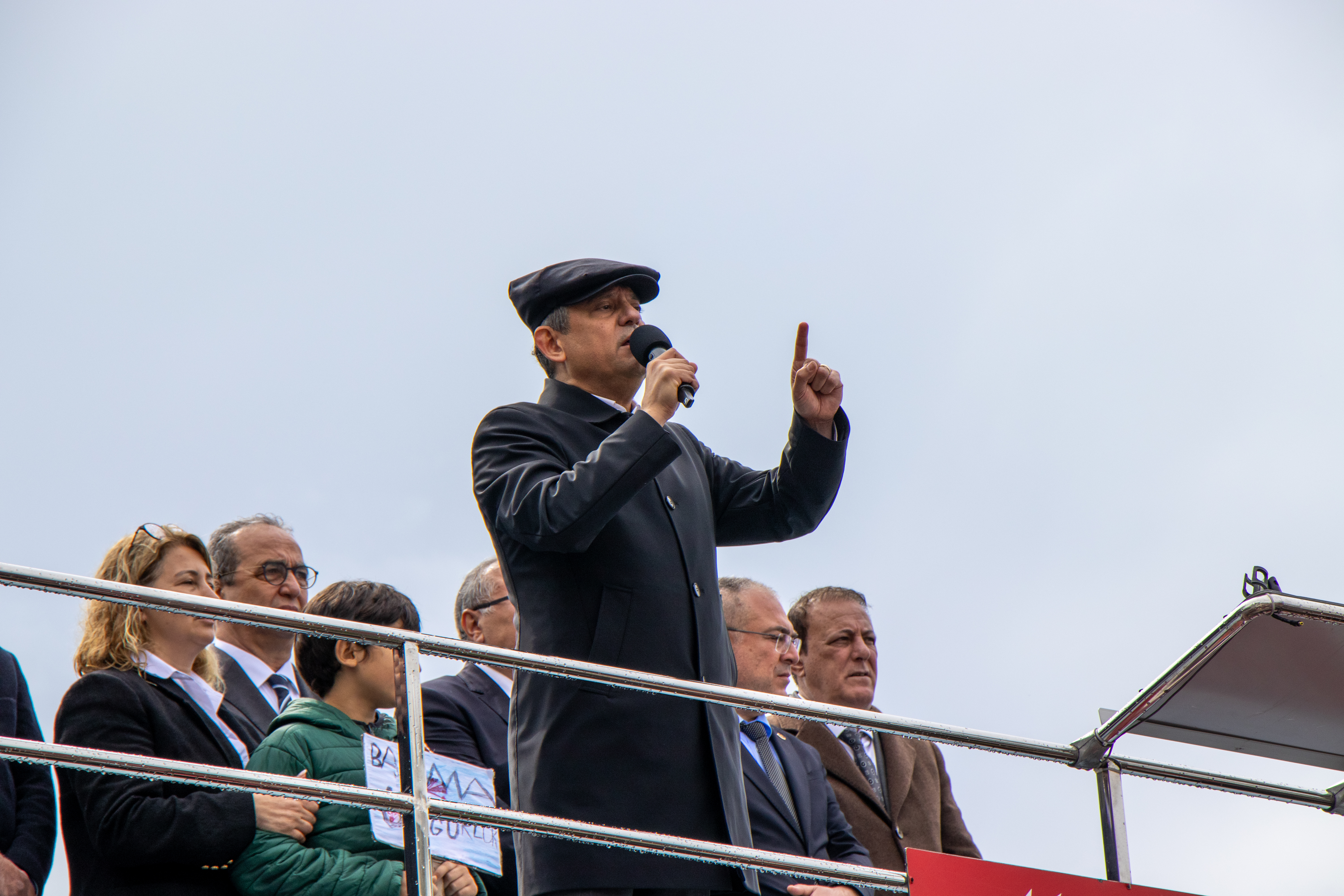
Özgür Özel at the "Claiming the People's Will" rally on 29 March 2026

In June 2026, İzmir Mayor Cemil Tugay and Bolu Mayor Tanju Özcan denounced the Kılıçdaroğlu party administration and resigned from the CHP. Several MPs did the same, and called on Özel to establish a new political party. On 22 June 2026, CHP overseas branches supporting Özel held a rally in front of the European Court of Human Rights (ECtHR) in Strasbourg in reaction to the absolute nullity ruling.

=== Formation of the party ===
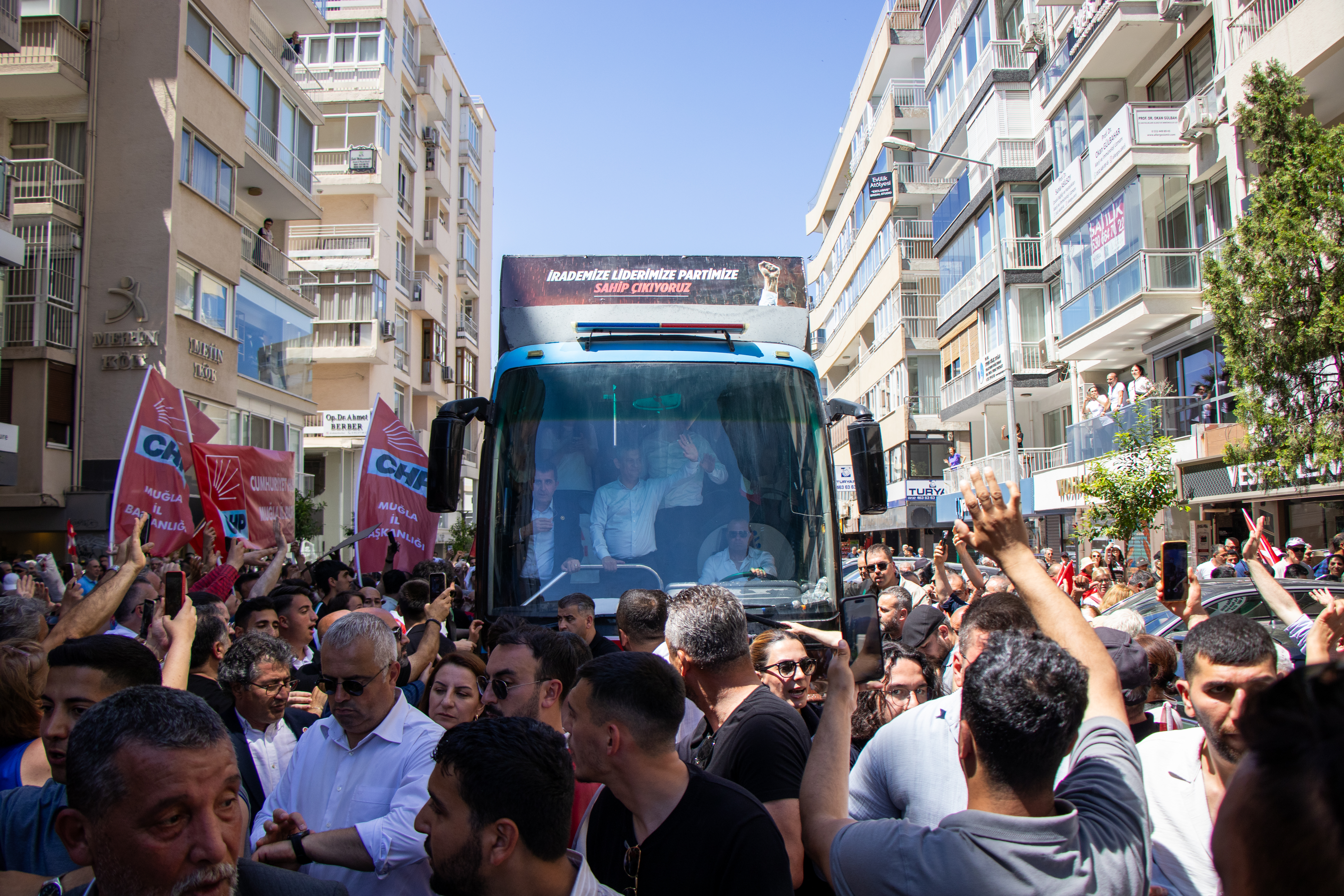
Özgür Özel in İzmir following the absolute nullity ruling, May 2026

On 21 July 2026, Özel announced he was founding a new party in his farewell speech to the CHP parliamentary group, sharply criticizing Kılıçdaroğlu's stance following the 2023 election defeat, the transfer of party headquarters via court ruling, and the expulsions within the party. Özel further alleged that the ruling bloc and "deep state" offered him the party leadership for 30 years in exchange for dropping support for İmamoğlu and engaging in "Ankara-centered politics", but that he rejected the "controlled opposition" model.

On 24 July, Özel officially amended the new political party, along with 91 members of parliament from the CHP moving to the newly-established party. After the transfer, the New Party became the main opposition, and the first party to achieve that status without entering any election. On 2 October, Socialist International replaced the CHP with the New Party as a full member for Turkey's delegation.

== Political position and ideology ==
Emphasizing that politically they would remain Kemalist and committed to the values of social democracy, Özel called on conservatives, liberals, nationalists, Kurds, and socialists who have no issues with Mustafa Kemal Atatürk, the Republic, and the National Pact to unite alongside social democrats.

=== Foreign policy ===
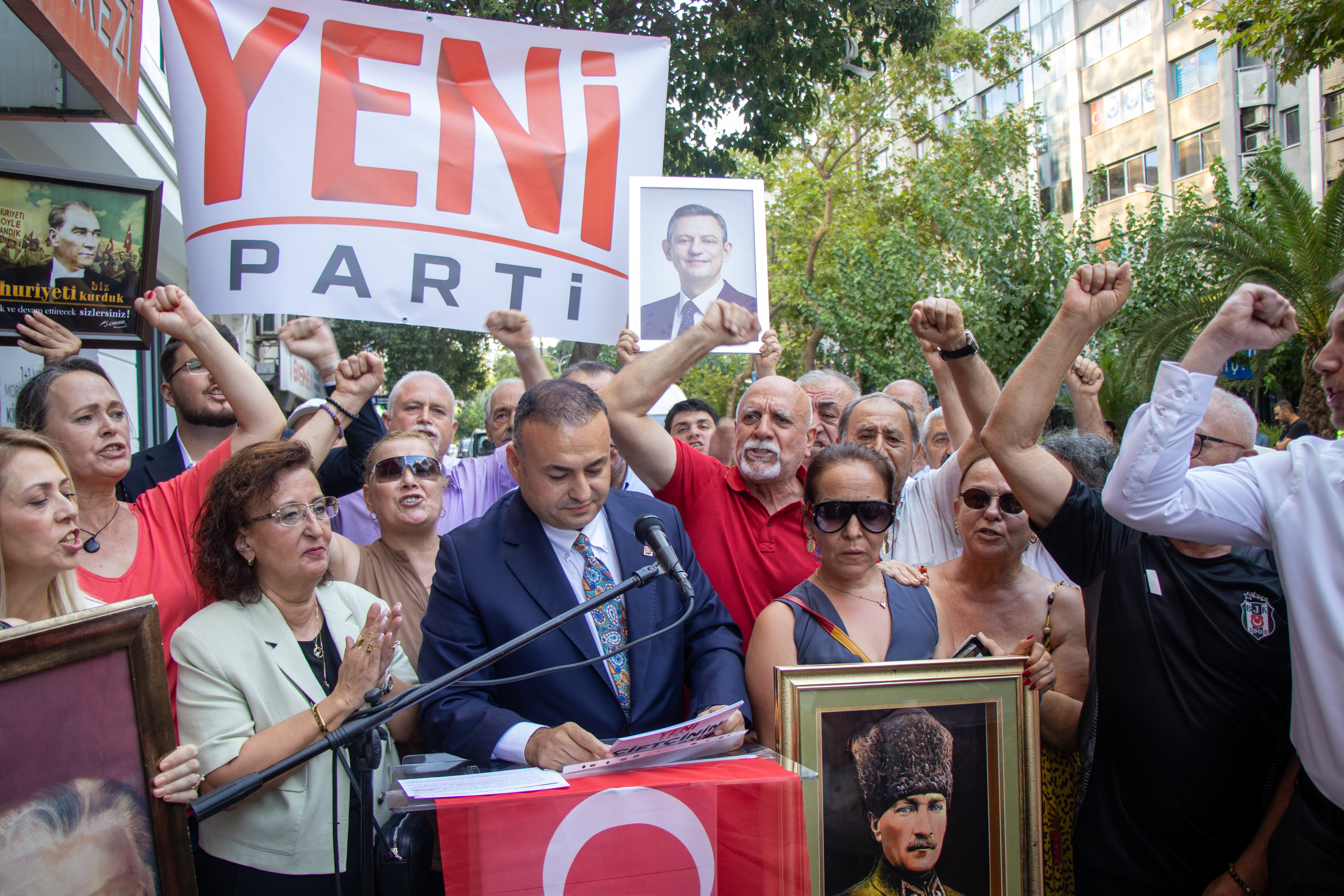
Mass resignation of Konak CHP members to the New Party

The party embraces Mustafa Kemal Atatürk's foreign policy doctrine, that is, standing as a "mediator" and avoiding conflict at all costs while also safeguarding Turkey's national interests. According to its platform, the party is strongly in favor of Turkey's accession into the European Union and NATO, also pledges to implement democratic reforms to overturn the "authoritarian" Erdoganist policies. Enhancing the country's presence within NATO, the OSCE, and the Council of Europe is in the New Party's agenda. Özel is a strong critic of the United States under Donald Trump and his ambassador to Ankara Tom Barrack. The New Party seeks to have Turkey as a regional power by investing in soft power. The party seeks to transform the Turkish Armed Forces into a professional, non-political institution.

== Party leaders ==
#	Name	Portrait	Took office	Left office	Tenure
1	Özgür Özel 21 September 1974 (age 52)		24 July 2026 (assumes office)	Incumbent	

== Conventions ==
Convention	Date	Leader	Reason for election
1st	TBD	TBD	

== See also ==
- Republican People's Party
- Politics of Turkey
