= Özgür Özel =

Turkish politician (born 1974)

Özgür Özel MP
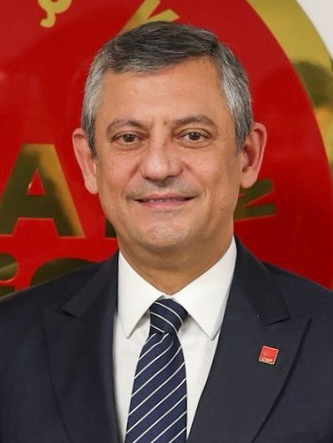
- Özel in 2026

Leader of the Main Opposition
- Incumbent
- Assumed office 24 July 2026
- President: Recep Tayyip Erdoğan
- Preceded by: Kemal Kılıçdaroğlu
- In office 8 November 2023 – 21 May 2026
- President: Recep Tayyip Erdoğan
- Preceded by: Kemal Kılıçdaroğlu
- Succeeded by: Kemal Kılıçdaroğlu

Leader of the New Party
- Incumbent
- Assumed office 24 July 2026
- Preceded by: Office established

Leader of the Republican People's Party
- In office 8 November 2023 – 21 May 2026
- Preceded by: Kemal Kılıçdaroğlu
- Succeeded by: Kemal Kılıçdaroğlu

Member of the Grand National Assembly
- Incumbent
- Assumed office 12 June 2011
- Constituency: Manisa (2011, June 2015, Nov 2015, 2018, 2023)

Personal details
- Born: 21 September 1974 (age 52) Manisa, Turkey
- Party: New Party (since 2026)
- Other political affiliations: CHP (2009–2026)
- Spouse: Didem Özel
- Children: 1
- Education: Pharmacology at Ege University
- Website: ozgurozel.org

Özgür Özel (Turkish: [œzˈɟyɾ œˈzæl]) (born 21 September 1974) is a Turkish pharmacist and politician who has served as leader of the New Party since 2026, and served as leader of the Republican People's Party (CHP) from 2023 before being deposed in 2026. He had previously shared the parliamentary deputy group leadership of the CHP with Engin Altay and Levent Gök between 2015 and 2023. Following a court ruling in May 2026, his leadership of the CHP was subject to absolute nullification, triggering the CHP absolute nullity crisis. In July 2026, Özel announced that he would be leaving the CHP to form the New Party.

Özel has been an MP for the electoral district of Manisa since the 2011 general election and is well known for his activism concerning the rights of miners in Manisa Province. Since February 2024, he has served as vice president of the Socialist International.

== Early life and career ==
=== Education ===
Özgür Özel was born in Manisa on 21 September 1974. He comes from a Balkan Turkish family originating from Skopje, North Macedonia and Thessaloniki, Greece and completed his primary education in Manisa. After completing his secondary education, he started college at İzmir Bornova Anatolian High School but returned to Manisa to complete high school. He graduated from Ege University Faculty of Pharmacy.

=== Pharmacist ===
After graduating from university, Özel worked in an independent pharmacy practice from 1999. He served as the Secretary-General of the Manisa Chamber of Pharmacists between 2001 and 2007 and held the position of Chamber President for two terms. He also took on the roles of Spokesperson and President in the Manisa Academic Associations Union during the same years. Starting in 2007, he has served as an executive board member, accountant and two-term General Secretary for the Turkish Pharmacists Association, having made numerous statements and presentations in 163 different congresses and conferences. Özel is also a member of the International Pharmacists Federation, the European Union Pharmacists Group and the European Pharmacists Forum. Between 2007 and 2011, he served as the treasurer of the Turkish Pharmacists' Association for one term and held the position of Secretary-General for two terms.

== Early political career ==
=== Republican People's Party ===
Özel was elected as a Member of Parliament for the electoral district of Manisa in the 2011 general election and was re-elected in June 2015 and November 2015. He was elected to the CHP party council in the party's 18th Extraordinary Convention held in September 2014. At the start of the short-lived 25th Parliament on 24 June 2015, he was elected as a CHP parliamentary deputy group leader and was re-elected at the start of the 26th Parliament in November 2015, where he served alongside Engin Altay and Levent Gök.

Özel took on important responsibilities as an MP, including roles in the Health, Family, Labor, and Social Affairs Committee, the CHP Prisons Monitoring and Inspection Committee, the CHP Universities and Student Issues Research Committee and the Parliamentary Soma Mine Research Committee. In 2015, Özel was awarded the Uğur Mumcu Politician of the Year Award by the Atatürkist Thought Association and the Contemporary Journalists Association. In the 25th, 26th, and 27th legislative terms, he served as the Deputy Chairman of the Republican People's Party (CHP) Parliamentary Group, overseeing the CHP's work in the Parliament. He served as the Chairman of the CHP Parliamentary Group between 2015 and 2023.

=== Soma mine disaster ===
Özel, along with other CHP MPs from Manisa, made worldwide headlines following the Soma mine disaster in May 2014, where 301 miners were killed after coal mine collapsed in Soma, Manisa Province. The disaster caused large-scale criticism of the Justice and Development Party (AK Party) government, since it had rejected a parliamentary motion that Özel had put forward to investigate mining incidents in Soma and other mining towns just two months before the disaster. His speeches before and after the disaster received nationwide attention.

=== CHP leadership candidacy ===
In 2023, Özel ran for party leadership at the 38th Republican People's Party Ordinary Convention. Özel criticized Kemal Kılıçdaroğlu for stifling internal democracy and said that the party's leader should be elected democratically. He also objected to Kılıçdaroğlu's analogy of "delivering the party to a safe harbor", asking "Who dragged that ship [CHP] into dangerous waters?" Kılıçdaroğlu's ticket sharing deal to elect 36 deputies from minor parties aligned with the CHP was also severely criticized. In the second round of the CHP congress held on 5 November 2023, Özel was elected the new leader of the CHP.

== Leader of the Republican People's Party ==
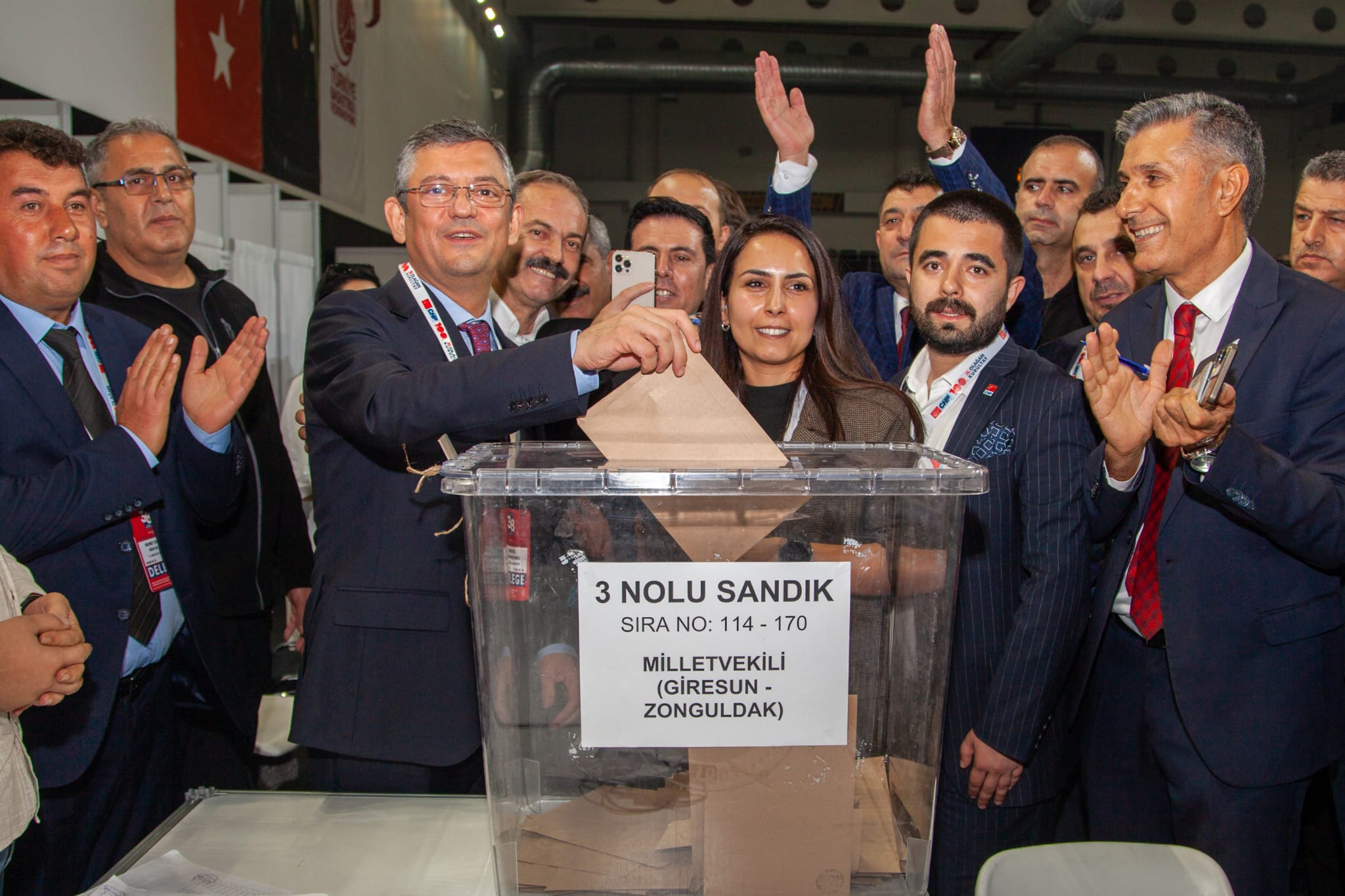
Özel voting in the first round of the 38th CHP Ordinary Convention, 4 November 2023

Özel's first electoral test as leader came in the 2024 Turkish local elections, where the results were described as a "spectacular upset" victory for the opposition CHP, which despite the lack of any electoral pacts managed to retain all but one of its metropolitan mayoralties, while winning four more. In particular, the party's candidates in Turkey's largest city Istanbul and capital Ankara, Ekrem İmamoğlu and Mansur Yavaş, were re-elected by landslide 51% and 60%, respectively. Both mayors also won majorities in their respective metropolitan councils. The CHP also won many unexpected victories in areas that had been under AKP control for the previous two decades, including Bursa, Balıkesir, Manisa, Kütahya, Adıyaman, Amasya, Kırıkkale, Kilis and Denizli. The party also managed to win swathes of districts within many provinces, many of which delivered vote swings of over 30% in the CHP's favor. Overall, the CHP won 35 of Turkey's 81 provincial capitals, with the People's Alliance winning 32. This was the first nationwide election since 1977 where the CHP came first in the popular vote.

In September 2024, Özel announced that his party fully supports Turkey's membership in the European Union, that they will continue accession negotiations if they win the next Turkish general elections, and that Turkey will become a full member of the EU as soon as possible. In 2025, Özel criticized the arrest and detention of Istanbul's mayor and CHP member Ekrem İmamoğlu, calling it a "a coup against our next president". He has since been involved in the 2025 Turkish protests that followed İmamoğlu's imprisonment, during which Özel called for a boycott of firms believed to be close to President Recep Tayyip Erdoğan. On 4 May 2025, Özel was struck in the face by an assailant while he was attending a memorial service for MP Sırrı Süreyya Önder in Istanbul. The suspected attacker was detained. On 21 September 2025, Özel was reelected as leader of the CHP following a special congress.

In May 2026, the Ankara Regional Court of Justice 36th Civil Chamber annulled the 2023 leadership contest between Özel and Kılıçdaroğlu over perceived irregularities and vote-buying, reinstating Kılıçdaroğlu as leader. The ruling was highly controversial and was viewed as a sham effort by Erdoğan to subdue the CHP and crack down on the opposition. On 21 July 2026, Özel announced he would be leaving the CHP to form a new party. According to Cumhuriyet, the new political party already had 100 CHP MPs willing to join. On 24 July 2026, Özgür Özel formally resigned from the Republican People's Party (CHP) following ongoing internal governance disputes and subsequent court rulings regarding the party's leadership. His departure was accompanied by a group of parliamentary members, leading to a reorganization of the party's representation in the Grand National Assembly of Turkey.

== Controversies ==
During his tenure as leader of the Republican People's Party (CHP), Özel has been involved in several legal and political controversies. In the aftermath of the 2023 CHP Ordinary Congress, prosecutors opened investigations and filed indictments alleging vote-buying and procedural irregularities in the party's leadership election that resulted in his chairmanship, with the Ankara Chief Public Prosecutor's Office accusing delegates of being offered incentives in exchange for support; the case remains pending.

Özel has faced criminal investigations related to comments made about judicial officials, including probes into alleged "insulting" remarks directed at the president and members of the judiciary, leading to motions to lift his parliamentary immunity. In December 2025, a court ordered Özel to pay compensation to the Minister of National Defense over his 2018 parliamentary remarks criticizing the minister's conduct, underscoring his history of outspoken and contentious parliamentary exchanges. An Ankara court ordered Özel to pay the president 300,000 lira ($6,500) in damages for remarks about Erdoğan, including calling him an "oppressor".

=== Founding of New Party ===
The 38th Ordinary Congress in November 2023 and the 21st Extraordinary Congress in April 2025 of the Republican People's Party (CHP) were ordered by a court to be annulled due to a ruling of "absolute nullity" issued in the lawsuit. As a result of the court order, interim suspension of the elected party leader Özel and the party leadership occurred, and Kemal Kılıçdaroğlu and the party bodies existing prior to the congress were restored and continued to perform their duties. As the court-appointed leadership did not set an appropriate early new congress date, the founding of a new party became inevitable for a fraction of the party. 91 CHP parliamentarians, led by Özel resigned from their party, and founded the New Party on 24 July 2026.

== Personal life ==
Özel is married to Didem Özel, and has a daughter, İpek. He speaks Turkish, German and English. He is a Fenerbahçe S.K. fan. During 2024, social media users circulated widely repeated claims that Özel had been shot in the foot, but he publicly denied these allegations, explaining that he injured his foot in a fall at his home and sharing his X-ray images to show the fracture and refute the "shot" narrative.

Party political offices
Preceded by Kemal Kılıçdaroğlu	Leader of the Republican People's Party; 2023–present	Incumbent
Political offices
Preceded by Kemal Kılıçdaroğlu	Leader of the Opposition; 2023–present	Incumbent
