= 2019 Ankara mayoral election =

← 2014	31 March 2019	2024 →
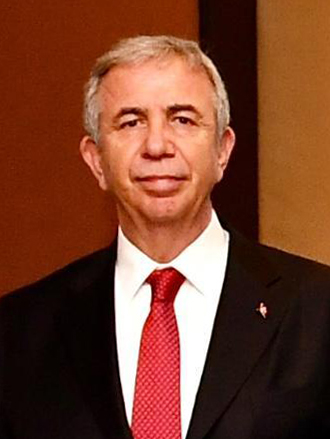

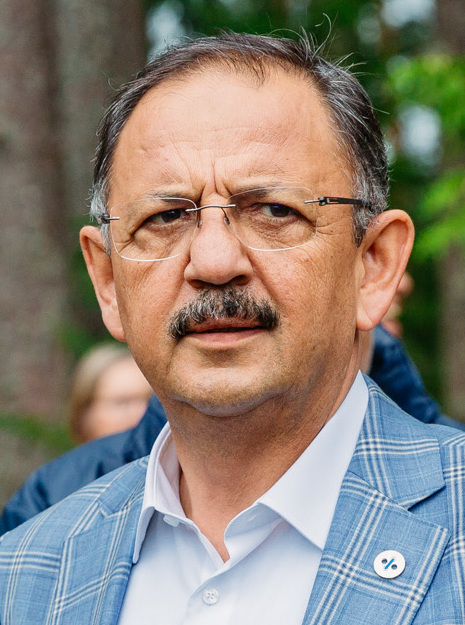
Candidate	Mansur Yavaş	Mehmet Özhaseki
Party	CHP	AK Party
Alliance	Nation	People
Popular vote	1,662,209	1,538,410
Percentage	50.9%	47.1%
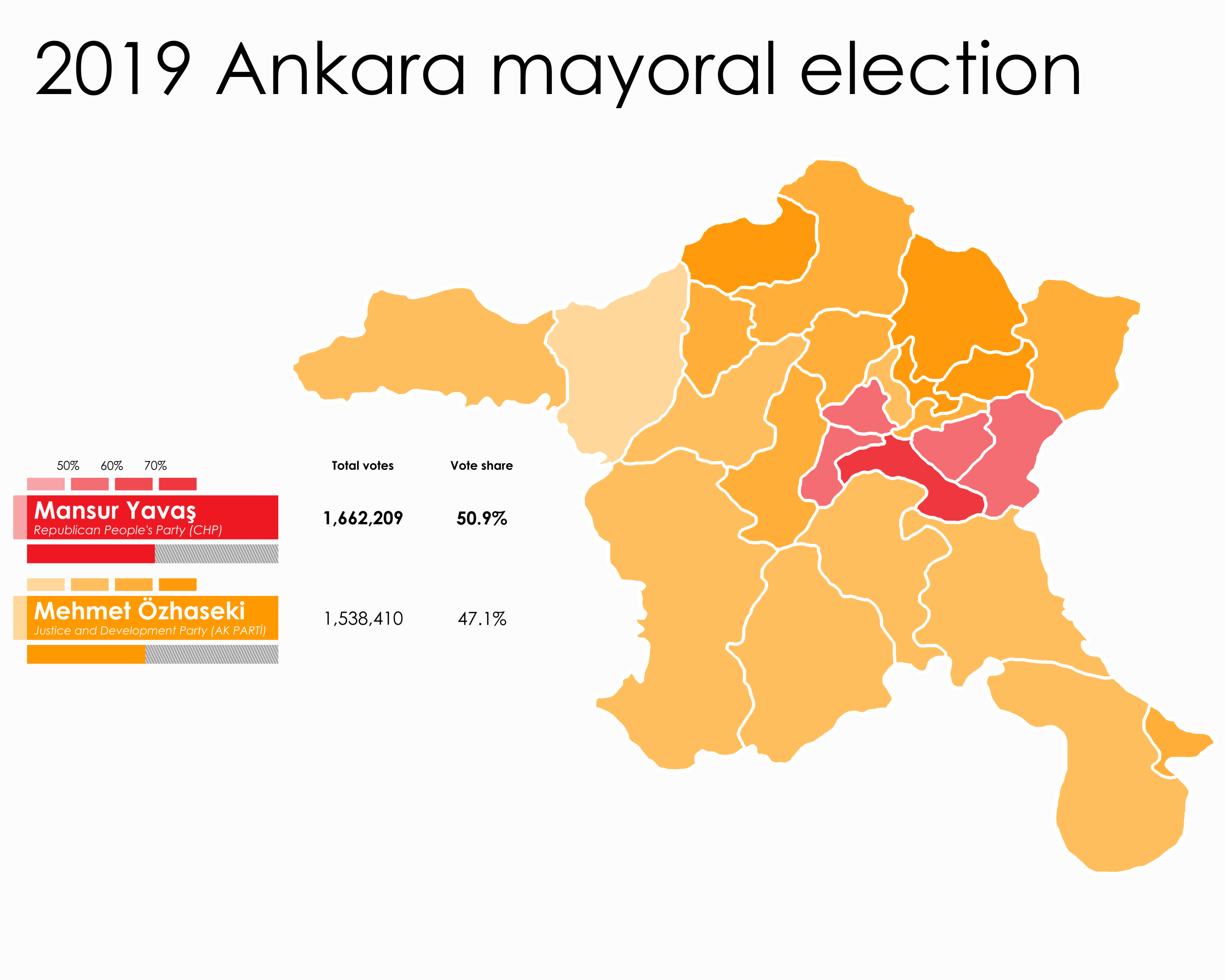
- Election results in the districts of Ankara
Mayor before election
Mustafa Tuna
AK Party
Elected Mayor
Mansur Yavaş
CHP

Mayoral elections were held in the Turkish province of Ankara as part of nationwide local elections on 31 March 2019. A total of 26 mayors, one for each of the 25 districts of Ankara and one for the Ankara Metropolitan Municipality, were elected.

Initial results suggested that opposition candidate Mansur Yavaş was elected with 50% of the vote, compared to the government candidate Mehmet Özhaseki's 47%. Although the AK Party challenged the results and forced recounts in several districts, they were unable to overturn Yavaş's majority. Yavaş's victory was confirmed on 8 April 2019, when he was officially inaugurated mayor.

== Candidates ==
On 27 November 2018, the ruling Justice and Development Party (AKP) announced their metropolitan mayoral candidate to be Mehmet Özhaseki, the former mayor of Kayseri and former Minister of Environment and Urban Planning. Due to the People's Alliance agreement, Özhaseki has the support of the Nationalist Movement Party (MHP).

On 18 December, the main opposition Republican People's Party (CHP) announced their candidate to be Mansur Yavaş, their candidate in the previous election in 2014. Yavaş had narrowly lost the previous election to AKP candidate Melih Gökçek despite accusations of widespread electoral fraud, with many commentators arguing that Yavaş was the true winner of the election. Yavaş has the support of the Good Party and declared himself to be the 'Nation Alliance candidate'.

=== Opinion polling ===
Date	Pollster	Sample size	Özhaseki	Yavaş	Others	Undecided	Lead
31 Mar 2019	2019 election	–	47.1	50.9	2.0	–	3.8
16–17 Mar 2019	Gezici	-	47.7	49.8	2.5	–	2.1
8 March 2019	PIAR	–	44.6	54.1	1.3	–	9.5
8 March 2019	Avrasya	1,940	45.6	51.6	2.8	–	5.0
23–24 Feb 2019	Gezici	–	51.8	46.3	1.9	–	5.5
8–24 Feb 2019	AREA	–	45.5	51.2	3.3	–	5.7
10–16 Feb 2019	PollMark	5,040	32.0	42.1	–	25.9	10.1
31 Jan-2 Feb 2019	PIAR	–	35.8	41.7	–	22.5	5.9
17–31 Jan 2019	ORC	–	36.8	41.9	2.3	19.0	5.1
26–27 Jan 2019	Gezici	–	52.2	47.8	–	–	4.4
19–28 Sep 2018	SAROS	1,620	44.3	54.1	1.6	–	9.8
Alliance			People's AK Party + MHP	Nation CHP + İYİ	None	N/A	N/A
Incumbent			Mustafa Tuna AK Party				

== Results ==
=== Metropolitan municipality mayoral election ===
==== Overall result ====
Candidate	Party	Votes	%
Mansur Yavaş	Republican People's Party	1,662,209	50.93
Mehmet Özhaseki	Justice and Development Party	1,538,410	47.14
Mesut Doğan	Felicity Party	34,182	1.05
Haydar Yılmaz	Democratic Left Party	9,706	0.30
Tülin Oygür	Patriotic Party	6,238	0.19
Mustafa Pak	Independent Turkey Party	5,576	0.17
Fatma Korur	Communist Party of Turkey	4,629	0.14
Sabit Tekin	Independent	724	0.02
Mehmet Hoşoğlu	Independent	613	0.02
Meriç Meydan	Independent	504	0.02
Mehmet Cerit	Independent	440	0.01
Recep Gökyer	Independent	417	0.01
Total		3,263,648	100.00
Valid votes		3,263,648	97.06
Invalid/blank votes		98,993	2.94
Total votes		3,362,641	100.00
Registered voters/turnout		3,925,129	85.67

==== Results by district ====
District	Mansur Yavaş (CHP)		Mehmet Özhaseki (AK Party)		Others		Valid votes		Voter turnout		Registered electors
District	# of votes	%	# of votes	%	# of votes	%	# of votes	%	# of votes	%	Registered electors
Akyurt	4,892	23.8	15,119	73.5	565	2.7	20,576	95.4	21,566	90.3	23,891
Altındağ	73,930	36.1	126,706	61.9	4,173	2.0	204,809	96.4	212,354	83.9	253,248
Ayaş	6,098	48.1	6,416	50.6	155	1.2	12,669	97.6	12,976	94.3	13,756
Bala	9,831	39.5	14,690	59.0	396	1.6	24,917	96.3	25,881	88.6	29,218
Beypazarı	15,567	48.9	15,717	49.4	543	1.7	31,827	96.9	32,838	89.8	36,558
Çamlıdere	2,372	21.0	8,760	77.7	142	1.3	11,274	96.4	11,691	93.4	12,521
Çankaya	437,982	76.9	121,982	21.4	9,610	1.7	569,574	98.1	580,704	85.4	680,264
Çubuk	13,745	25.3	39,149	72.1	1,405	2.6	54,299	96.3	56,412	88.8	63,536
Elmadağ	14,937	51.7	13,255	45.9	685	2.4	28,877	96.8	29,821	91.4	32,614
Etimesgut	185,654	55.3	143,285	42.7	6,880	2.0	335,819	97.4	344,913	85.1	405,522
Evren	956	36.0	1,662	62.6	39	1.5	2,657	95.7	2,776	88.9	3,124
Gölbaşı	35,580	46.6	38,806	50.8	1,946	2.5	76,332	97.0	78,728	87.5	89,967
Güdül	2,740	34.6	5,080	64.1	101	1.3	7,921	96.7	8,193	91.6	8,945
Haymana	10,002	36.3	16,193	58.8	1,362	4.9	27,557	94.6	29,139	89.6	32,521
Kahramankazan	11,211	35.2	20,045	62.9	608	1.9	31,864	96.0	33,203	90.1	36,841
Kalecik	3,316	34.9	6,032	63.5	146	1.5	9,494	95.3	9,966	93.3	10,679
Keçiören	231,671	44.1	282,801	53.9	10,503	2.0	524,975	96.7	542,744	84.0	646,023
Kızılcahamam	6,848	28.5	16,706	69.5	486	2.0	24,040	96.7	24,863	91.5	27,183
Mamak	187,044	50.2	179,659	48.2	6,090	1.6	372,793	97.2	383,503	85.6	448,084
Nallıhan	8,554	44.3	10,356	53.7	386	2.0	19,296	95.9	20,121	89.6	22,455
Polatlı	33,784	47.8	35,516	50.2	1,392	2.0	70,692	96.6	73,183	84.1	87,070
Pursaklar	20,362	25.0	59,066	72.6	1,886	2.3	81,314	96.5	84,229	86.4	97,446
Sincan	101,864	34.8	184,608	63.0	6,480	2.2	292,952	96.3	304,051	85.0	357,827
Şereflikoçhisar	8,347	41.6	11,323	56.4	411	2.0	20,081	94.4	21,261	83.3	25,516
Yenimahalle	234,922	57.7	165,478	40.7	6,639	1.6	407,039	97.5	417,525	86.9	480,320
Ankara	1,662,209	50.9	1,538,410	47.1	63,029	1.9	3,263,648	97.1	3,362,641	85.7	3,925,129

=== District municipality mayoral elections ===
==== Akyurt ====
Akyurt Municipality Mayoral Election
Party	Candidate	Votes	%	±%
AK Party	Hilal Ayık	11,238	54.5	▼1.8
Independent	Hakan Türkdağ	6,488	31.4	−
Other	n/a	2,911	14.1	−
Total valid votes		20,637	95.7	▲0.9
Turnout		21,557	90.2	▼3.7
Registered electors		23,891		▲25.8

==== Altındağ ====
Altındağ Municipality Mayoral Election
Party	Candidate	Votes	%	±%
AK Party	Asım Balcı	130,434	64.4	▲0.8
İYİ	Hasan Yalçıntaş	55,400	27.4	−
Other	n/a	16,608	8.2	−
Total valid votes		202,442	95.4	▼0.1
Turnout		212,159	83.8	▼5.6
Registered electors		253,248		▲1.7

==== Ayaş ====
Ayaş Municipality Mayoral Election
Party	Candidate	Votes	%	±%
AK Party	Burhan Demirbaş	6,554	52.1	▲3.2
CHP	Ali Başkaraağaç	5,802	46.1	▲15.1
Other	n/a	230	1.8	▼18.3
Total valid votes		12,586	97.1	▲0.4
Turnout		12,965	94.2	▼1.4
Registered electors		13,756		▲20.1

==== Bala ====
Bala Municipality Mayoral Election
Party	Candidate	Votes	%	±%
AK Party	Ahmet Buran	15,125	61.0	▲14.9
İYİ	Necati Deli	8,766	35.3	−
Other	n/a	916	3.7	−
Total valid votes		24.807	96.3	▲1.0
Turnout		25,762	88.2	▼3.0
Registered electors		29,218		▲31.7

==== Beypazarı ====
Beypazarı Municipality Mayoral Election
Party	Candidate	Votes	%	±%
AK Party	Tuncer Kaplan	15,292	48.3	▼3.1
İYİ	Veysel Ayık	15,179	48.0	−
Other	n/a	1,183	3.7	−
Total valid votes		31,654	96.7	▲1.3
Turnout		32,750	89.6	▼2.1
Registered electors		36,558		▲3.1

==== Çamlıdere ====
Çamlıdere Municipality Mayoral Election
Party	Candidate	Votes	%	±%
AK Party	Hazım Caner Can	8.229	73.8	▲5.8
İYİ	Vefa Peçenek	2,482	22.3	−
Other	n/a	440	3.9	−
Total valid votes		11,153	95.9	▲2.4
Turnout		11,631	92.9	▲0.9
Registered electors		12,521		▲114.6

==== Çankaya ====
Çankaya Municipality Mayoral Election
Party	Candidate	Votes	%	±%
CHP	Alper Taşdelen	418,740	73.5	▲8.6
AK Party	Amber Türkmen	123,222	21.6	0.0
Other	n/a	27,944	4.9	▼8.6
Total valid votes		569,906	98.2	▲0.8
Turnout		580,514	85.3	▼4.6
Registered electors		680,264		▼0.4

==== Çubuk ====
Çubuk Municipality Mayoral Election
Party	Candidate	Votes	%	±%
AK Party	Baki Demirbaş	35,399	65.5	▲8.8
İYİ	Mustafa Aydos	9,408	17.4	−
Other	n/a	9,243	17.1	−
Total valid votes		54,050	95.9	▲0.2
Turnout		56,349	88.7	▼4.3
Registered electors		63,536		▲11.2

==== Elmadağ ====
Elmadağ Municipality Mayoral Election
Party	Candidate	Votes	%	±%
CHP	Adem Barış Aşkın	15,015	51.9	▲32.3
AK Party	Gökhan Küçükçelebi	13,305	46.0	▲6.5
Other	n/a	625	2.1	▼38.8
Total valid votes		28,945	97.1	▲0.7
Turnout		29,819	91.4	▲2.5
Registered electors		32,614		▲5.6

==== Etimesgut ====
Etimesgut Municipality Mayoral Election
Party	Candidate	Votes	%	±%
MHP	Enver Demirel	164,842	49.6	▲9.8
CHP	Celal Çelik	152,057	45.7	▲25.8
Other	n/a	15,649	4.7	▼35.6
Total valid votes		332,548	96.4	0.0
Turnout		344,898	85.1	▼6.1
Registered electors		405,522		▲23.9

==== Evren ====
Evren Municipality Mayoral Election
Party	Candidate	Votes	%	±%
AK Party	Hüsamettin Ünsal	1,675	63.9	▲12.6
İYİ	Hakan Öcal	918	35.0	−
Other	n/a	29	1.1	−
Total valid votes		2,622	95.2	▲3.0
Turnout		2,755	88.2	▲1.8
Registered electors		3,124		▲29.4

==== Gölbaşı ====
Gölbaşı Municipality Mayoral Election
Party	Candidate	Votes	%	±%
MHP	Ramazan Şimşek	41,055	54.2	▲12.7
İYİ	Mahmut Aksoy	29,626	39.1	−
Other	n/a	5,101	6.7	−
Total valid votes		75,782	96.3	▼0.3
Turnout		78,697	87.5	▼4.5
Registered electors		89,967		▲16.7

==== Güdül ====
Güdül Municipality Mayoral Election
Party	Candidate	Votes	%	±%
AK Party	Muzaffer Yalçın	5,185	66.4	▲26.0
İYİ	Nurullah Ünsal	1,637	21.0	−
Other	n/a	987	12.6	−
Total valid votes		7,809	95.4	▲1.0
Turnout		8,187	91.5	▼0.4
Registered electors		8,945		▲23.4

==== Haymana ====
Haymana Municipality Mayoral Election
Party	Candidate	Votes	%	±%
AK Party	Özdemir Turgut	11,903	43.6	▲4.5
CHP	Hacı Aysu	5,966	21.9	▲17.6
Other	n/a	9,431	34.5	▼22.1
Total valid votes		27,300	94.3	▼0.8
Turnout		28,964	89.1	▼1.2
Registered electors		32,521		▲9.8

==== Kahramankazan ====
Kahramankazan Municipality Mayoral Election
Party	Candidate	Votes	%	±%
AK Party	Serhat Oğuz	17,145	53.3	▼0.1
İYİ	Fazıl Köremezli	14,483	45.0	−
Other	n/a	533	1.7	−
Total valid votes		32,161	96.9	▲0.7
Turnout		33,183	90.1	▼4.2
Registered electors		36,841		▲20.1

==== Kalecik ====
Kalecik Municipality Mayoral Election
Party	Candidate	Votes	%	±%
AK Party	Duhan Kalkan	5,739	60.5	▲3.8
CHP	Hamza Alper Gümüş	2,928	30.9	▲16.1
Other	n/a	819	8.6	▼19.9
Total valid votes		9,486	95.5	▲0.1
Turnout		9,931	93.0	▼1.5
Registered electors		10,679		▲1.8

==== Keçiören ====
Keçiören Municipality Mayoral Election
Party	Candidate	Votes	%	±%
AK Party	Turgut Altınok	332,396	63.6	▲19.8
İYİ	Güçlü Şenel	161,336	30.9	−
Other	n/a	28,481	5.5	−
Total valid votes		522,213	96.2	▲1.0
Turnout		542,592	84.0	▼6.8
Registered electors		646,023		▲5.9

==== Kızılcahamam ====
Kızılcahamam Municipality Mayoral Election
Party	Candidate	Votes	%	±%
AK Party	Süleyman Acar	14,519	60.3	▲6.5
İYİ	Coşkun Ünal	8,928	37.1	−
Other	n/a	637	2.6	−
Total valid votes		24,084	97.1	▲1.7
Turnout		24,806	91.3	▼2.0
Registered electors		27,183		▲23.0

==== Mamak ====
Mamak Municipality Mayoral Election
Party	Candidate	Votes	%	±%
AK Party	Murat Köse	187,714	50.4	▲2.5
CHP	Adnan Demirci	176,190	47.3	▲8.4
Other	n/a	8,763	2.3	▼10.9
Total valid votes		372,667	97.2	▲1.2
Turnout		383,395	85.6	▼6.0
Registered electors		448,084		▲11.4

==== Nallıhan ====
Nallıhan Municipality Mayoral Election
Party	Candidate	Votes	%	±%
AK Party	İsmail Öntaş	10,276	53.6	▲5.7
İYİ	Abdülfettah Güngör	8,501	44.4	−
Other	n/a	385	2.0	−
Total valid votes		19,162	95.4	▲0.4
Turnout		20,088	89.5	▼2.3
Registered electors		23,534		▼4.6

==== Polatlı ====
Polatlı Municipality Mayoral Election
Party	Candidate	Votes	%	±%
MHP	Mürsel Yıldızkaya	39,376	56.3	▲8.8
CHP	Sami Çay	26,809	38.4	▲32.8
Other	n/a	3,725	5.3	▼41.6
Total valid votes		69,910	95.6	▼0.3
Turnout		73,156	84.0	▼5.8
Registered electors		87,070		▲6.5

==== Pursaklar ====
Pursaklar Municipality Mayoral Election
Party	Candidate	Votes	%	±%
AK Party	Ayhan Yılmaz	58,567	72.0	▲8.4
İYİ	Hüseyin Burgaz	15,124	18.6	−
Other	n/a	7,601	9.4	−
Total valid votes		81,292	96.5	▲1.2
Turnout		84,197	86.4	▼5.7
Registered electors		97,446		▲18.9

==== Sincan ====
Sincan Municipality Mayoral Election
Party	Candidate	Votes	%	±%
AK Party	Murat Ercan	194,879	67.6	▲9.8
İYİ	Mehmet Arslan	75,410	26.2	−
Other	n/a	17,979	6.2	−
Total valid votes		288,268	95.7	▲0.3
Turnout		299,123	84.2	▼6.9
Registered electors		357,827		▲9.0

==== Şereflikoçhisar ====
Şereflikoçhisar Municipality Mayoral Election
Party	Candidate	Votes	%	±%
AK Party	Melih Memiş Çelik	11,450	57.3	▲10.9
İYİ	Ercan Ertürk Alıcıoğlu	7,790	39.0	−
Other	n/a	745	3.7	−
Total valid votes		19,985	94.0	▼0.1
Turnout		21,254	83.3	▼2.7
Registered electors		25,516		▲2.6

==== Yenimahalle ====
Yenimahalle Municipality Mayoral Election
Party	Candidate	Votes	%	±%
CHP	Fethi Yaşar	238,187	58.4	▲7.5
AK Party	Veysel Tiryaki	164,156	40.2	▲2.3
Other	n/a	5,873	1.4	▼9.8
Total valid votes		408,216	98.8	▲0.9
Turnout		417,430	86.9	▼4.6
Registered electors		480,320		▲10.3
