= Mayor of Ankara =

- Ankara Başkanı (Turkish)
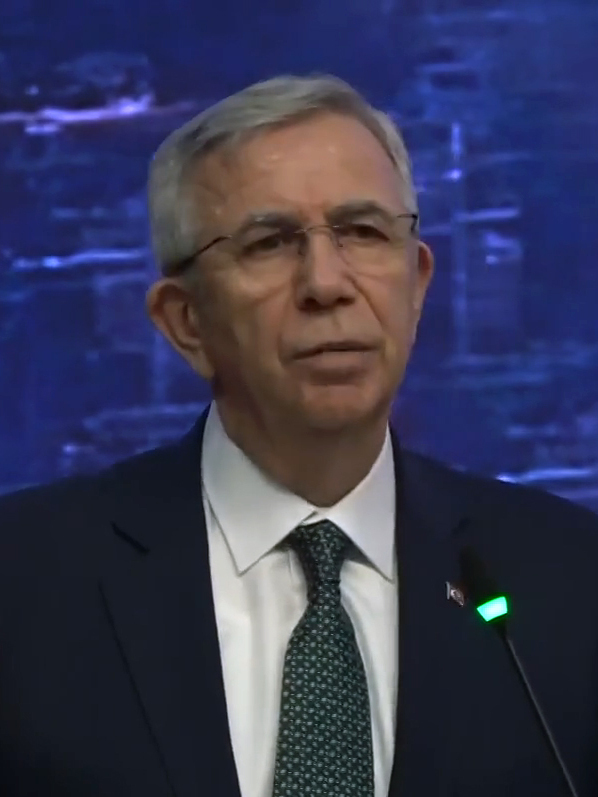
- Incumbent; Mansur Yavaş since 8 April 2019
- Term length: Five years, renewable
- Inaugural holder: Mehmet Ali Bey
- Formation: 1924; 1984 (As Metropolitan Municipality)
- Website: www.ankara.bel.tr

The mayor of the Ankara Metropolitan Municipality (Turkish: Ankara Büyükşehir Belediye Başkanı) is the head of the city of Ankara. The mayor is elected popularly every five years.

== Governors as mayors (1924–1960) ==
- 1 Mehmet Ali Bey (1924–1924)
- 2 Ali Haydar Bey (1924–1926)
- 3 Asaf Bey (1926–1928)
- 4 Nevzat Tandoğan (1929–1946)
- 5 O. Sabri Adal (1946–1946)
- 6 İzzettin Çağpar (1946–1948)
- 7 Ragıp Tüzün (1948–1950)
- 8 Fuat Börekçi (1950)
- 9 Atıf Benderlioğlu (1950–1954)
- 10 Kemal Aygün (1954–1955)
- 11 Cemal Göktan (1955)
- 12 Orhan Eren (1955–1957)
- 13 Kemal Aygün (1957–1958)
- 14 Dilaver Argun (1958–1960)

== Military rule (1960–1963) ==
After the coup d'état on May 27, 1960, the military appointed mayors until 1963.

- 15 İrfan Baştuğ (1960)
- 16 İhsan Orgun (1960–1961)
- 17 Nuri Teoman (1961–1962)
- 18 Enver Kuray (1962–1963)

== Elected mayors (1963–1980) ==
The municipality act of July 27, 1963, enabled the election of the mayor. The polls held on November 17, 1963, were the first regional elections to elect the mayor.

- 19 Halil Sezai Erkut (1963–1968)
- 20 Ekrem Barlas (1968–1973)
- 21 Vedat Dalokay (1973–1977) (CHP)
- 22 Ali Dinçer (1977–1980) (CHP)

== Military rule (1980–1984) ==
After the coup d'état on September 12, 1980, the military appointed mayors until 1984.

With the act of December 4, 1981, the municipality of some big cities in Turkey was reorganized to meet the changed requirements.

- 23 Süleyman Önder (September 15, 1980 – March 30, 1984) (appointed)

== Ankara Metropolitan Municipality (1984–present) ==
On March 8, 1984, the metropolitan municipality act was put into force.

| No. | Portrait | Name (Birth–Death) | Term of office | | | Political party | Notes |
| No. | Portrait | Name (Birth–Death) | Took office | Left office | Time in office | Political party | Notes |
|---|---|---|---|---|---|---|---|
| 24 | | Mehmet Altınsoy (1924–2007) | 26 March 1984 | 26 March 1989 | 5 years, 0 days | ANAP | |
| 25 | | Murat Karayalçın (born 1943) | 26 March 1989 | 21 September 1993 | 9 years, 179 days | SHP | |
| 26 | | Vedat Aydın (1955–2020) | 21 September 1993 | 27 March 1994 | 187 days | SHP | |
| 27 | | Melih Gökçek (born 1948) | 27 March 1994 | 27 October 2017 | 23 years, 214 days | RP/FP (until 2001) | Re-elected four times (in 1999, 2004, 2009 and 2014). Resigned at the request of AK Party and incumbent President Recep Tayyip Erdoğan. |
| 27 | | Melih Gökçek (born 1948) | 27 March 1994 | 27 October 2017 | 23 years, 214 days | AK Party (from 2001) | Re-elected four times (in 1999, 2004, 2009 and 2014). Resigned at the request of AK Party and incumbent President Recep Tayyip Erdoğan. |
| 28 | | Mustafa Tuna (born 1957) | 6 November 2017 | 8 April 2019 | 1 year, 153 days | AK Party | Elected by the city council. |
| 29 | | Mansur Yavaş (born 1955) | 8 April 2019 | Incumbent | 7 years, 210 days | CHP | Elected in the 2019 election.Re-elected in the 2024 election |

== See also ==
- History of Ankara
- Timeline of Ankara's history
