= Mansur Yavaş =

Turkish politician and mayor of Ankara

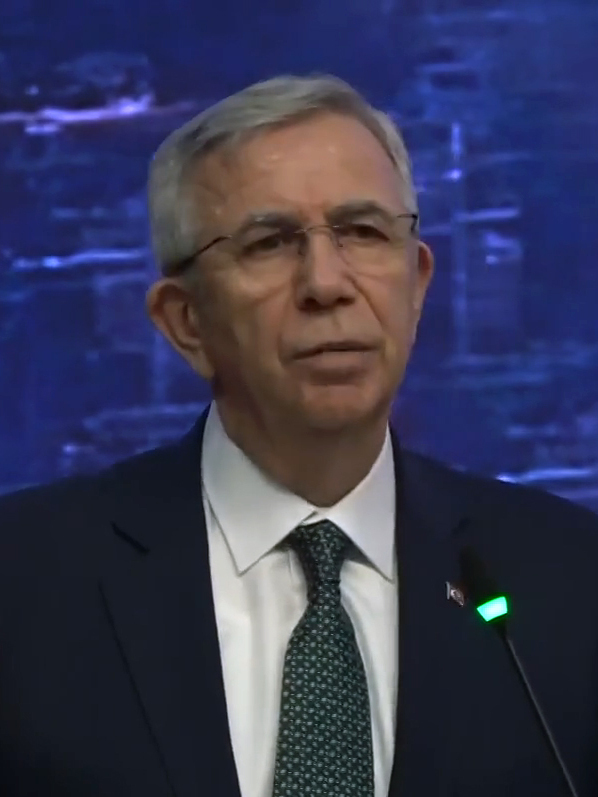
- Yavaş in 2025

29th Mayor of Ankara
- Incumbent
- Assumed office 8 April 2019
- Preceded by: Mustafa Tuna

Mayor of Beypazarı
- In office 18 April 1999 – 29 March 2009
- Preceded by: İbrahim Demirr
- Succeeded by: Mehmet Cengiz Özalp

Member of the Beypazarı Municipal Council
- In office 26 March 1989 – 27 March 1994
- Preceded by: Multi-member district
- Succeeded by: Multi-member district

Personal details
- Born: 23 May 1955 (age 71) Beypazarı, Turkey
- Party: Republican People's Party (2013–2016, 2018–2026)
- Other political affiliations: Nationalist Task Party (1989–1992); Nationalist Movement Party (1992–2013)
- Spouse: Nursen Yavaş (m. 1986)
- Children: 2
- Education: Istanbul University
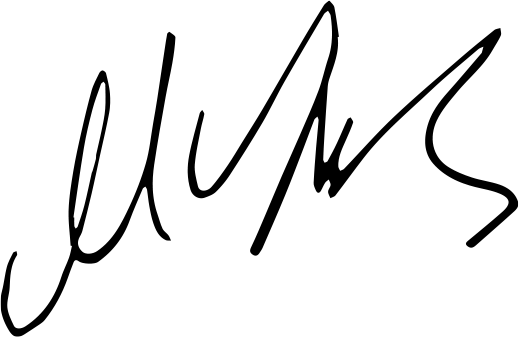
- Signature
- Website: www.mansuryavas.com.tr

Mansur Yavaş (Turkish pronunciation: [mɑnˈsuɾ jɑˈvɑʃ]; born 23 May 1955) is a Turkish lawyer and politician who is currently the Mayor of Ankara, holding the office since April 2019. He was elected in the 2019 Ankara mayoral election as the candidate of the Nation Alliance, an opposition alliance formed by the Republican People's Party (CHP) and the Good Party.

A lawyer by profession, Yavaş originally entered politics as a nationalist politician. He was the Nationalist Movement Party (MHP) Mayor of Beypazarı, a district of Ankara, in the 1999 Turkish local elections. He served until 2009 and left the MHP in 2013. He joined the CHP the same year and was the CHP's candidate for the 2014 Ankara mayoral local election, where official results claimed that he had lost by 1 percentage point. The elections were disputed and were even referred to the European Court of Human Rights due to alleged fraud and irregularities. Despite briefly leaving the CHP, Yavaş returned to politics before the 2019 Turkish local elections to stand again as the CHP's candidate, this time with support from the Good Party, which formed the Nation Alliance together with the CHP). He was elected with 50.9% of the vote.

Yavaş received praise for his handling of the COVID-19 pandemic in Ankara, where he announced that wages for municipal workers would continue being paid and that street cats and dogs would continue to be fed despite the closure of restaurants and cafes. He has also been credited with substantially reducing the municipality's budget deficit by eradicating spending seen as wasteful.

According to Piar Araştırma, Yavaş had a satisfaction rating of 73.2% in 2020, greater than Istanbul mayor Ekrem İmamoğlu or President Recep Tayyip Erdoğan, and the highest of mayors polled. Yavaş holds the highest approval rating of any Turkish politician at 61%. He won the 2021 World Mayor Capital Award.

He was re-elected with a wide margin of victory in the 2024 mayoral election. Due to his popularity, he is seen as a potential presidential contender for the next Turkish presidential election.

== Early life and education ==
Yavaş was born in the town of Beypazarı, a district of the Ankara Province of Turkey. His father was a former carpenter who ran a business as a newspaper vendor for which Yavaş worked as a paperboy. He completed his primary and secondary education in Beypazarı and started attending Istanbul University in 1979, graduating with a degree in law in 1983. After completing his mandatory military service as a military prosecutor, Yavaş returned to Beypazarı and began practicing law as a private attorney.

== Early political career ==
Yavaş was elected a member of the municipal council of Beypazarı in 1989. He ran unsuccessfully for the office of the mayor of Beypazarı in 1994. Yavaş continued his legal practice and council membership until 18 April 1999, when he ran again and was elected mayor with 51% of the vote.

=== 2014 Turkish local elections ===
Yavaş was the Republican People's Party's candidate for mayor in Ankara for the Turkish local elections held on 30 March 2014. At 20:30 local time on the day of the election, after voting had ended and the count was underway, he held a press conference declaring victory and urging his supporters to remain at voting stations to monitor the count despite very unfavorable preliminary result information from the Anadolu News Agency. On 1 April 2014, Yavaş held a press conference where he accused the government-owned Anadolu News Agency of deliberately delaying the broadcast of vote counts from areas with strong support for the Republican People's Party in order to discourage volunteers from continuing to monitor the count. Yavaş stated that his campaign had filed objections with the local election authorities regarding numerous irregularities and urged his supporters, who had gathered in front of the Supreme Electoral Council, to stay calm.

=== 2019 Turkish local elections ===
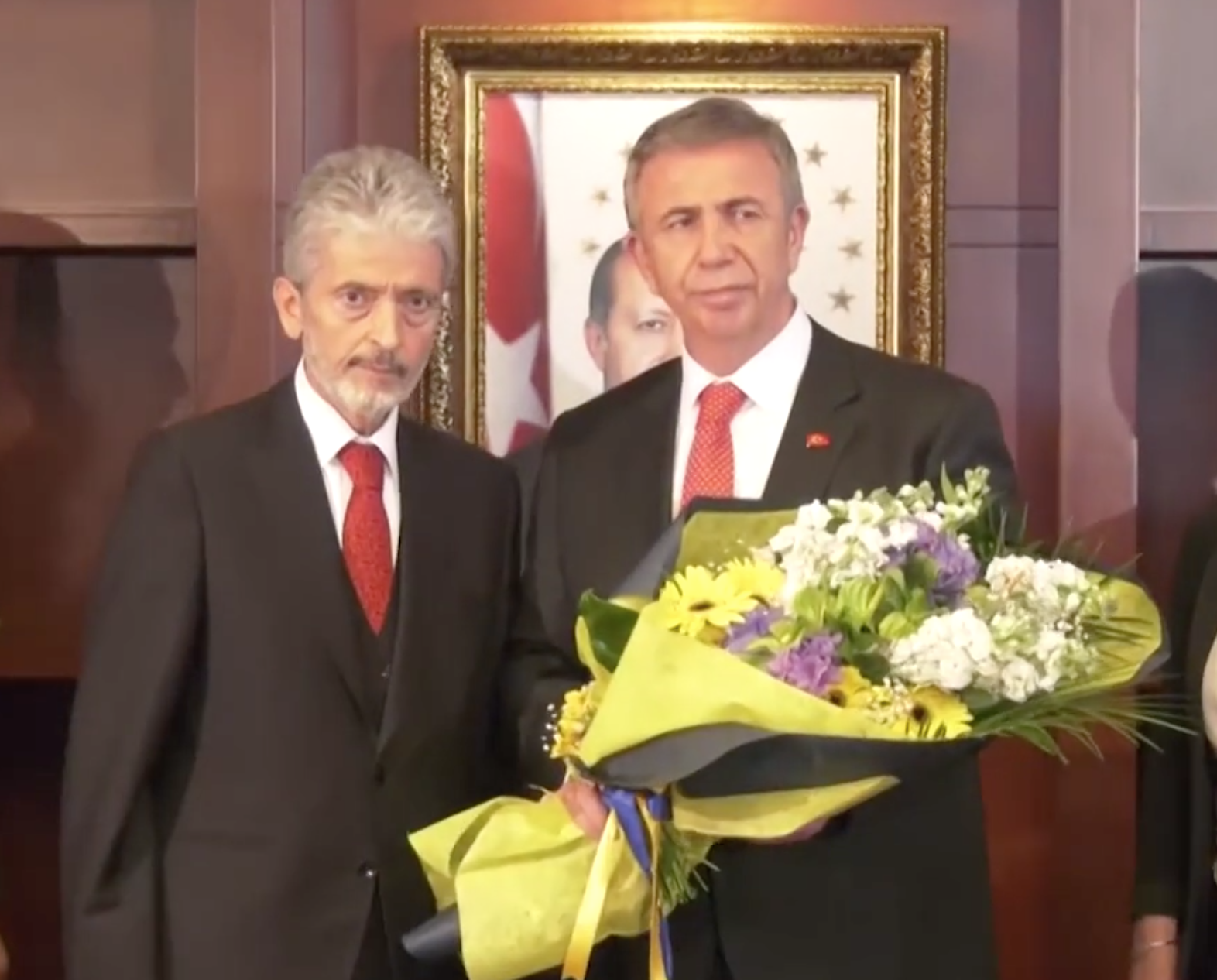
Mansur Yavaş taking over as Mayor of Ankara from outgoing mayor Mustafa Tuna during an official handover ceremony on 8 April 2019

Despite having previously resigned from the CHP over their inability to overturn the irregularities of the previous election in 2014, Yavaş announced his intention to rejoin the party and stand again as their candidate for Mayor of Ankara. He was subsequently declared the CHP's candidate, with backing from the Good Party, thereby making him the joint candidate of the Nation Alliance. Yavaş started his campaign with a strong lead over his People's Alliance rival, Mehmet Özhaseki.

During the campaign, Yavaş was accused of fraud, forgery and blackmail over duplicate court cases that were filed in 2009. The claims were brought by his rival's Justice and Development Party (AKP), with Yavaş claiming that the individual who had made the claims had a variety of criminal convictions and ongoing investigations over child abuse. While his opponents questioned his legitimacy in light of the claims, his supporters saw the claims to be politically motivated and baseless.

In the election on 31 March, Yavaş became the first CHP Mayor of Ankara after 25 years of AKP (and its predecessor Virtue Party) rule, taking 50.9% of the vote compared to his rival's 47.1%. He assumed office on 8 April 2019, after a recount of several ballots failed to close the gap between him and Özhaseki.

== Mayor of Ankara ==
Yavaş started his mayoral term by placing a freeze on the hiring of municipal personnel while investigations over corruption under the previous Justice and Development Party (AKP) continue. He also replaced two high-ranking municipal civil servants. He was also praised for ordering the statue of Mustafa Kemal Atatürk in Ankara's Ulus district to be thoroughly cleaned, having been subject to years of negligence under previous mayors.

On 13 April 2019, the AKP-controlled Ankara Municipal Council attempted to withdraw certain powers from the Mayor and delegate them to the council. Yavaş stated that the attempted power-grab was unlawful and went against the council's bylaws, using his executive power to reject the proposed changes. Yavaş also criticised the previous AKP council's preference to outsource municipal contracts to loss-making companies due to political preferences.

Due to his work, he has received fame across Turkey. Polls conducted within the country in late 2020 showed that Yavaş would win if he faced Erdoğan in a potential presidential election.

Yavaş is widely praised for his effective and rapid "100-day plan" which saw news coverage in the whole of Turkey. Mansur Yavaş ended the system of family or friends taking power, which was a practice used by the AKP. Yavaş believed Ankara was debt-ridden because of incompetent politicians who were put into power for their affiliations to the AKP rather than merit. Mansur Yavaş began a national charity project which would give bread to poor people in Turkey during the COVID-19 pandemic, but this was stopped by President Erdogan and AKP supporters attempted to hack the project. Mansur Yavaş made transportation in the metropolitan area of Ankara free during national and religious holidays. More famously, Yavaş got rid of the luxury SUVs and cars that were purchased for the Ankara office by Melih Gökçek. Instead, Mansur Yavaş had these SUVs offered to couples getting married in Ankara for a day for free. In terms of transportation and infrastructure, Yavaş has criticised the AKP for "neglecting" the issue for "many years," and has since contacted various firms to construct and preserve bicycle routes and pedestrian pavements to encourage Ankara citizens to decrease fossil fuel emissions. Yavaş has invested into a trade fair in Ankara to rival Canton, the world's largest trade fair held in China, which would allow Ankara to host the world's largest trade fair. The condition of establishing solar energy and rainwater storage areas in new houses in the capital was imposed. A 50 per cent discount on the water was made in student houses. Since home projects required solar panels on them.

Mansur Yavaş was praised for attending the victims of the 2020 Aegean Sea earthquake while President Erdogan went to Van instead to attend a party conference.

In late 2020, Yavaş announced he would establish free internet in 928 villages in the Ankara province within 45 days.

In 2025, Yavaş officiated at a ceremony unveiling a memorial "to keep alive the memory of Talaat Pasha".

=== 2023 Presidential elections ===
According to polls, he was the strongest candidate to run against Recep Tayyip Erdoğan in the 2023 Turkish presidential election, with a lead as high as 28% in the second round; with this lead, his chances of beating Erdoğan are on par with the other possible joint opposition candidate Istanbul Mayor Ekrem İmamoğlu. On 6 March 2023, leader of Republican People's Party, Kemal Kılıçdaroğlu declared his candidacy. Mansur Yavaş, Ekrem İmamoğlu and the leaders of five parties in the Nation Alliance were named as vice-president candidates.

== Political positions ==
On multiple occasions Yavaş defended the rights of Turkish opposition politicians who were arrested and called them to be tried without detention saying “If they are acquitted tomorrow, the rights of the elected mayors, as well as the rights of the citizens who elected them, are left hanging in the air.”

After the ratification of the Memorandum of Understanding on the delimitation of maritime jurisdiction areas between Turkey and Libya in 2026, Yavaş critisized EU Commission President Ursula von der Leyen's remarks on the agreement saying "EU leaders, in their statements, refrain from assessing the agreement on the delimitation of maritime jurisdiction areas between Turkey and Libya from a legal perspective; instead, they act with a reflex to protect the theses of Greece and the Greek Cypriot Administration of Southern Cyprus, which are member states of the European Union." and "International law is not a system of privileges that protects only the rights of European Union members, and Turkey and Libya, as sovereign states, possess the will to make decisions in accordance with their own rights and interests. If the rule of law is to be defended, the European Union administration and its member states must abandon double standards."

== Personal life ==
Mansur Yavaş married Nursen Yavaş in 1986. They have two daughters, Armağan and Çağlayan.

== Electoral history ==
=== Local elections ===
Election	Party	Votes	%	Outcome	Map
March 1994 Beypazarı	Nationalist Movement Party	4,351	31.17%	2nd	—N/a
April 1999 Beypazarı	Nationalist Movement Party	8,437	51.12%	1st	—N/a
March 2004 Beypazarı	Nationalist Movement Party	10,320	54.8%	1st	—N/a
March 2009 Ankara	Nationalist Movement Party	667,305	27.3%	3rd	—N/a
March 2014 Ankara	Republican People's Party	1,416,770	43.82%	2nd	—N/a
March 2019 Ankara	Republican People's Party	1,662,209	50.93%	1st	
March 2024 Ankara	Republican People's Party	1,997,429	60.38%	1st	
