= Next Turkish presidential election =

Scheduled future election in Turkey

- By 7 May 2028
- Results by province
Incumbent President
Recep Tayyip Erdoğan
AK Party

The next Turkish presidential election is scheduled to be held no later than 14 May 2028, as part of the general election for that year. The first round will be held concurrently with the next parliamentary election.

The incumbent president, Recep Tayyip Erdoğan, is term-limited unless there is a snap election, but there is a speculation that the ruling People's Alliance may circumvent this provision by fielding a constitutional amendment.

== Background ==
=== 2023 elections ===
The previous Turkish general election took place on 14 May 2023, the second since a presidential system replaced the existing parliamentary one following a controversial 2017 referendum which narrowly approved amendments to the constitution. The 2023 election was mainly contested between incumbent president Recep Tayyip Erdoğan and the opposition Nation Alliance candidate Kemal Kılıçdaroğlu of the Republican People's Party (CHP). Both candidates earned 49.5% and 44.8% of the vote respectively in the first round, triggering a runoff on 28 May for the first time since direct elections for the presidency were instituted in 2014. Erdoğan went on to win with 52.18% of the vote.

In March 2024, Erdoğan said that he would step down from the presidency once his third term ends in 2028 and that he will retire from politics that same year.

== Electoral system ==
The President of Turkey is directly elected through the two-round system, under which a candidate must obtain a simple majority (more than 50%) of the popular vote to be elected. If no candidate secures an overall majority outright, then a runoff is held between the two most voted-for candidates from the first round, the winner of which is then declared elected. The first direct election to the Turkish presidency was held in 2014, after a referendum in 2007 abolished the previous system under which the head of state was elected by the legislature chamber, the Grand National Assembly of Turkey. The President of Turkey is subject to term limits, and may serve at most two five-year terms. If snap elections were held before the end of the second term, a third term would be permitted. Snap elections can be held either with the consent of 60% of the MPs in the Grand National Assembly of Turkey or ordered by presidential decree. Only snap elections via the consent of the Grand National Assembly during a president's second term can allow the president to serve a third term.

Prospective presidential candidates must be at least 40 years old and must have completed higher education. Any political party that has won 5% of the vote in the previous parliamentary election can put forward a candidate, although parties that have not met this threshold can form alliances and field joint candidates as long as their total vote share exceeds 5%. Independents can run if they collect 100,000 signatures from the electorate. Elections are overseen by the Supreme Election Council (YSK).

== Primaries ==
=== Republican People's Party ===
The main opposition, for the first time, determined its candidate through a partywide primary. It was officially acknowledged in January 2025.

Imamoglu was widely considered the top contender for the nomination of CHP, but his candidacy was put into doubt after the cancellation of his degree due to alleged irregularities by Istanbul University and his subsequent arrest on charges of corruption and aiding a terrorist group. Protests have broken out across Turkey in aftermath of the detention of Imamoglu.

The primary took place on 23 March 2025. At the evening CHP chairman Özgür Özel announced to participants of a demonstration in Istanbul that 1.6 million of the 1.7 million CHP members had voted for İmamoğlu, and the solidarity ballot for non-CHP members had 13,844,070 votes cast in favor of İmamoğlu, totaling to 15.5 million votes favoring İmamoğlu.

== Candidates ==
=== Declared ===
- Ekrem İmamoğlu – Mayor of Istanbul (2019–present; suspended)
- Fatih Erbakan – Chairman of the New Welfare Party (2018–present)
- Sinan Oğan – Member of the Grand National Assembly of Turkey (2011–2015) for Iğdır, presidential candidate in 2023 (Ancestral Alliance)
- Gültekin Uysal - Chairman of the Democrat Party
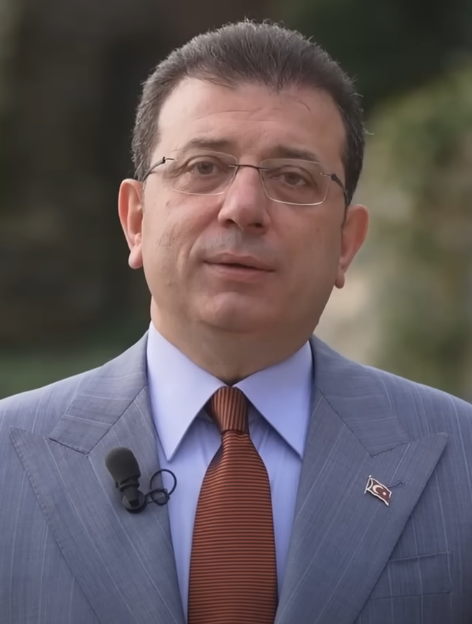
Mayor of Istanbul
Ekrem İmamoğlu

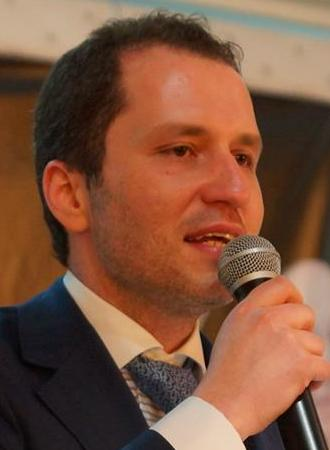
Chairman of the New Welfare Party
Fatih Erbakan

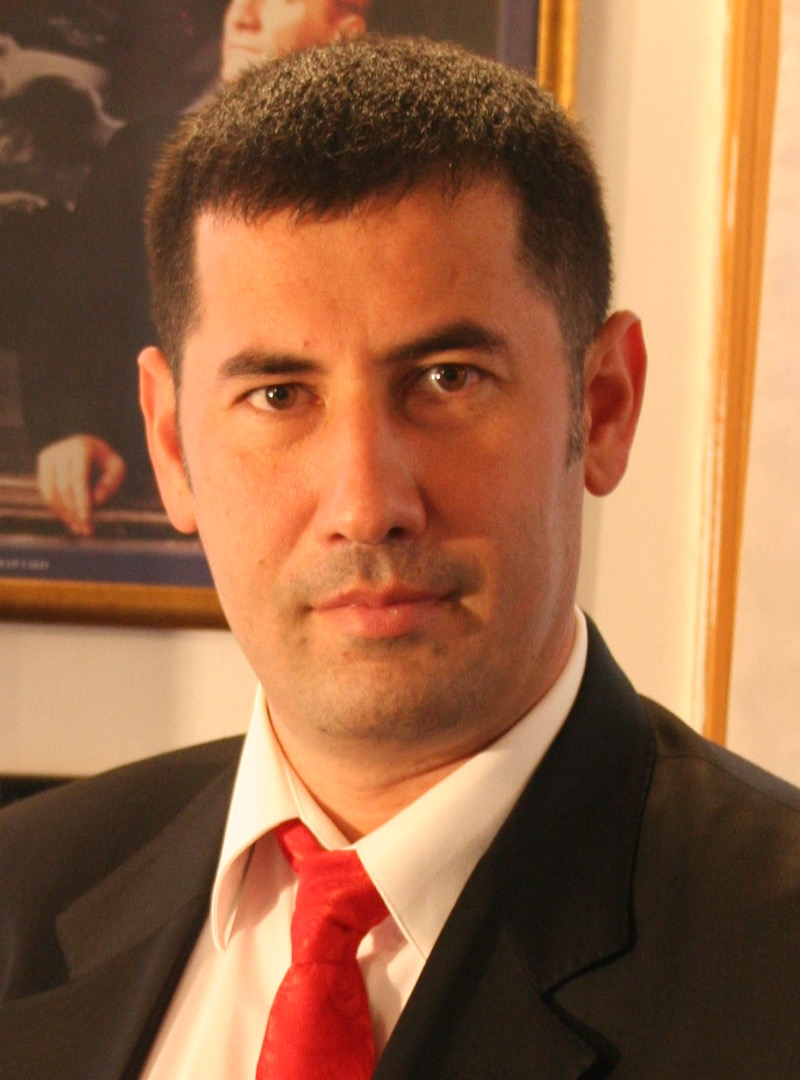
Former Member of the Grand National Assembly
Sinan Oğan

=== Publicly expressed interest ===
- Ali Babacan – Chairman of the Democracy and Progress Party (2020–present)
- Muharrem İnce – Member of the Grand National Assembly of Turkey for Yalova (2002–2018), presidential candidate in 2018 (Republican People's Party) and 2023 (Homeland Party) (Note: İnce withdrew from the race 3 days before the election, however his name remained on the ballot.)
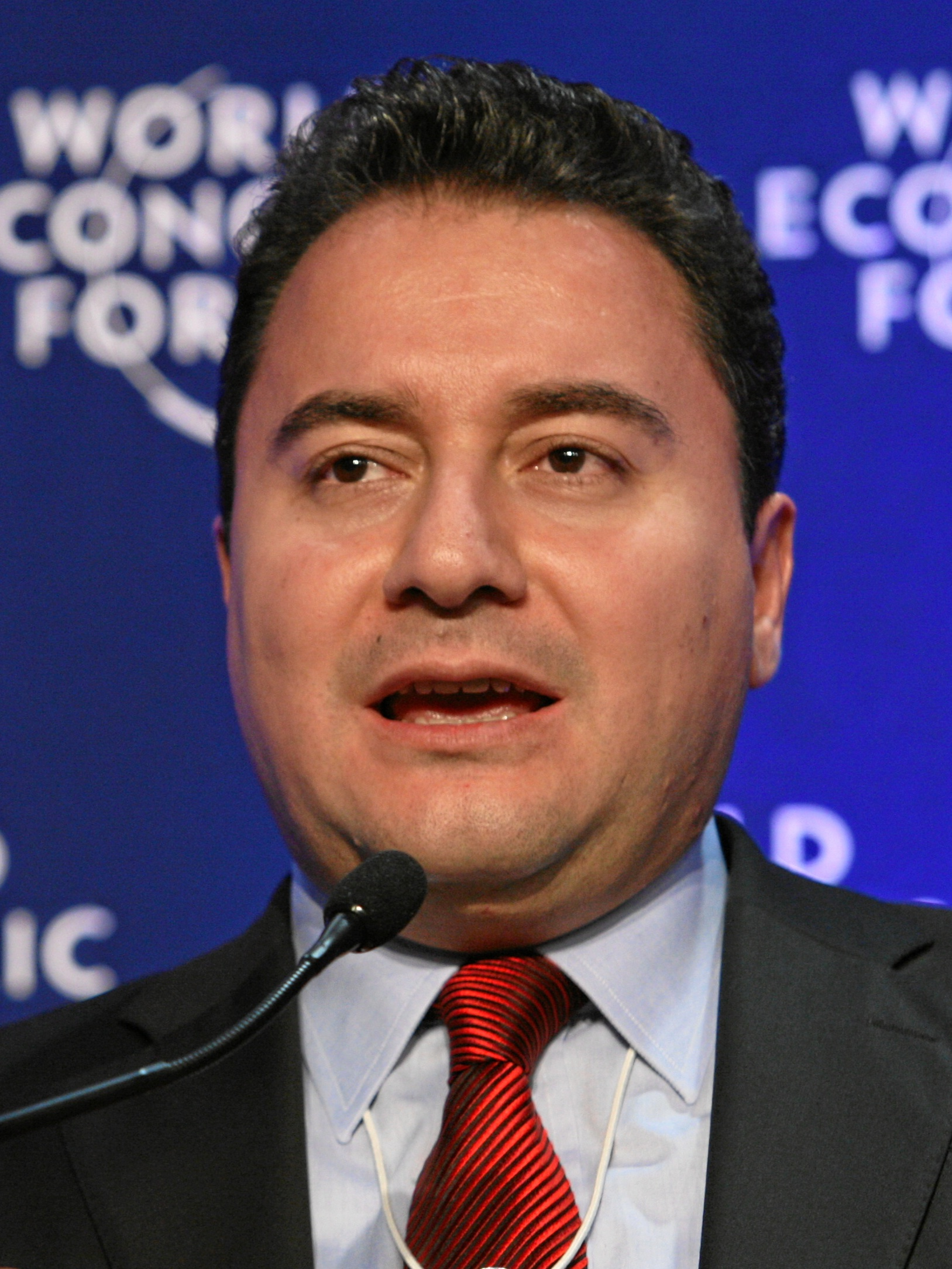
Chairman of the Democracy and Progress Party
Ali Babacan

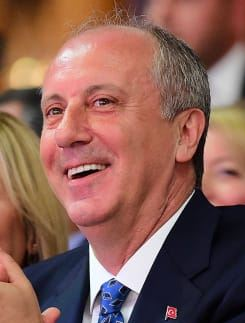
Former Member of the Grand National Assembly
Muharrem İnce

=== Potential ===
- Mansur Yavaş – Mayor of Ankara (2019–present)
- Kemal Kılıçdaroğlu – Runner up in 2023
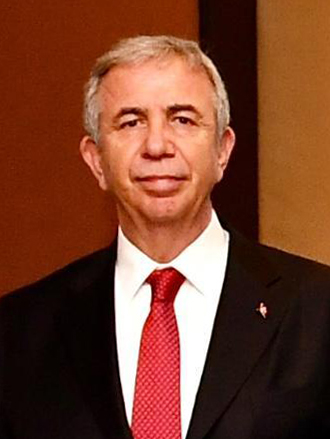
Mayor of Ankara
Mansur Yavaş

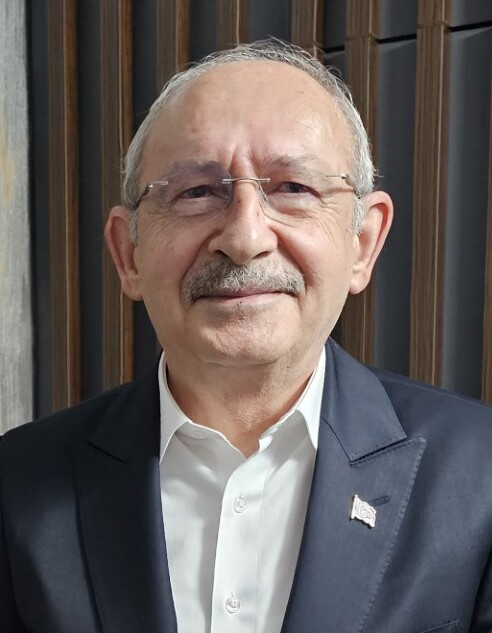
2023 runner-up
Kemal Kılıçdaroğlu

=== Declined ===
- Ahmet Davutoğlu – Prime Minister of Turkey (2014–2016) and chairman of the Future Party (2019–present)
- Özgür Özel – Leader of the Main Opposition and Chairman of the New Party (2026-present) and former Chairman of the Republican People's Party (2023–2026)
- Müsavat Dervişoğlu – Chairman of the Good Party (2024–present)
- Ümit Özdağ – Chairman of the Victory Party (2021–present)
- Bilal Erdoğan – Recep Tayyip Erdoğan's son, businessman

== Opinion polls ==
=== Graphical summary of the opinion polling ===
The graphical summary of the opinion polling as of November 3, 2025 is shown below. While each party is assigned a specific colour in the chart, the lighter tone (dots) indicate the results of the polling in the 2023 elections. The darker curve shows the avarage polling results of the last 30 days. The curves were plotted using locally estimated scatterplot smoothing (LOESS).

İmamoğlu, Yavaş and Özel, who are seen as potential candidates of the CHP, are taken together in and represented by the term "CHP".
