= Murat Kurum =

Turkish politician (born 1976)

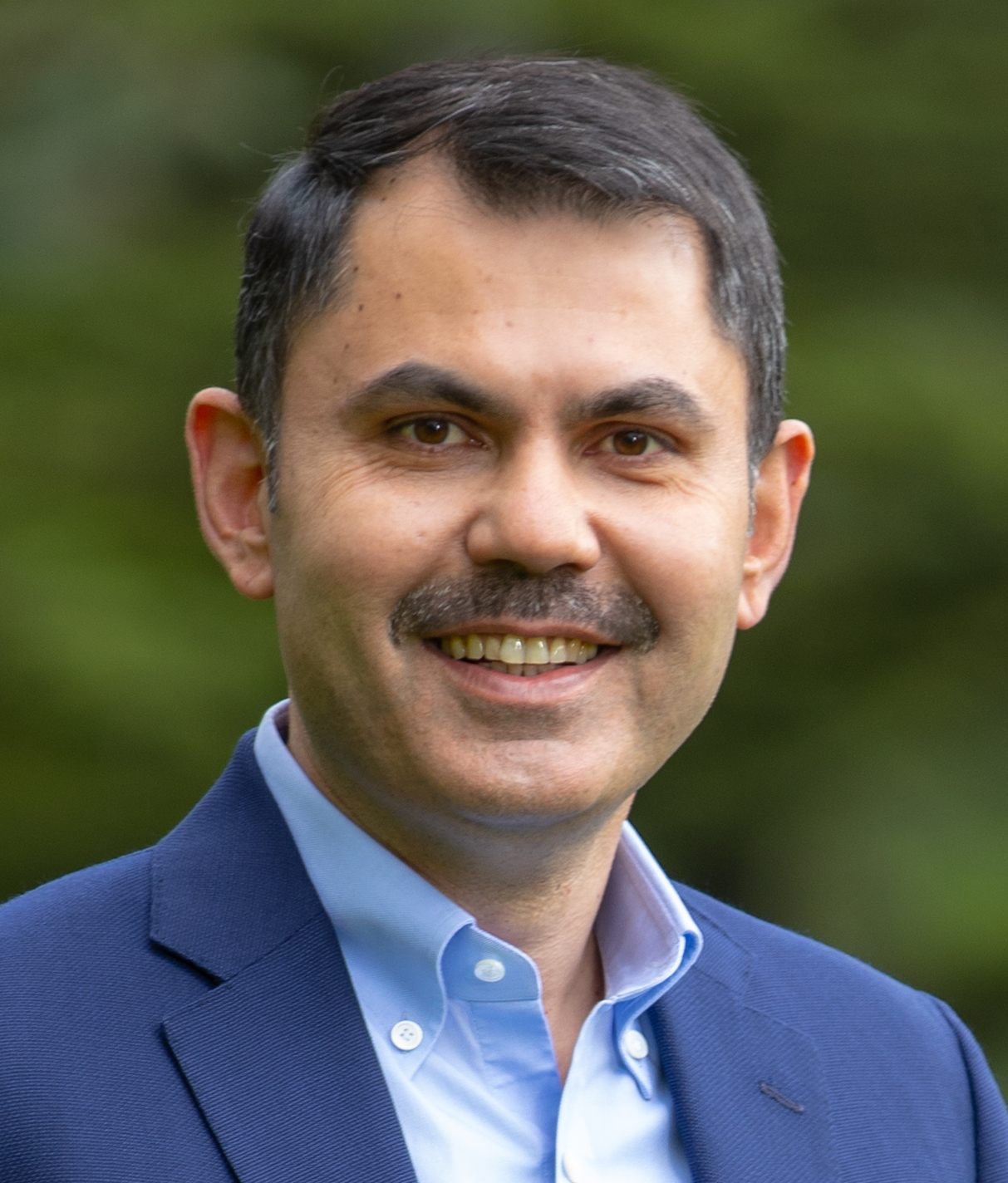
- Kurum in 2023

Minister of Environment, Urbanisation and Climate Change
- Incumbent
- Assumed office 2 July 2024
- President: Recep Tayyip Erdoğan
- Preceded by: Mehmet Özhaseki
- In office 10 July 2018 – 4 June 2023
- President: Recep Tayyip Erdoğan
- Preceded by: Mehmet Özhaseki
- Succeeded by: Mehmet Özhaseki

Member of the Grand National Assembly
- In office 7 June 2023 – 2 July 2024
- Constituency: Istanbul (I) (2023)

Personal details
- Born: 7 May 1976 (age 50) Çankaya, Ankara, Turkey
- Party: Justice and Development Party
- Spouse: Şengül Kurum (m. 2000)
- Children: 3
- Education: Selçuk University (BS); Okan University (MS)
- Occupation: Politician, engineer

Murat Kurum is the minister of Environment, Urbanization and Climate Change in Turkey, and president of the 2026 United Nations Climate Change Conference, COP31.

== Early life ==
Murat Kurum was born on May 7, 1976, in Çankaya, Ankara, to Mehmet Kurum of Karapınar, Konya and Satı Kurum of Belpınar, Kızılcahamam, Ankara. His father, Mehmet, was a civil servant at the Ministry of Public Works and Housing, the predecessor to the ministry where Murat would later be appointed to as the minister. His mother, Satı, was a housewife.

Murat Kurum briefly attended Atatürk Primary School in Mardin before moving back to Ankara to finish his primary education at Seyranbağları Primary School. He was then educated at Kocatepe Mimar Kemal High School in Ankara. Kurum later entered the Turkish university entrance exam where he gained admission to a food engineering program. However, he retook the exam the following year to study construction engineering.

He graduated from Selçuk University in 1999 with an engineering degree in construction. Kurum later completed his master's degree with a thesis on urban transformation from Okan University in 2017.

== Career ==
Kurum at COP31 in Antalya

Between 1999 and 2005, he worked as an engineer, site manager and coordinator in various private organizations operating in the field of construction.

Between 2005 and 2006, he worked as an expert at the Mass Housing Development Administration Ankara Implementation Department. Between 2006 and 2009, he worked as the European Side Implementation Branch Manager of TOKİ Istanbul Implementation Department Emlak Konut GYO A.Ş., a subsidiary of TR Prime Ministry Mass Housing Administration, since 2009. He served as General Manager and member of the board of directors. He was appointed the Minister of Environment and Urbanization on July 10, 2018.

On January 7, 2024 it was announced that Kurum would be running for the position of Mayor of Istanbul. After losing the election he continued his duty as an MP until he was appointed the Minister of Environment and Urbanizaton for the second time on July 2, 2024.

On December 26, 2025 Turkish President Recep Tayyip Erdoğan appointed Kurum as President of the UN climate change conference, COP31, to be held in Antalya, Turkey from November 9–20, 2026. As president, he managed the COP preparations, official communications, and the COP31 Action Agenda.

== Personal life ==
Kurum is married and has three children.

Political offices
Preceded by Mehmet Özhaseki	Minister of Environment, Urbanisation and Climate Change; 10 July 2018 – 4 June 2023	Succeeded by Mehmet Özhaseki
