= 2026 United Nations Climate Change Conference =

31st UN climate conference

- Part of United Nations Climate Change Conference
- 2026 United Nations Climate Change Conference
- Date: 9 November 2026 – present
- Venue: Antalya Expo Center
- Location: Antalya, Turkey
- Also known as: COP31
- Previous event: ← Belém 2025
- Next event: → Addis Ababa 2027
- Website: cop31.tr

The 2026 United Nations Climate Change Conference or Conference of the Parties to the UNFCCC, more commonly known as COP31, was held at the Expo Center in Antalya, Turkey. It was the 31st session of the United Nations Climate Change Conference, part of the United Nations Framework Convention on Climate Change (UNFCCC). Talks were scheduled to take place from 9 to 20 November 2026 but overran due to the failure to agree a deal.

On 22 November 2026, the United Nations said that the conference "collapsed" after two days of "overtime" negotiations. In the longest-running UN climate summit on record, negotiators did not work out a climate pact because of divisions over language relating to fossil fuels.

The EU Member States were “deeply disappointed” by the results, said Irish Environment Minister Darragh O'Brien, speaking on behalf of the EU Member States at the closing plenary session.

== Planning ==
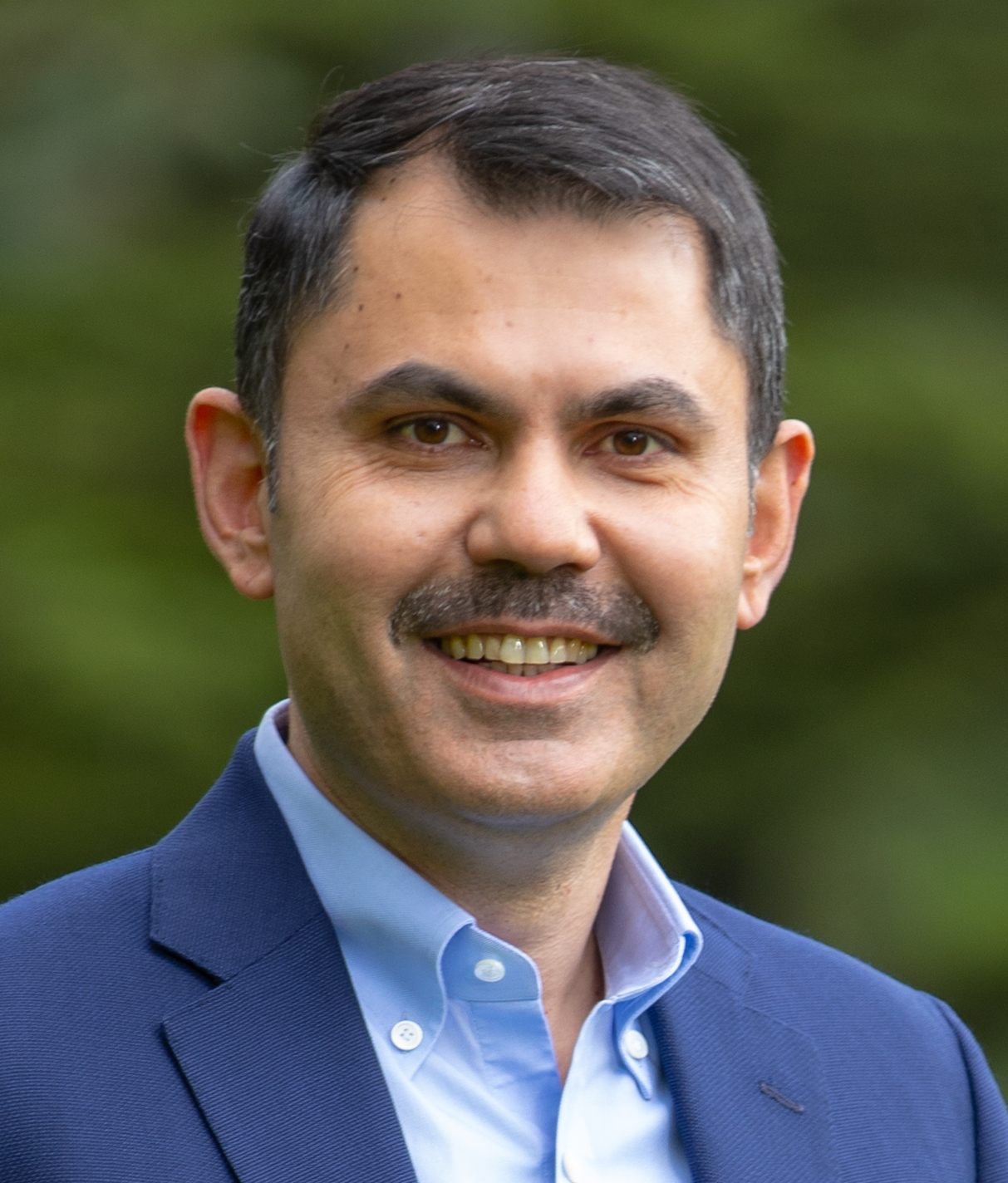
Murat Kurum, Turkey's Minister of Environment, Urbanization and Climate Change, the chair of COP31

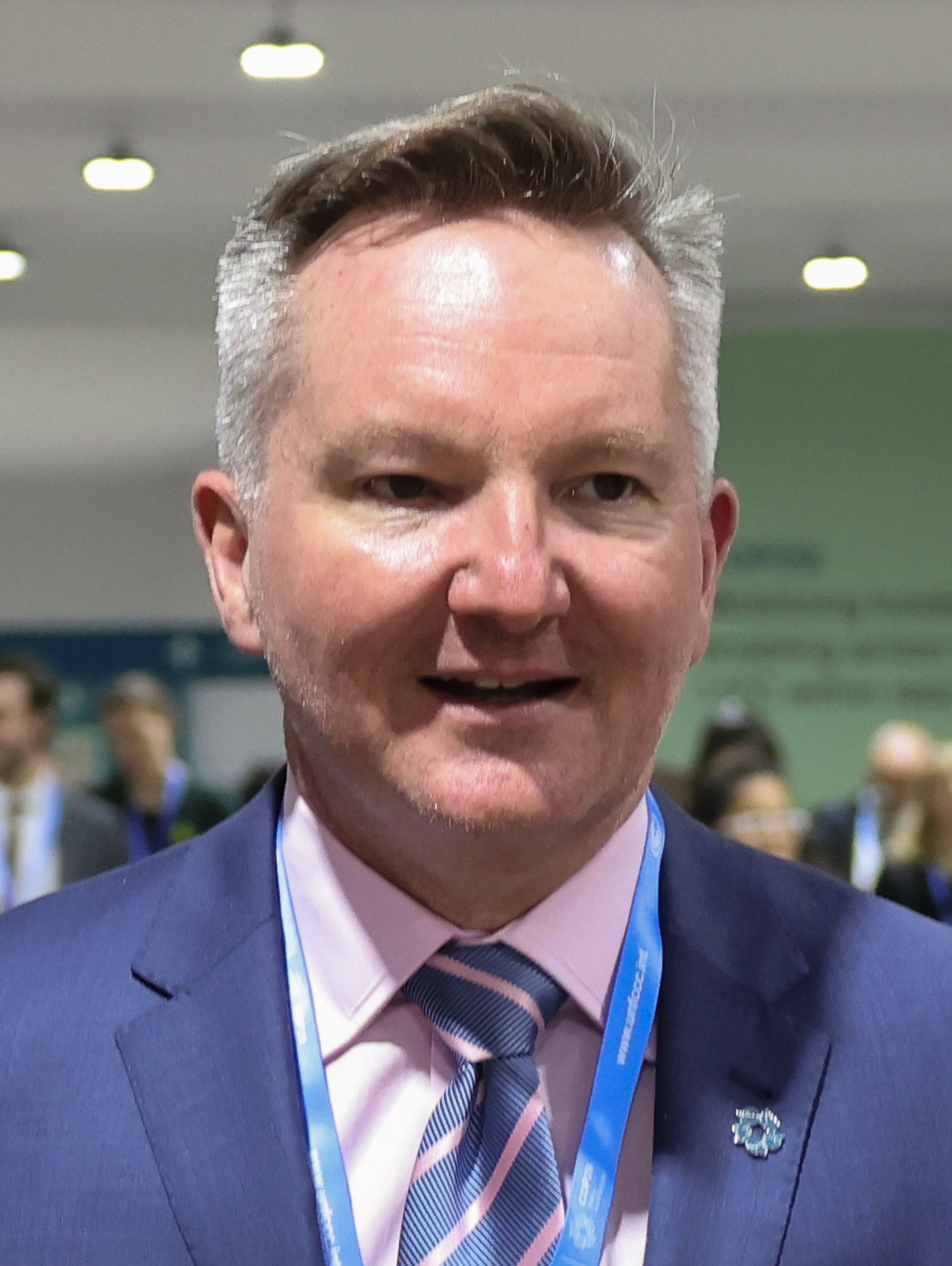
Chris Bowen, Australia's Minister for Climate Change and Energy preside over negotiations

Australia and Turkey had both made bids to host COP31. United Nations rules require a global consensus on a host country; if no agreement had been reached, it would have automatically been hosted in Bonn as the headquarters of the agency that oversees the Paris Agreement. Australia's Albanese government had prioritised hosting the conference, which it planned to host in Adelaide, and campaigned for its bid over three years. Representatives of both countries negotiated during COP30 as neither would withdraw their bid, although neither Recep Tayyip Erdoğan nor Anthony Albanese attended. After a week of negotiations in November 2025, Turkey and Australia compromised by allowing Turkey to host, while Australian Minister for Climate Change and Energy Chris Bowen would preside over negotiations.

== Organisation and key people ==
In advance of COP31 in Antalya, there was a pre-COP meeting in Fiji from 5–8 October including a leaders' event in Tuvalu to enable world leaders "to see Pacific climate destruction" in advance. During COP31, heads of states attended a World Leaders' Summit in Antalya on November 11 and 12. The summit took place on day three and four for the conference, in contrast to summits at previous COPs held on the first two days or immediately prior to the COP.

Murat Kurum, the Turkish Minister of Environment, Urbanization and Climate Change served as the COP President. Bowen was Vice-President and President of Negotiations. Although Australia chaired the formal negotiations Turkey was responsible for the Action Agenda. Turkey's Chief Climate Negotiator is Fatma Varank.

Samed Ağırbaş, President of the Zero Waste Foundation, served as Climate High-Level Champion for COP31. Working alongside the High-Level Champion for COP30, Ağırbaş' role focused on mobilizing ambitious climate action from businesses, financial institutions, cities, regions, civil society and communities to support governments in achieving the goals of the Paris Agreement.

== Non-government participation ==
Greenpeace said that coal subsidies in Turkey are a waste of money, greenhouse gas emissions by Turkey should be reduced, and called for a just transition to stop burning coal, strong adaptation policies and civil society participation. Academic İbrahim Özdemir has called for universities, civil society organizations, and climate activists to be given a "meeting and contribution platform". The location was agreed a year beforehand, but at that time the UNFCCC secretariat was saying that admitting organizations to observe these climate change conferences would take longer than that due to lack of resources. However some non-governmental organisations in Turkey, such as nature conservation organization Yolda and the Turkish Foundation for Combating Soil Erosion can nominate people to observe as they have been admitted to previous such conferences. NGOs such as Urgewald have criticized the Environment and Climate Change Ministry for supporting coal power, and the proposed expansion of the coal-fired Cenal power station. A commentator in The Times of India suggested that through "baklava diplomacy", the host country Turkey could strengthen sustainability through lived experience and leading by example.

== Opening statements ==
As COP31 opened, the head of the United Nations, António Guterres, urged the hosts and attendees to identify "clear next steps" to transition away from the use of fossil fuels; and to move on from simply discussing what to do and instead, focus on "organising it, financing it, and delivering it".

== Civil society and protests ==
Before the conference, civil society groups raised concern about the safety of participants after Turkish authorities launched a crackdown on LGBTQ+ organisations and activists in September 2026. On 14 November, thousands of people marched through Antalya in a demonstration organised by climate activists which AFP described as the largest protest since the conference began. Halime Saman of the People's Climate Summit platform, one of the groups behind the march, Turkey had no roadmap for phasing out fossil fuel. LGBTQ+ activists from Turkey took part, carrying rainbow flags and international civil society campaigners formed a protective ring around them.

== See also ==
- Climate change in Australia
- Climate change in Fiji
- Climate change in Turkey
- Climate change in Tuvalu
- Criticism of the 2026 United Nations Climate Change Conference
