= Criticism of the 2026 United Nations Climate Change Conference =

Criticism of the 2026 UN climate conference in Antalya

The 2026 United Nations Climate Change Conference (COP31), held in Antalya, Turkey, from 9 to 20 November 2026, was criticised by environmental organisations, climate activists, developing countries and society civilian groups. The main criticism concerns the contrast between the conference's aims and the fossil fuels policies of its host, the lack of agreement on language about fossil fuels, the level of climate finance for developing countries, restriction on civilian society in Turkey the effectiveness of the COP process itself and the conference's organisation.

== Hosts' fossil fuel policies ==
Critics directed some of their strongest objections at the two co-hosts, Turkey and Australia, for continuing to support fossil fuel industries while presiding over international climate negotiations. Human Rights Watch said that Turkey continued to support coal fired power generation and expansion projects. Australia remained a major coal exporter. Activists argued that neither country was showing the leadership needed to accelerate a transition away from fossil fuels. Le Monde similarly described the summit as being led by two coal dependent countries.

== Fossil fuel language in the draft agreement ==
The initial draft agreement was criticized for lacking a clear commitment to phase out fossil fuels. The Associated Press reported that Turkey's final draft did not mention the fossil fuels that cause global warming. According to The Guardian, about 130 countries reported supporting a reference to transitioning away from fossil fuel, while Saudi Arabia and other oil producing countries opposed stronger wording. Critics argued that the negotiations risked weakening commitments made at earlier climate conferences.

== Climate finance ==
Developing countries criticised the negotiations for not delivering sufficiently concrete financial commitments. Their concerns included insufficient funding for adaptation, inadequate support for countries suffering the consequence of climate change, reluctance among wealthy countries to provide promised assistance and the risk that voluntary political commitments would take precedence over binding financial obligations.

== Civil society and human rights ==
Turkey's role as host drew criticism over restrictions on civil society and environmental activists. Human Rights Watch raised concern about limits on freedom of expression, association and peaceful assembly in Turkey and questioned whether independent civil society organisations could take part safely. Environmental activists also questioned the inclusiveness of the conference.

== Effectiveness of the COP process ==
The conference also raised broader criticism on the COP process. Critics pointed to the consensus based decision making system, which allows a small number of countries to block stronger agreements, the size of the conferences and their environmental footprint, the presence and influence of fossil fuel lobbyists, the gap between declarations and implementation and the slow pace of negotiations relative to the urgency of climate change. Le Monde reported that some experts and civil society organisations were calling for fundamental reform of the process.

== Organisation and logistics ==
The Independent on 16 November 2026 that attendees had waited in some cases up to five hours to collect accreditation and that journeys between hotels and the venue reportedly took up to three hours. The draft agreement was also criticised as excessively long, unclear and lacking coherent directions.

== Reaction from campaign groups ==
On 20 November, members of Climate Action Network international, which represents more than 2,300 environmental and climate justice organisations, rejected the proposed agreement. Some campaigners describe the summit as the "worst COP in history" and argued that governments should reject the proposed outcome rather than accept an inadequate one.

== See also ==
- 2026 United Nations Climate Change Conference
- United Nations Climate Change Conference
