= 1999 Turkish local elections =

← 1994	April 18, 1999	2004 →

All 3,215 district municipalities and 16 metropolitan municipalities of Turkey
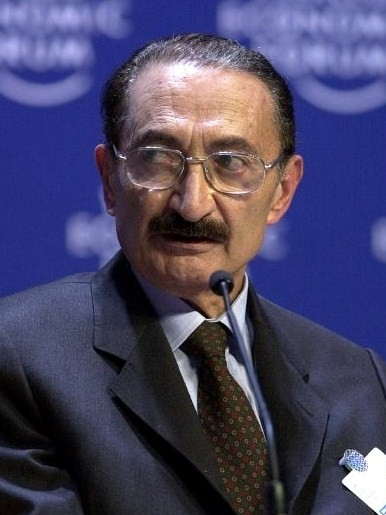

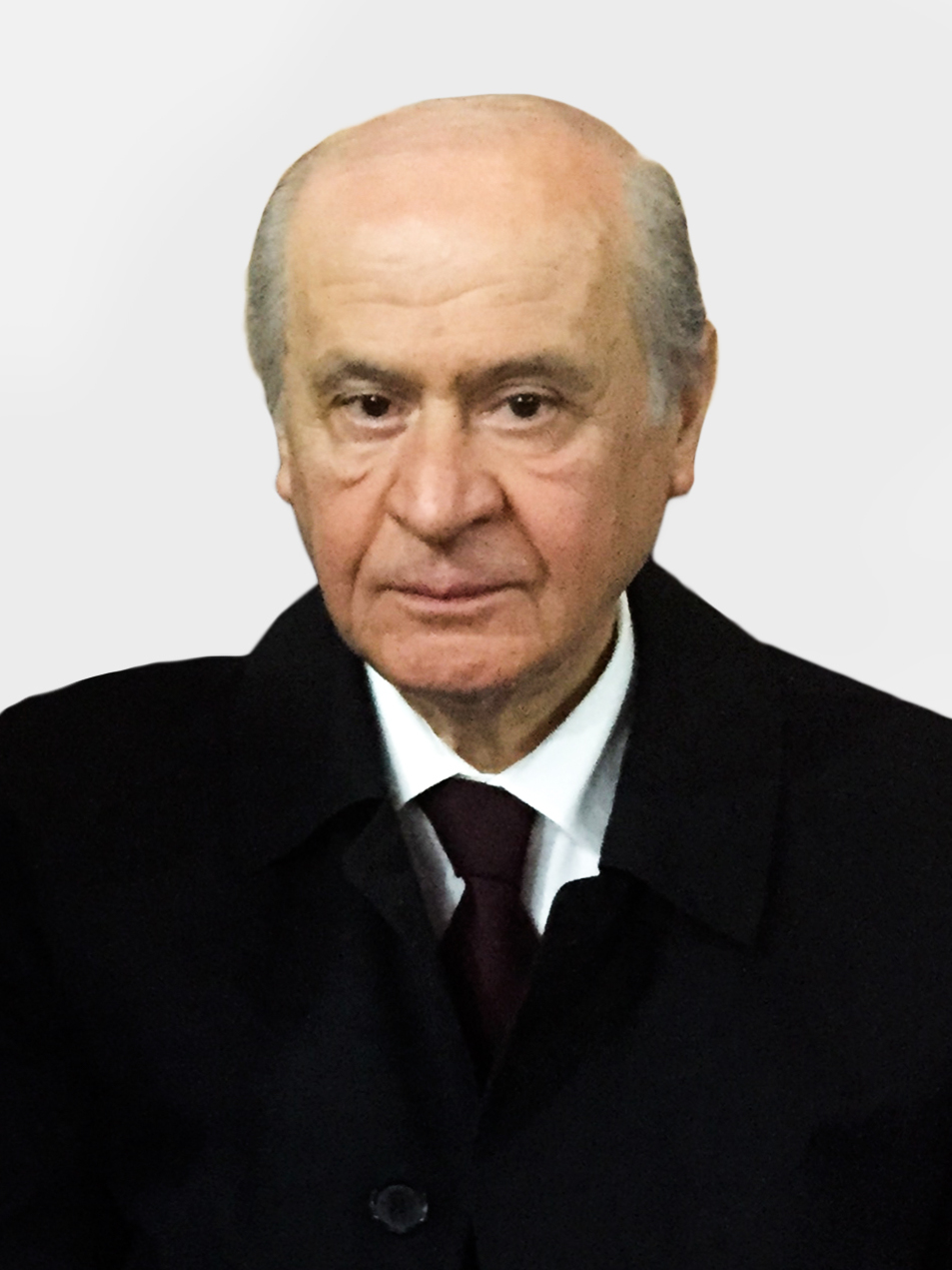

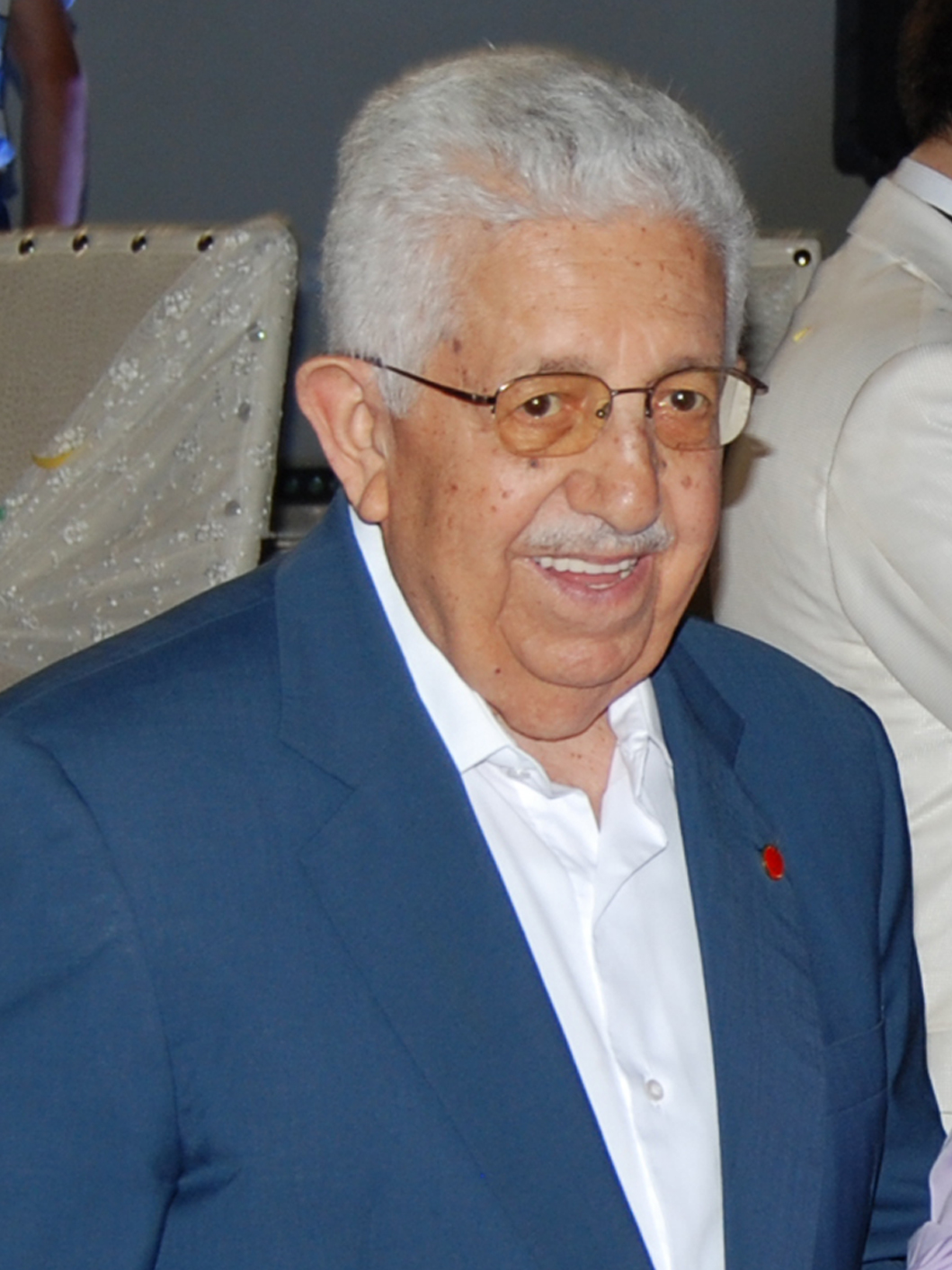
	Majority party	Minority party	Third party
Leader	Bülent Ecevit	Devlet Bahçeli	Recai Kutan
Party	DSP	MHP	FP
Leader since	15 January 1989	6 July 1997	1998
Last election	8.75%, 23 mayors	7.95%, 118 mayors	19.14%, 329 mayors
Municipalities	189	499	488
Mayor ±	▲166	▲381	▲159
Popular vote^	5,885,132	5,401,597	5,185,831
Percentage	18.70%	17.17%	16.48%
Swing	▲9.95pp	▲9.22pp	▼2.66pp
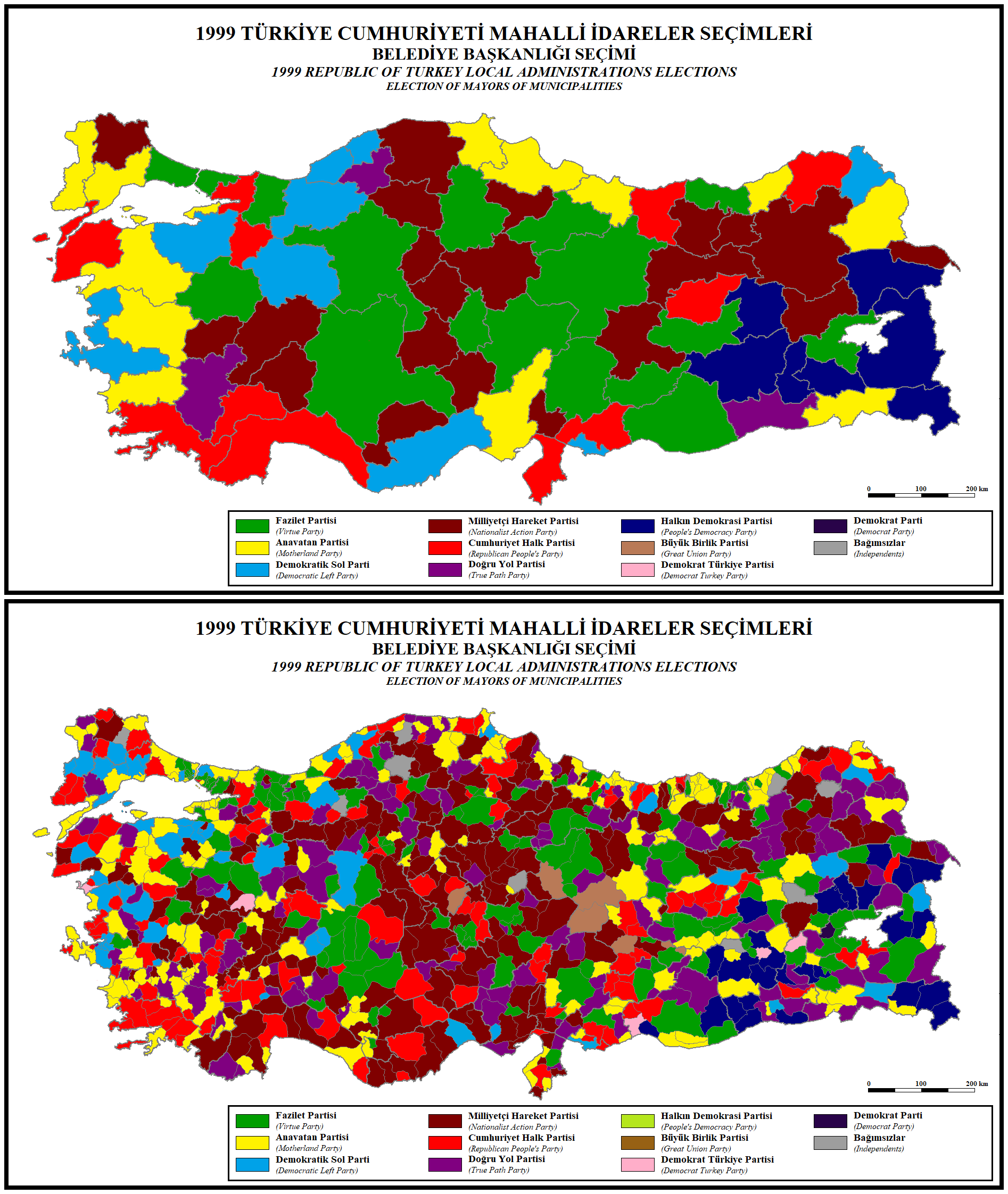

Local elections were held in Turkey on April 18, 1999, on the same day with the parliamentary election.

== Results ==
Party	Votes	%
Democratic Left Party	5,885,132	18.70
Nationalist Movement Party	5,401,597	17.17
Virtue Party	5,185,831	16.48
Motherland Party	4,730,711	15.03
True Path Party	4,157,262	13.21
Republican People's Party	3,487,483	11.08
People's Democracy Party	1,094,761	3.48
Great Unity Party	540,239	1.72
Democrat Turkey Party	292,224	0.93
Freedom and Solidarity Party	263,814	0.84
Nation Party	86,481	0.27
Peace Party	67,448	0.21
Workers' Party	66,175	0.21
Democratic Party	41,947	0.13
Liberal Democratic Party	30,314	0.10
Labour Party	29,499	0.09
Socialist Power Party	22,825	0.07
Rebirth Party	17,335	0.06
Democracy and Peace Party	6,593	0.02
Changing Turkey Party	3,143	0.01
Independents	56,879	0.18
Total	31,467,693	100.00

=== Metropolitan municipality mayors ===
City	Winner	Party
Adana	Aytaç Durak	Motherland Party
Ankara	Melih Gökçek	Virtue Party
Antalya	Bekir Kumbul	Republican People's Party
Bursa	Erdoğan Bilenser	Democratic Left Party
Diyarbakır	Feridun Çelik	People's Democracy Party
Erzurum	Mahmut Uykusuz	Nationalist Movement Party
Eskişehir	Yılmaz Büyükerşen	Democratic Left Party
Gaziantep	Celal Doğan	Republican People's Party
Istanbul	Ali Müfit Gürtuna	Virtue Party
İzmir	Ahmet Priştina	Democratic Left Party
Kayseri	Mehmet Özhaseki	Virtue Party
İzmit	Sefa Sirmen	Republican People's Party
Konya	Mustafa Özkafa	Virtue Party
Mersin	Macit Özcan	Democratic Left Party
Samsun	Yusuf Ziya Yılmaz	Motherland Party

=== Mayor of other municipalities ===
Province	Party
Adıyaman	FP
Afyonkarahisar	MHP
Ağrı	HADEP
Amasya	MHP
Aksaray	MHP
Ardahan	DSP
Artvin	CHP
Aydın	ANAP
Balıkesir	ANAP
Bartın	DSP
Batman	HADEP
Bayburt	MHP
Bilecik	CHP
Bingöl	HADEP
Bitlis	FP
Bolu	DSP
Burdur	CHP

Province	Party
Çanakkale	CHP
Çankırı	MHP
Çorum	FP
Denizli	DYP
Edirne	ANAP
Elazığ	FP
Erzincan	MHP
Giresun	CHP
Gümüşhane	MHP
Hakkâri	HADEP
Hatay	CHP
Iğdır	MHP
Isparta	MHP
Karabük	DYP
Karaman	MHP
Kars	ANAP

Province	Party
Kastamonu	MHP
Kilis	DSP
Kırıkkale	MHP
Kırklareli	MHP
Kırşehir	MHP
Kütahya	FP
Malatya	MHP
Manisa	ANAP
Kahramanmaraş	FP
Mardin	DYP
Muğla	CHP
Muş	MHP
Nevşehir	FP
Niğde	MHP
Ordu	ANAP
Osmaniye	MHP

Province	Party
Rize	ANAP
Sakarya	FP
Siirt	HADEP
Sinop	ANAP
Sivas	FP
Tekirdağ	ANAP
Tokat	FP
Trabzon	FP
Tunceli	CHP
Şanlıurfa	FP
Şırnak	ANAP
Uşak	MHP
Van	HADEP
Yozgat	MHP
Yalova	ANAP
Zonguldak	DSP
