= Mehmet Altınsoy =

Turkish politician (1924–2007)

- Born: 1924; Aksaray, Turkey
- Died: 17 February 2007 (aged 82–83); Ankara, Turkey
- Occupation: Politician

Mehmet Altınsoy (1924 – 17 February 2007) was a Turkish politician, who was a co-founder of the Motherland Party, and served as Mayor of Ankara and Minister of State.

== Biography ==
Mehmet Altınsoy became a lawyer after graduating from the Law School at Ankara University. He entered politics after the military coup of 1960. By keeping his nationalist-conservative line in the last 50 years of the history of Turkish politics, he was a member of several political parties like Nationalist Movement Party, Motherland Party and finally Welfare Party.

He was appointed a founding member of the parliament in 1961. He was appointed minister in the cabinet of Prime Minister Suat Hayri Ürgüplü in 1965. Mehmet Altınsoy served until 1969 in the parliament. In 1983, he was among the founders of Turgut Özal's Motherland Party. Between 1984 and 1989, he served as the mayor of Greater Ankara and realized major infrastructure projects with the support of Prime Minister Turgut Özal, whom Altınsoy was considered to be a confidant. He became a minister for the second time, in the Welfare Party and True Path Party coalition cabinet in 1996–1997.

After lying three days in a coma at the Atatürk Hospital in Ankara, where he was brought in following an intracranial hemorrhage caused by hypertension, he died on 17 February 2007. Mehmet Altınsoy was first married with Necla (1928–2001), the daughter of former President of Religious Affairs Ahmet Hamdi Akseki, with whom he had two daughters Yasemin and Sedef. He was buried at Karşıyaka Cemetery after the funeral service in Kocatepe Mosque.

Political offices
| Preceded by Süleyman Önder | Mayor of Ankara; 1984–1989 | Succeeded by Murat Karayalçın |
