= Halil Sezai Erkut =

Turkish politician

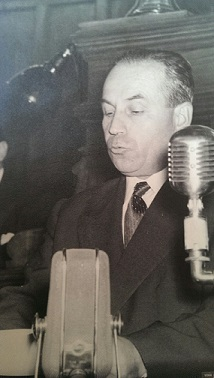

19th Mayor of Ankara
- In office November 17, 1963 – June 2, 1968
- Preceded by: Enver Kuray
- Succeeded by: Ekrem Barlas

Member of the Constituent Assembly of Turkey
- In office January 6, 1961 – October 25, 1961
- President: Cemal Gürsel

Personal details
- Born: 1908 Mucur, Angora vilayet, Ottoman Empire
- Died: 29 February 1988 (aged 79–80)
- Party: Republican People's Party

Halil Sezai Erkut (1908–1988) was a Turkish government minister and politician. He was a member of the Constituent Assembly of Turkey in 1961, immediately following the 1960 Turkish coup d'état. In 1963 he was elected mayor of Ankara; he served for one term until 1968.
