= Mustafa Tuna =

Turkish politician (born 1957)

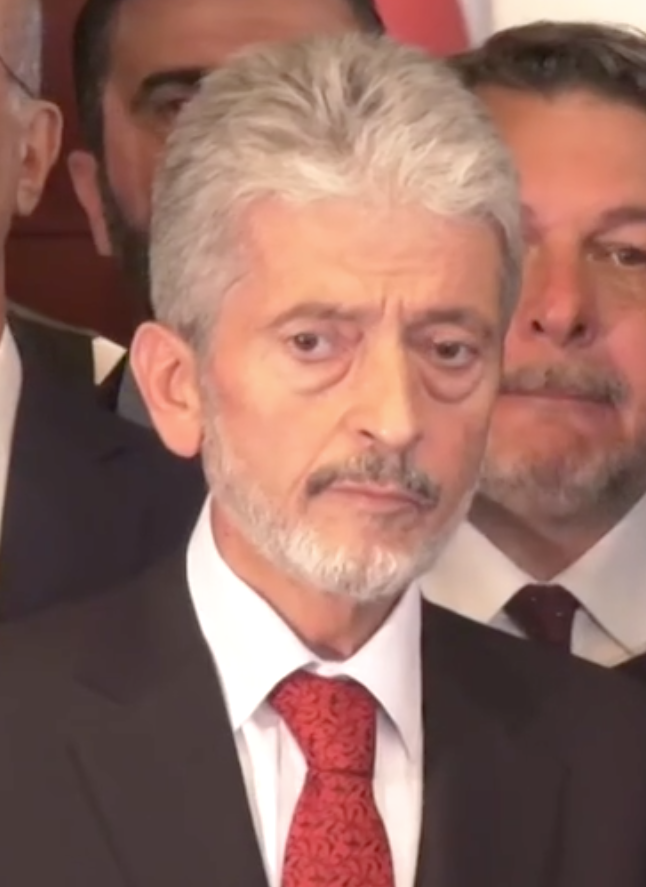
- Tuna in 2019

28th Mayor of Ankara
- In office 6 November 2017 – 8 April 2019
- Preceded by: Melih Gökçek
- Succeeded by: Mansur Yavaş

Mayor of Sincan
- In office 29 March 2009 – 6 November 2017
- Preceded by: Hasan Altın
- Succeeded by: Murat Ercan

Member of the Grand National Assembly (22nd Parliament)
- In office 14 November 2002 – 23 July 2007
- Constituency: Ankara (2002)

Personal details
- Born: 1957 (age 68–69) Şarkışla, Sivas Province, Turkey
- Party: Justice and Development Party (AKP)
- Spouse: Peykan Tuna (m. 1989)
- Education: Istanbul Technical University
- Occupation: Politician
- Profession: Environmental engineer

Mustafa Tuna (born 1957) is a Turkish engineer, academic, and politician, who served as the 28th mayor of Ankara between November 2017 and April 2019.

== Early years ==
Mustafa Tuna was born in Şarkışla, Sivas Province, Turkey, in 1957. He attended Istanbul Technical University (İTÜ), graduating with a bachelor's degree in civil engineering in 1980 and a master's degree in environmental engineering in 1982. Between 1982 and 1983, he received training in the United States.

== Academic career ==
In 1995, he received a doctoral degree from the Faculty of Science at the İTÜ upon his thesis "Cost Index of Wastewater treatment Facilities and Discharge-Cost Relations". Tuna was endowed with the title "Associate Professor" of the scientific discipline "Water Pollution and Its Control" by the interuniversity board in 1998. In parallel with his practical works in the industry, he carried on his academic studies in environmental technology, infrastructure planning and engineering economics. He has a number of scientific publications, both in Turkey and internationally. He received a promotional publication award from the Scientific and Technological Research Council of Turkey (TÜBİTAK) for his international papers. He was designated jury member for postgraduate thesis in his discipline. Tuna took part in many scientific workshops, conferences, symposiums and meetings in and outside the country.

Tuna served as the founding chairman of the "İTÜ Alumni Education Foundation". He is a member of the Chamber of Civil Engineers and Turkish representative at the International Association on Water Pollution Research and Control.

== Politics ==
Tuna entered politics, and was elected deputy of Ankara Province from the Justice and Development Party (AKP) in the 2002 general election. He was a member of the 22nd parliament until 2007. During this period, he served as Turkey's member of the parliamentary assembly of the Organization for Security and Co-operation in Europe.

He was elected mayor of the Sincan district in Ankara in the 2009 local elections held on 29 March. He was re-elected to the same post in the 2014 local elections.

On 6 November 2017, Tuna was elected Mayor of Ankara by the municipal council of Greater Ankara in the place of Melih Gökçek, who was forced to resign after serving in this position for almost 24 years.

Political offices
Preceded by Melih Gökçek	Mayor of Ankara; 6 November 2017–8 April 2019	Succeeded by Mansur Yavaş
