= 2014 Ankara mayoral election =

Local election in Turkey

- 30 March 2014
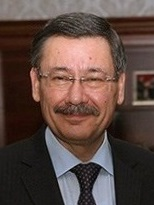

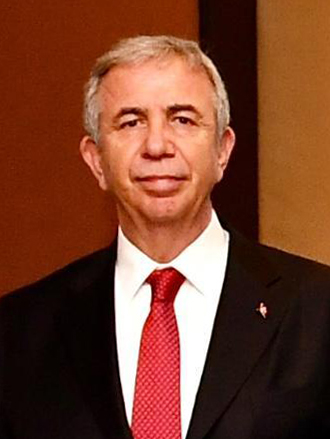
Candidate	İbrahim Melih Gökçek	Mansur Yavaş
Party	AK Party	CHP
Popular vote	1,416,770	1,385,038
Percentage	44.82%	43.82%
Mayor before election
Melih Gökçek
AK Party
Elected mayor
Melih Gökçek
AK Party

Mayoral elections were held in the Turkish province of Ankara as part of nationwide local elections on 30 March 2014. A total of 26 mayors, one for each of the 25 districts of Ankara and one for the Ankara Metropolitan Municipality, were elected.

The election of Ankara's Metropolitan Mayor was highly controversial, with several allegations of electoral fraud overshadowing the counting process and causing numerous requests for recounts by the opposition Republican People's Party, whose candidate Mansur Yavaş was initially on course to win the election. Finishing just one percentage point behind his rival Melih Gökçek and with evidence of ballot box miscalculations, Yavaş has since taken numerous allegations of misconduct to the European Court of Human Rights. Despite Gökçek's election being upheld by the Supreme Electoral Council of Turkey, most commentators and journalists believe that Yavaş was the actual winner of the election.

== Background ==
The election for the Ankara Metropolitan Mayor was one of the most fiercely contested in the election, with pre-election polls showing the incumbent Melih Gökçek from the AK Party neck and neck with the Republican People's Party (CHP) candidate Mansur Yavaş. First elected in 1994, Melih Gökçek was seeking his fourth term as Mayor of Ankara, while Yavaş was also expected to win strong support from the MHP.

== Electoral fraud ==
The strategic importance of Ankara as Turkey's capital city caused concerns over whether the vote would proceed fairly, with both Gökçek and Yavaş criticising each other for planning irregularities before the vote.

=== Counting process ===
The counting process in Ankara was widely seen as the most fraudulent in the country, with accusations of vote theft and burning, the intentional miscalculation of results from ballot boxes and even an armed intervention by unidentified gunmen in a vote counting centre within the pro-CHP district of Çankaya causing large-scale pro-democracy protests the day following the election. Opposition politicians also questioned the sudden stop in the release of results at a point where Yavaş was leading the race, only to resume hours later showing a sudden lead for Gökçek. The counting process, which took significantly longer than usual, ended with Gökçek apparently claiming a narrow lead of 31,732 votes (1%) over Yavaş, a result that was rejected by the CHP. Both candidates had initially declared victory and claimed that they would hold victory speeches early on in the evening.

=== Aftermath ===
The CHP began a large-scale ballot-checking operation, fielding requests for recounts to the Supreme Electoral Council of Turkey (YSK) while hundreds of volunteers analysed ballot box data to uncover any irregularities in recording the numbers of votes won by each candidate. The CHP claimed that they had uncovered attempts in large numbers of ballot boxes to record the votes incorrectly, with some ballot boxes apparently recording the CHP's votes at nearly zero while others recorded an unexplainably large vote count for the AKP. It was later announced that the CHP had uncovered enough irregularities in the ballot box records to alter the final result and give Yavaş a victory in the election. Regardless, the YSK refused the CHP's requests for a recount and declared the election result as final, sparking large pro-democracy protests outside the YSK headquarters.

=== Legal challenges ===
Mansur Yavaş declared his intention to challenge the YSK's decision to uphold the result at the Constitutional Court, with the intention to even consult the European Court of Human Rights (ECHR) should the Constitutional Court reject his case. Nevertheless, the Constitutional Court rejected Yavaş's legal claims on 23 July 2014, claiming that it did not have the authority to rule on election results. The Court also stated that the ECHR could only rule on individual human rights cases and challenging election results would not be within its remit either. Nevertheless, Yavaş filed a case to the ECHR in April 2015.

== Results ==
Local Elections 2014: Ankara Mayor
Party	Candidate	Votes	%	±%
AK Party	İbrahim Melih Gökçek	1,416,770	44.8	▲6.3
CHP	Mansur Yavaş	1,385,038	43.8	▲12.5
MHP	Mevlüt Karakaya	245,611	7.8	▼19.6
Büyük Birlik	Remzi Çayır	41,867	1.3	▲1.3
HDP	Salman Kaya	27,522	0.9	▲0.9
SAADET	Mehmet Ziyattin Tokar	15,214	0.5	▼0.7
YP	Tülin Erkan	5,009	0.2	▲0.2
HEPAR	Ahmet Nuri Çoker	4,199	0.1	▲0.1
BTP	Ata Selçuk	3,325	0.1	▼0.2
DP	Ömer Şenöz	3,300	0.1	▼0.2
Independent	Özcan Kaya Güvenç	2,527	0.1	▲0.1
DSP	Uğur Gürel	1,898	0.1	▲0.1
HAK-PAR	Ayşe Çelik	1,829	0.1	▲0.1
HKP	Fatma Serap Kardaşoğlu	1,652	0.1	▲0.1
DYP	Bekir Cebeci	1,266	0.0	▲0.1
TURK Party	Mevlüt Tanır	1,126	0.0	▲0.0
MP	Hacı Ali Özdemir	954	0.0	▼0.1
LDP	Refik Sarıkaya	405	0.0	▼0.1
Independent	Belgin Saydan	320	0.0	▲0.0
Independent	Fatih Rüştü Demirbağ	307	0.0	▲0.0
Independent	Melek Altıntaş	192	0.0	▲0.0
Independent	Tezer Ergezen	169	0.0	▲0.0
Independent	Oral Çevik	140	0.0	▲0.0
Independent	Özgür Baytek	126	0.0	▲0.0
Independent	Doğukan Erdoğan	55	0.0	▲0.0
Majority		31,732	1.0	▼6.2
Turnout		3,160,821	91.1	▲5.2
AK Party hold		Swing	-3.1	
