= 2024 Ankara mayoral election =

2024 Ankara mayoral elections
← 2019	31 March 2024; Part of the 2024 Turkish local elections	2029 →
- Metropolitan Municipality
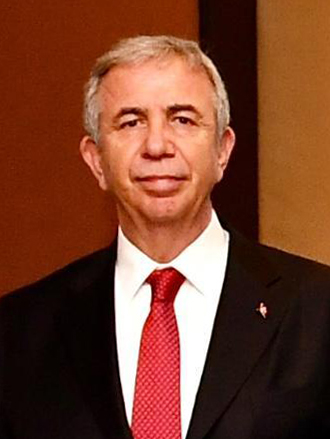

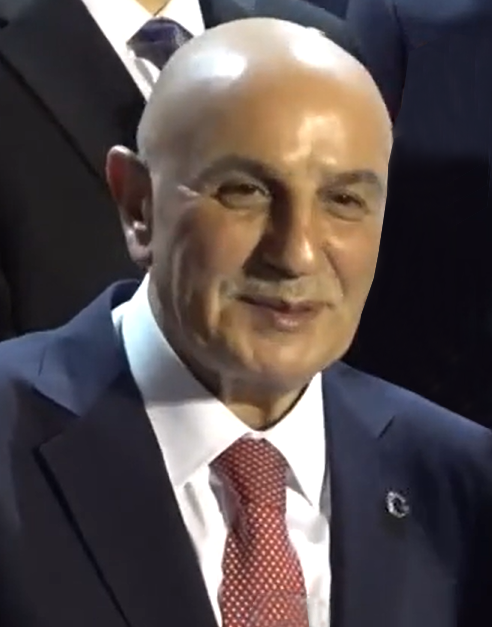
Candidate	Mansur Yavaş	Turgut Altınok
Party	CHP	AK Party
Alliance	N/A	People's Alliance
Popular vote	2,001,722	1,048,111
Percentage	60.51%	31.68%
- District Municipalities
- All 25 municipal districts of Ankara
Party	Seats	+/–
CHP	16	+13
AK Party	8	−11
Independent	1	+1
This lists parties that won seats. See the complete results below.
Mayor before	Mayor after
Mansur Yavaş; CHP	Mansur Yavaş; CHP

Mayoral elections were held in the Turkish province of Ankara as part of nationwide local elections on 31 March 2024. A total of 26 mayors, one for each of the 25 districts of Ankara and one for the Ankara Metropolitan Municipality, were elected.

The results were a landslide victory for the incumbent mayor Mansur Yavaş, the candidate of the main opposition Republican People's Party (CHP), who was re-elected with 60.4% of the vote. The Government candidate was Turgut Altınok of the Justice and Development Party (AK Party), who was the incumbent district mayor of Keçiören. Altınok, who represented the People's Alliance and was therefore also the joint candidate of the Nationalist Movement Party (MHP), won a distant 31.7% of the vote, representing a significant swing away from the governing alliance in Ankara.

The CHP also gained control of the Ankara Metropolitan Municipal Council, which had previously had a government majority that had curtailed Yavaş's ability as Mayor to initiate substantial decisions during his first term.

Throughout the province, the CHP won a landslide of 16 of Ankara's 25 districts, including Altınok's district of Keçiören. This represented an overall increase of 12 from the previous election. The People's Alliance won 8 districts, down from 21. The results were seen as a redefinition of the traditionally nationalist conservative political landscape of Ankara and an indicator of a possible presidential bid by Yavaş in 2028.

== Opinion polling ==
Date	Pollster	Sample	CHP	AK PARTY	İYİ	YRP	ZP	DEM	Others	Lead
29 Mar	BETİMAR	3.060	61.2	28.9	1.4	3.9	2.4	1.4	0.8	32.3
27-29 Mar	Ödzemir	2.500	58.6	33.9	—	3.2	—	—	4.3	24.7
Mart	HBS	2.100	43.2	36.1	4.3	4	2.7	1	2.4	7.1
26-27 Mar	TÜSİAR	2.462	45.1	37.2	4.1	3.7	2.5	3.3	4.2	7.8
25-27 Mar	ORC	3.420	51.5	36.2	3.9	2.6	2	2.1	1.7	15.3
20-26 Mar	ALF	3.850	55.4	35.1	3.1	—	—	—	6.4	20.3
20-26 Mar	ASAL	2.500	54.4	33.8	3.2	2.4	1.2	2.8	2.2	20.6
23-26 Mar	AREA	3.009	60.1	30.5	3.4	3.2	1.4	1.1	0.4	29.6
15-26 Mar	ADA	1.500	56.5	33.4	2.3	3.2	2.3	—	2.3	23.1
12-26 Mar	Avrasya	?	50.3	39.7	—	—	—	—	10	10.6
22-25 Mar	ADAMOR	2.593	55.1	32.7	3.7	2.6	0.9	3.9	1.1	22.4
21-25 Mar	Areda Survey	3.608	47	42.9	1.9	3.8	2	1.7	0.6	4.1
20-25 Mar	SAROS	4.047	47.2	39.1	4.9	3.5	—	—	5.3	8.1
17-19 Mar	KODAR	6.321	54	39	1.4	2.4	—	—	3.2	15
10-15 Mar	AREA	4.405	59.1	30.3	4.2	3.3	1.5	1.2	0.4	28.8
21 Şub-3 Mar	MAK	4.300	44	38	3	4	2	2	3.0	6
21-25 Feb	ALF	2.700	41.4	37.5	6.4	2.3	2.1	—	4.1	3.9
7-14 Feb	Özdemir	2.500	62.4	30.2	1.2	2.5	1.4	1.2	1.1	32.2
Feb	HBS	2.180	40.3	35.2	6.1	2.4	2.5	2.6	3	5.1
8-9 Feb	AREA	1.546	54	40.1	1.7	2.3	1.2	—	0.7	13.9
24-26 Jan	ORC	3.800	43.7	40.9	5.2	—	—	—	3.2	2.8
22-23 Jan	AREA	2.006	57	40.1	—	—	—	—	2.9	16.9
Ocak	HBS	2.100	36.8	34.3	6.1	3	2.9	3.1	5.1	2.5
2024
14-18 Jul	ASAL	2.074	32.3	33.7	8.1	1.8	2.2	4.9	19.0	1.4
2023
31 Mar 2019	2019 election	3.263.648	50.9	47.1	—	—	—	—	1.8	3.8

== Results ==
=== Metropolitan municipality mayoral election ===
==== Overall result ====
Candidate	Party	Votes	%
Mansur Yavaş	Republican People's Party	1,999,281	60.44
Turgut Altınok	Justice and Development Party	1,048,076	31.68
Suat Kılıç	New Welfare Party	103,682	3.13
Hüseyin Bartu Soral	Victory Party	49,954	1.51
Cengiz Topel Yıldırım	Good Party	30,041	0.91
Gültan Kışanak	DEM Party	26,484	0.80
Cafer Güneş	Felicity Party	14,803	0.45
Zafer Burak Hasar	Homeland Party	5,382	0.16
Celal Mümtaz Akıncı	Democracy and Progress Party	5,041	0.15
Serkan Ünver	New Turkey Party	4,937	0.15
Ali Ufuk Arikan	Communist Party of Turkey	4,033	0.12
Fazlı Taşkan	Rights and Freedoms Party	4,019	0.12
Tuvana Naz Ketene	Motherland Party	2,485	0.08
Utku Reyhan	Patriotic Party	2,064	0.06
Mehmet Selim Çetin	Democratic Left Party	1,753	0.05
Salih Koç	Nation Party	1,708	0.05
Figen Topal	Communist Movement of Turkey	1,131	0.03
Abdullah Demiryürek	Justice Unity Party	980	0.03
Murat Yardımcı	Hearth Party	621	0.02
Yunus Murat Güztoklusu	Independent	370	0.01
Mustafa Sanğu	Independent	333	0.01
Korkut Cesur	Independent	317	0.01
Suat Karaman	Independent	249	0.01
Lokman Cengiz	Independent	224	0.01
Total		3,307,968	100.00
Valid votes		3,307,968	96.80
Invalid/blank votes		109,530	3.20
Total votes		3,417,498	100.00
Registered voters/turnout		4,304,874	79.39
