= Melih Gökçek =

Turkish politician (born 1948)

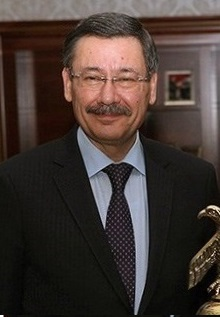
- Melih Gökçek in 2013

Mayor of Ankara
- In office 27 March 1994 – 28 October 2017
- Preceded by: Vedat Aydın
- Succeeded by: Mustafa Tuna

Mayor of Keçiören
- In office 25 March 1984 – 26 March 1989
- Preceded by: position established
- Succeeded by: Hamza Kırmızı

Member of the Grand National Assembly (19th Parliament)
- In office 6 November 1991 – 27 March 1994
- Constituency: Ankara (1991)

Personal details
- Born: İbrahim Melih Gökçek; 20 October 1948 (age 77) Keçiören, Ankara
- Party: AK Party (2003–present)
- Other political affiliations: YP (2001-2003); FP (1998–2001); RP (1991–1999); ANAP (1984–1991)
- Spouse: Nevin Gökçek (m. 1975)
- Children: 2
- Education: Gazi University
- Website: www.melihgokcek.com

İbrahim Melih Gökçek (Turkish pronunciation: [ibɾaˈhim meˈlih ˈɟœctʃec]; born 20 October 1948) is a Turkish politician who served as the mayor of Ankara from 1994 to 2017. From 1991 to 1994, he was an MP. Gökçek has won municipal elections in 1994, 1999, 2004, 2009, and was controversially also declared the winner in 2014. He is a member of the governing AK Party.

== Background and personal life ==
Gökçek was born at Keçiören. Gökçek‘s father Ahmet was Turkish originally from Halfeti and worked as a lawyer in Gaziantep, where he also lived with his wife, Gökçek‘s mother who was from Prizren, Kosovo, and originally descents from a Turkish Seyyid family from Muğla, who migrated to the Region during Ottoman rule. Having his primary, secondary and high school education in Gaziantep, Melih Gökçek graduated from Gazi University, College of Journalism, in Ankara. He worked as Parliament Correspondent and newspaper representative. Gökçek completed his military service as a Reserve Officer at Güzelyurt in Northern Cyprus. He supports Ankaraspor. He is the honorary chairman of MKE Ankaragücü. Football and photography are the greatest hobbies of Gökçek, who is married to Nevin Gökçek, and has two sons, Ahmet and Osman. His son Osman Gökçek is the general editorial coordinator of the Turkish TV channel Beyaz TV.

== Political career ==
After he returned from military service, Gökçek set up a business. Then, as a member of the Motherland Party, he acted from 1984 to 1989 as the Mayor of Keçiören, a district in Ankara, under the leadership of the Mayor of Ankara Metropolitan Municipality, Mehmet Altinsoy. Subsequently, Melih Gökçek ran the Social Services and Child Protection Society as its General Director from 1989 to 1991. In 1991, he entered the parliament as Ankara MP for the Welfare Party. While he was an MP during local elections in 1994, he stood for the post of Mayor of Ankara and won the election. He was re-elected in 1999 as the candidate of the Virtue Party and became the first person to be successively elected as the Mayor of Metropolitan Municipality for two times in the history of Ankara. He then joined the Justice and Development Party and was elected for the same duty for a third time in 2004 and a fourth time in 2009 and thus became the first person to be successively elected as the Mayor of the Metropolitan Municipality for four times in the history of Ankara. Gökçek is also the first mayor in the history of Ankara who was elected four times in a row. Once again Gökçek was nominated by his party, the Justice and Development Party, as its candidate for the post of Mayor of Ankara and won the elections on 30 March 2014. On the eve of the 2014 local elections, several electricity cuts and allegations of vote stealing dominated the vote counting processes, especially in Ankara. Counting was abruptly stopped in the district of Çankaya, a strong pro-opposition district, for unknown reasons before resuming hours after. With Gökçek appearing to be one percentage point ahead of his rival Mansur Yavaş by the morning after the election, a massive campaign was started by the opposition Republican People's Party (CHP) to check all ballot box data. Numerous miscalculations, where CHP votes had been recorded for other parties instead, were observed. Despite this, the Supreme Electoral Council of Turkey rejected the opposition's request for a recount and Gökçek was thus declared the winner. Despite this, most journalists, opposition politicians and western diplomats consider Yavaş to be the true winner of the election. With the Constitutional Court rejecting Yavaş's appeal for a re-vote, the CHP has since taken the case to the European Court of Human Rights. Following President Erdoğan's remarks in 2017 on "rebuilding" the AKP after being elected party leader, it was widely speculated that Gökçek would resign along with five other AKP mayors critical of Erdoğan's increasing authority. During several speeches from May to October 2017 Erdoğan pointed about "metal fatigue" (metal yorgunluğu), referring to long-time incumbent AKP mayors such as Gökçek. On 23 October, Gökçek tweeted his resignation announcement with the farewell ceremony taking place on 28 October.

== Resignation ==
In 2017, President Recep Tayyip Erdoğan called for the "rejuvenation" of the ruling of Justice and Development Party, prompting speculation that long serving AKP mayors, including Gökçek, would be pressured to step down. Between May and October 2017, Erdoğan, repeatedly referenced this "fatigue" among incumbent officials in public remarks. On 23 October 2017, Gökçek announced via Twitter that he would submit his resignation at a meeting at the Ankara Metropolitan Municipal Council on 28 October, becoming the fifth AKP mayor to resign under this pressure, following the mayors of Istanbul, Niğde, Düzce, and Bursa. Gökçek formally resigned on 28 October 2017, ending 23 years in office. At the council meeting, AKP members were present while representatives of the opposition Republican People's Party (CHP) and the Nationalist Movement Party (MHP) declined to attend. In his remarks, Gökçek attributes the resignation to loyalty to Erdoğan and the AKP rather than to fatigue or misconduct, stating he was stepping down because Erdoğan had asked him to.

== Achievements and awards ==
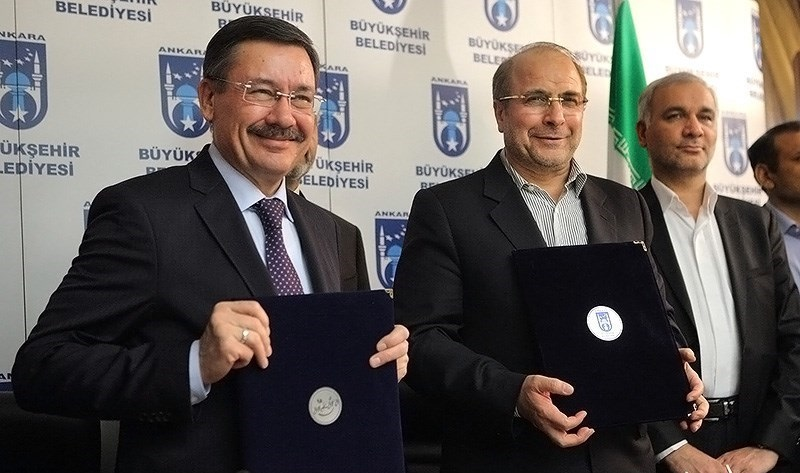
Gökçek with Mayor of Tehran, Mohammad Bagher Ghalibaf signing a sister city contract

Ankara received certain international prizes during his office during Gökçek's administration. On 10 October 2009 Gökçek received the "Europe Prize", the highest distinction that can be bestowed on a European town for its actions in the European domain by the President of the European Parliament, Luis Marie de Puig, at the European Parliament in Strasbourg. The decision was taken unanimously by the Committee on the Environment, Agriculture and Local and Regional Affairs of the Council of Europe's Parliamentary Assembly (PACE). "Ankara's modern view deserved the award," de Puig said during the award ceremony. "This is a historic day," Gökçek said. "The Council of Europe did not ignore our activities. We have received many national and international awards, but this is the most important so far," he concluded. Ankara, which was already awarded the "European Flag of Honor" in 2001 and the "European Plaque of Honor" in 2003, is the third European city after Vienna and The Hague to get all these awards. The Greater Municipality of Ankara received three awards for its city projects by the OICC which has four prize categories during an award ceremony held in Doha in May 2010 with the participation of 170 representatives from 54 different countries. It won the first prizes in the "Urban and Regional Planning" as well as the "Landscaping" categories for the "North Ankara Urban Renewal Project" as well as the "Göksu Park" project and the second prize in the "Environment, Conservation and Sustainable Development" category for the "Mogan Park" project. The municipality of Turkey's capital city Ankara was also presented with the World Water Organization's (WWO) "Best Practice Award" with its "Kızılırmak River Project" on 8 April 2010. WWO presented its "World Water Awards" during a ceremony held at the United Nations (UN) headquarters in New York, USA, on the first day of a two-day international conference on "Water and Global Health". Speaking at the ceremony, WWO's board member Elaine Valdov said that Ankara had experienced a serious water shortage problem from 2007 to 2008, and "Kızılırmak River Rehabilitation Project" had been initiated under the guidance of Ankara Mayor Melih Gökçek to solve the matter. "This water project has been a perfect example that displays the cooperation between public institutions and the private sector," Valdov said. Greater Ankara Municipality has also won four LivCom awards (The International Awards for Liveable Communities) at the competition during the 2012 Finals held in Al-Ain City (UAE) in collaboration with UNEP (The United Nations Environment Programme) 22–26 November 2012: Project Awards: Community Centres and Public Areas category (Gold) and Built category (Silver) - Criteria Awards: Community Participation and Empowerment category (Gold) and Healthy Lifestyle category (Silver). The presidency city of the Association of Towns Awarded the Europe Prize has been carried out by Greater Ankara Municipality since 2011. Gökçek has been re-elected unanimously for the Presidency of the Association for the 2013–2015 term on 3 May 2013 in Würzburg. During its 2012 IMA Conference and Impact Awards event held Sept 20–22 at CityCenter in Las Vegas, the Internet Marketing Association (IMA) awarded Gökçek with the award for the "BEST Social Media by a Mayor in the World". The Impact Awards recognize exemplary achievement in all facets of Internet marketing with a wide range of organizations of all sizes and business sectors represented. Melih Gökçek was awarded the same prize during the IMPACT13 Awards (Sept 25–27, 2013 CityCenter, Las Vegas) where also Ankara Municipality was chosen for the "Best Use of Technology by an International Municipality".

== Criticism ==
In 2003, Gökçek tried to ban the pedestrian crossing in Ankara's busiest crossroads, demanding that pedestrians walk through the underpasses. Activists protested the city center being closed off completely from pedestrians and declared that the mayor unilaterally taking such a decision was against the law. Gökçek announced that he would call for a referendum; a court eventually found the mayor's proposal unlawful on the basis that Gökçek had bused in supporters from Ankara Province's rural areas to vote in favor of his pedestrian ban. Gökçek also drew criticism after he replaced the middle four lanes of a major road to a new underpass and constructed a recreation complex on the over plot named Gökkuşağı ("Rainbow"). Due to its construction in between the city's busiest lanes, the cafes and shops in the complex have never been put in use. The complex cost 3.61 million Turkish liras (approximately 3.11 million dollars at the time) and has been left unused between 2005 and 2012. During the 2007 water crisis of Ankara, Gökçek suggested the water be transported from the Kızılırmak river. The Department of Environmental Engineering of Middle East Technical University tested the water and concluded that the samples contained toxins and were not suitable for drinking. Days after the report, Gökçek's office fined the university 1.8 million liras on charges that have been described as retribution for the report. On 1 June 2012, Gökçek was criticized for commenting "Women kill their babies born out of adultery. Why do babies die because of these so-called mothers? Let mothers kill themselves." during a television broadcast. Gökçek is personally active on his Twitter account. During the 2013 protests in Turkey, he was criticized for inflammatory communications. One of his tweets read: "Here is your 'precious' protesters" and contained a link to a video which supposedly showed a policeman being beaten by protesters. The video was found not to be related to the protests. In contrast to Gökçek's claims, interventions by police in Ankara against protesters were particularly violent, resulting in a reprimand from the European Union and international condemnation. Also during the protests, Mellih Gökçek described BBC Turkey reporter Selin Girit as an "English spy", launching a campaign against her on Twitter. In early July 2014 Gökçek supported the antisemitic tweet made by Turkish singer Yıldız Tilbe: "God bless Hitler, it was even too few what he did to the Jews, he was right" and "The Jews will be destroyed by Muslims, in the name of Allah, not much time left for it be done". Gökçek backed the singer's Gaza tweets, retweeting most of her comments except the one on Hitler, calling them "full of intelligence." He also replied to the tweet, saying "I applaud you". In March 2015, Gökçek filed a formal complaint on defamation charges against journalist Hayko Bağdat because he called him an Armenian. The complainant's petition to the court stated: "The statements [by Bağdat] are false and include insult and libel." Gökçek also demanded 10,000 liras in compensation under a civil lawsuit against Bağdat for psychological damages, and the lawsuit is now pending.

== Works ==
- Sol Siyaset FETÖ İlişkileri [The Political Left and Its Connections to FETÖ]. Ankara: Motto Yayınları, 2017.

Political offices
Preceded by Vedat Aydın	Mayor of Ankara; 27 March 1994–28 October 2017	Succeeded by Mustafa Tuna
