= Mehmet Özhaseki =

Turkish politician (born 1957)

Mehmet Özhaseki MP
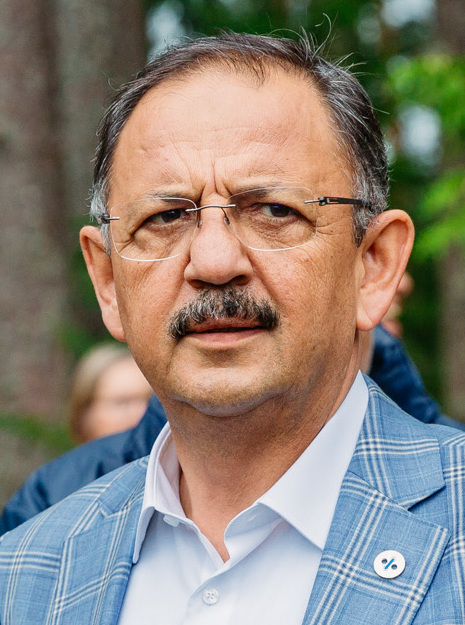
- Özhaseki in 2017

Minister of Environment, Urbanisation and Climate Change
- In office 4 June 2023 – 2 July 2024
- President: Recep Tayyip Erdoğan
- Preceded by: Murat Kurum
- Succeeded by: Murat Kurum
- In office 24 May 2016 – 10 July 2018
- Prime Minister: Binali Yıldırım
- Preceded by: Fatma Güldemet Sarı
- Succeeded by: Murat Kurum

Member of the Grand National Assembly
- In office 7 June 2015 – 2 June 2023
- Constituency: Kayseri (Jun 2015, Nov 2015, 2018)

Mayor of Kayseri
- In office 23 June 1998 – 10 February 2015
- Preceded by: Şükrü Karatepe
- Succeeded by: Mustafa Çelik

Mayor of Melikgazi
- In office 27 March 1994 – 23 June 1998
- Preceded by: Şevket Bahçecioğlu
- Succeeded by: Memduh Büyükkılıç

Personal details
- Born: May 25, 1957 (age 69) Kayseri, Turkey
- Party: Justice and Development Party
- Education: Istanbul University
- Occupation: Politician

Mehmet Özhaseki (born 25 May 1957) is a Turkish politician of the Justice and Development Party (AK Party) and former Minister of Environment, Urbanisation and Climate Change. He is a former Mayor of Kayseri.

== Early life and education ==
Mehmet Özhaseki was born in Kayseri, Turkey on 25 May 1957. Özhaseki began his education in Kayseri and went on to study electronic engineering at Hacettepe University. He completed his education at the Istanbul University Faculty of Law.

== Political career ==
=== Mayor of Kayseri ===
He was elected to the Melikgazi Municipality in the March 1994 elections. In the 2004 elections he was elected Mayor of Kayseri with 72% of the vote. According to Christopher Caldwell, he attributes his success to "good government". He stood again in the March 2009 election and was re-elected as Mayor of Kayseri.

=== Minister of Environment and Urban Planning ===
Özhaseki was elected as a Justice and Development Party (AKP) Member of Parliament for Ankara's Kayseri in the June 2015 general election. He was re-elected in November 2015. He was appointed as the Minister of Environment and Urban Planning in the 65th government of Turkey by Prime Minister Binali Yıldırım on 24 November 2015. He was subsequently replaced by Murat Kurum but then reappointed. He was once again replaced by Murat Kurum in 2024.

== See also ==
- Climate change in Turkey
- Environmental issues in Turkey
- 2024 United Nations Biodiversity Conference
