= List of municipalities in Rize Province =

This is the List of municipalities in Rize Province, Turkey as of January 2023.

District	Municipality
Ardeşen	Ardeşen
Ardeşen	Tunca
Çamlıhemşin	Çamlıhemşin
Çayeli	Büyükköy
Çayeli	Çayeli
Çayeli	Madenli
Derepazarı	Derepazarı
Fındıklı	Fındıklı
Güneysu	Güneysu
Hemşin	Hemşin
İkizdere	İkizdere
İyidere	İyidere
Kalkandere	Kalkandere
Pazar	Pazar
Rize	Kendirli
Rize	Muradiye
Rize	Rize
Rize	Salarha
