= Tülay Eratalay =

Turkish screenwriter (born 1945)

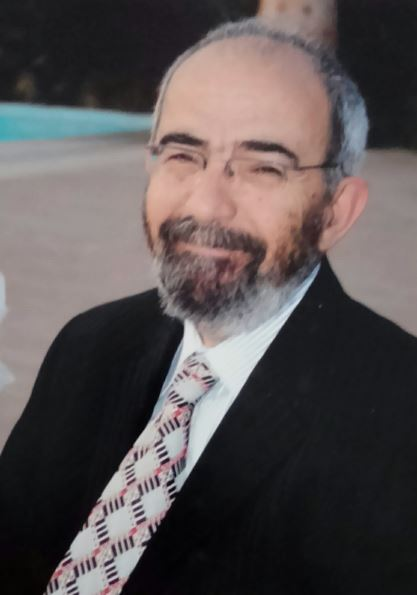
- Born: 21 December 1945; Çorlu, Turkey
- Died: 25 February 2026 (aged 80); Ankara, Turkey
- Occupations: Director, producer, screen writer
- Years active: 1968–2008
- Notable work: Özlem...Düne, Bugüne, Yarına; Düş, Gerçek, Bir de Sinema

Tülay Eratalay (21 December 1945, Çorlu, Turkey – 25 February 2026, Ankara, Turkey) was a Turkish director, producer and screenwriter. He won three awards at 32nd Antalya Golden Orange Film Festival with Özlem...Düne, Bugüne, Yarına.

== Life ==
He was born in Tekirdağ, Çorlu in 1945. His father was Rıza and his mother was Macide. Since Rıza Eratalay was a cavalry non-commissioned officer he travelled a lot during his childhood. In his youth he ran trail running in the Ankara Demirspor club. After finishing Gazi High School he entered law school but ieft after one year to enroll in public administration in Ankara University. In 1968 he entered TRT as director. He was trained by BBC personnel. He directed various educatonal, musical, documentart and drama programmes. He was one of the last remaining TRT schooled directors. He retired from TRT in 2008. He died on 25 February 2026.

=== Family ===
In 1973, he married Neriman Eratalay who was a dean in Hacettepe University French Teaching Department. His son Ogün, was born in 1975.

=== Politic views ===
He had a yellow press card and was a member of Çağdaş Gazeteciler Derneği. He was a general secretary of Television Programmers Union. He was a member of Türkiye İşçi Partisi before 12 Eylül 1980 coup. He was summonned to court concerning his production of Aynaroz Kadısı in 1982. He was taken into custody illegallity in 1983 based on his political views. He was tortured in Mamak Prison between 5–13 October 1983 and he got a medical report proving this application. After the ascent of AKP to power he was once again targeted by the regime. He was assigned to an irrelevant position in TRT but he sued the TRT board management and won the case, reassigning to original position. He supported Türkiye Komünist Partisi in general elections and became a member on the party's 100th anniversary.

== Works ==
=== Awarded films ===
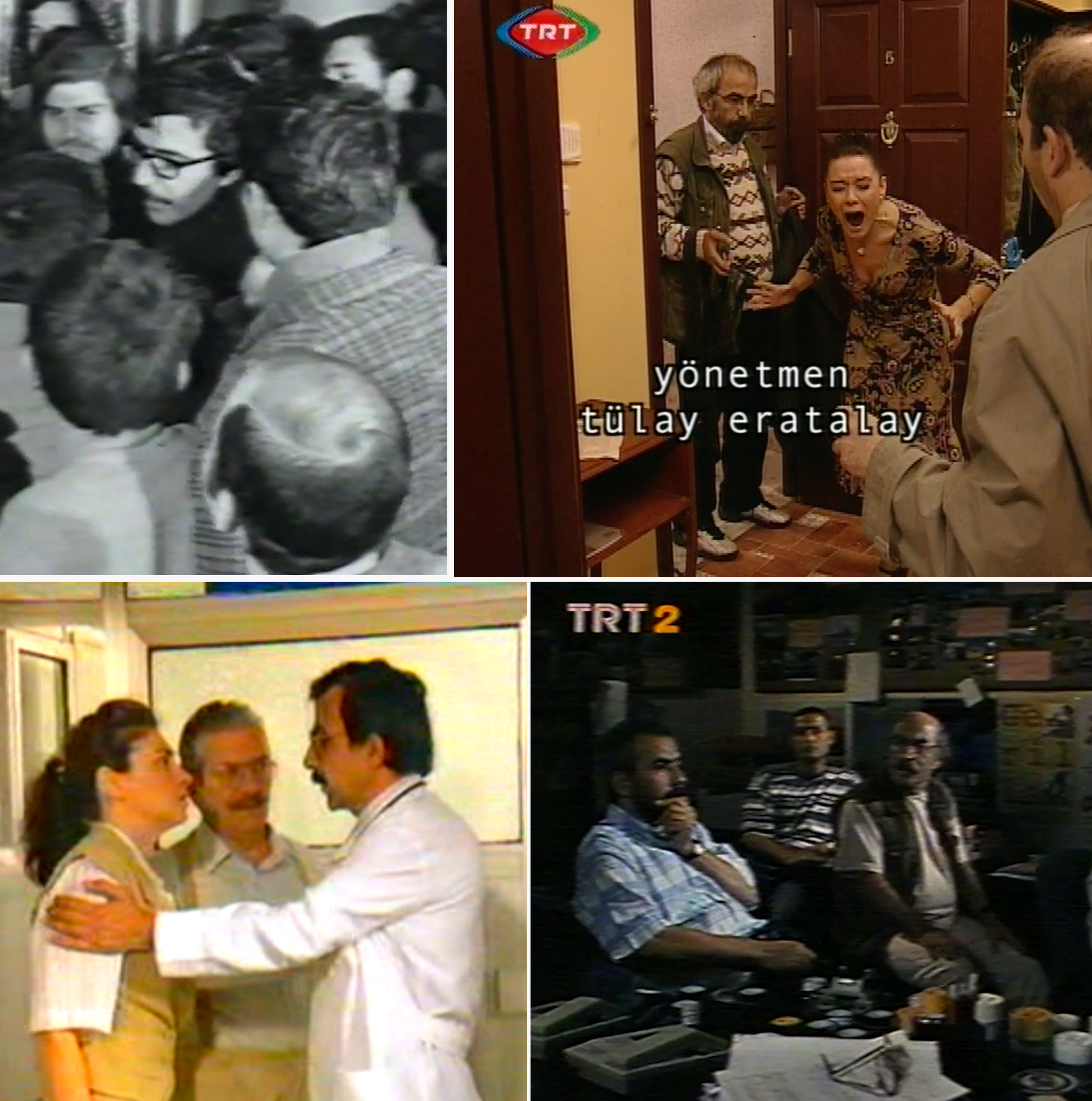
Tülay Eratalay used cameo appearance scenes frequently. Starting from upper left counter clockwise: 1972 Bir Yılbaşı Hikâyesi-1990 Öyle Bir Şey ki-1998 Yazılar Filmatik-2005 Sanatçının Ölümü

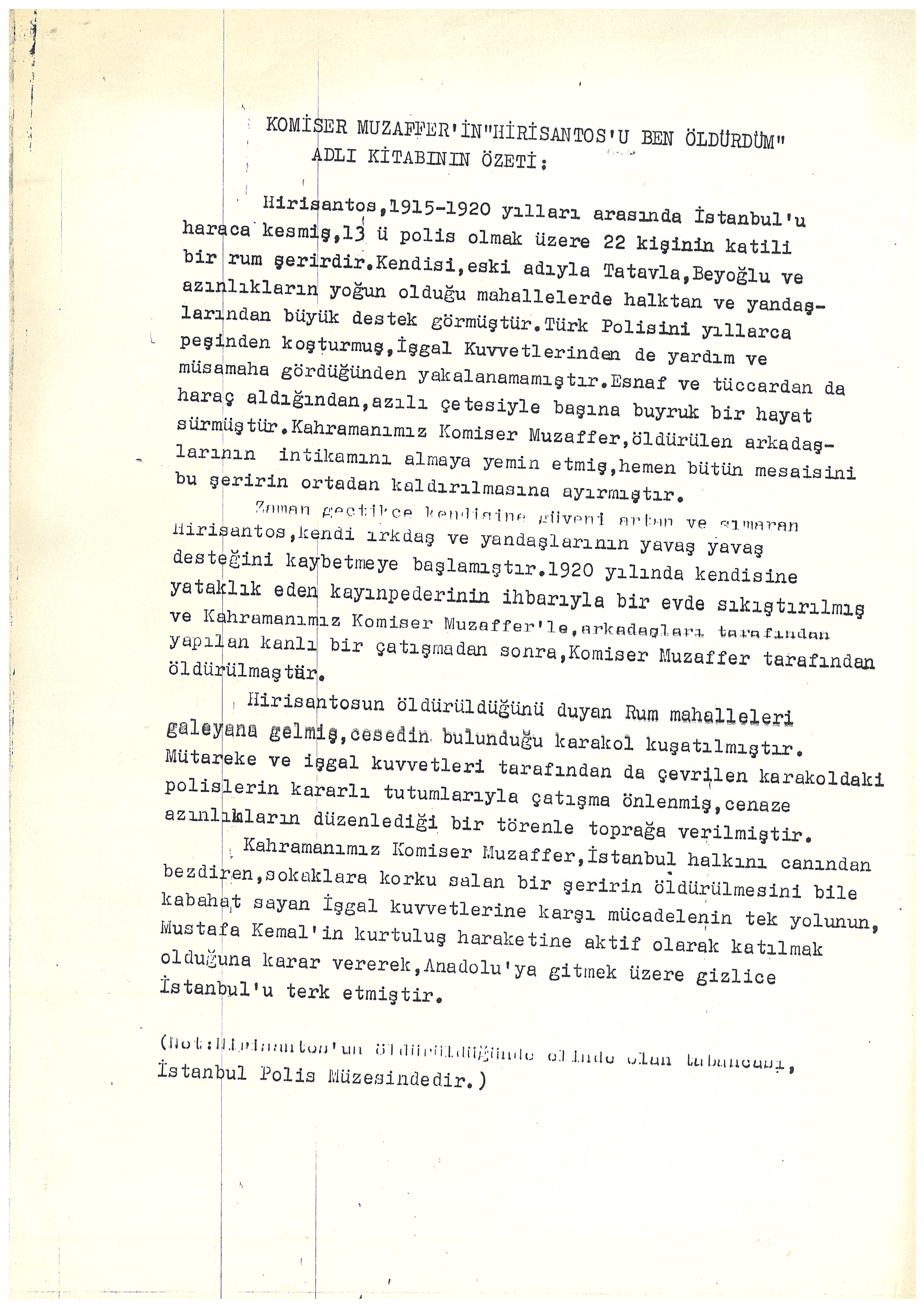
Synopsis by Tülay Eratalay about a drama about Hrisantos. The proposal was refused by the then TRT administration.

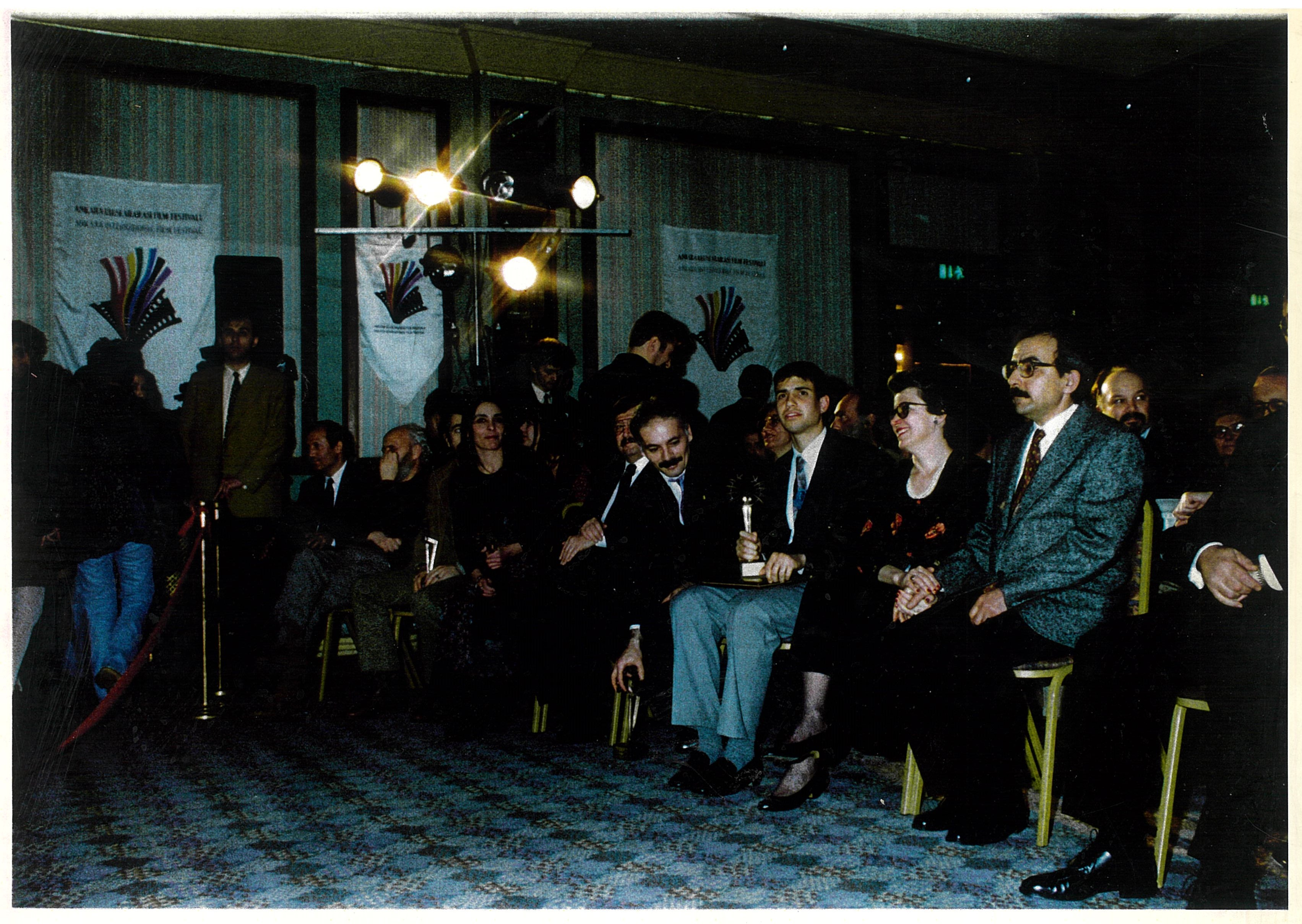
Tülay Eratalay at Ankara Film Festival Award ceremony

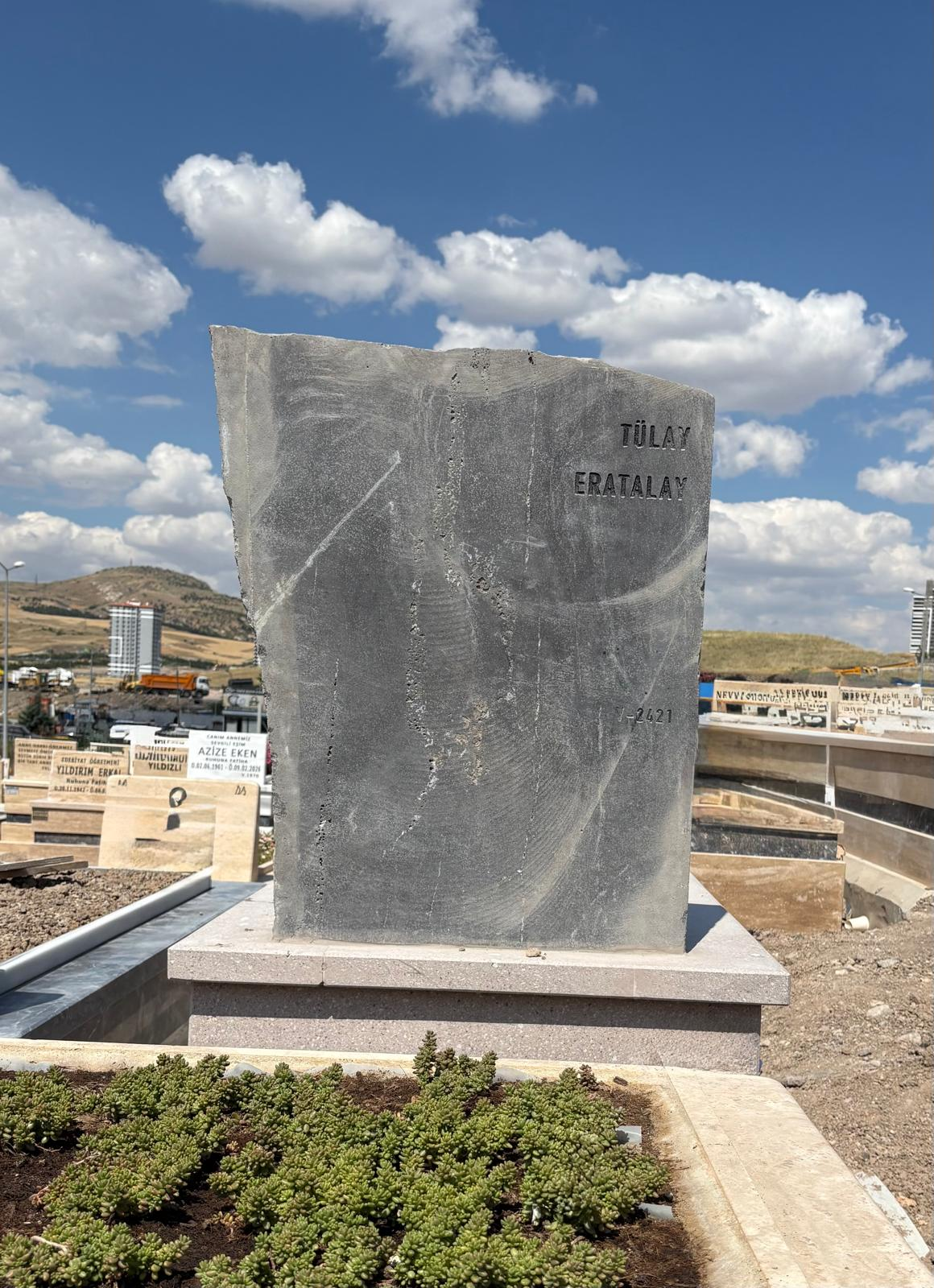
His grave

His film Düş, Gerçek, Bir de Sinema (1995) won the best film, best director, best male and female actor and best film music. This film won the third award in best film category and best supporting actor awards in 12th Adana Altın Koza Film Festival. Özlem...Düne, Bugüne, Yarına (1995) won the best second film, best scenario, best supporting actress awards in 32nd Antalya Altın Portakal Film Festival and the best actress awards in 10th Ankara Film Festival.

=== Films ===
- 1995: Düş, Gerçek, Bir de Sinema
- 1995: Özlem...Düne, Bugüne, Yarına

=== TV Drama ===
- 2005: Sanatçının Ölümü[14]
- 2000: Bizim Evin Halleri[17]
- 2000: Baykuşların Saltanatı – 13 episode
- 1995: Öykülerde Yaşayanlar – 13 different short stories
  - Temmuz Ağustos Eylül – Adapted by Yusuf Kurçenli based on a novel of the same name by Selçuk Baran
  - Aşk Artık Burada Oturmuyor – Adapted by Aykut Tankuter based on a novel of the same name by Nazlı Eray
  - Boşlukta Bir Yer – Adapted by Aykut Tankuter based on a novel of the same name by Ahmet Cemal
  - Serada Aşk – Adapted by Aykut Tankuter based on a novel of the same name by Barlas Özarıkça
  - Haliç Rüzgârı – Adapted by Aykut Tankuter based on a novel of the same name by Oktay Akbal
  - Ah – Adapted by Tülay Eratalay based on short story named Alafranga İhtiyar in the book called Mağara Arkadaşları by Ayfer Tunç
- 1993: Ferhunde Hanımlar
- 1990: Öyle Bir Şey ki – 3 episodes
- 1976: Ağustos Böceği
- 1975: Fareler ve İnsanlar
- 1975: Böyle Bir Aşk
- 1972: Gecikenler
- 1972: Bir Yılbaşı Hikâyesi
- 1972: Cengiz Han’ın Bisikleti
- 1973: Hayattan Yapraklar
- 1973: Don Kişot
- 1973: Fatih

=== Documentaries ===
- 1988: Korkma Sönmez
- 1978: Gülyağı Belgeseli
- 1977: Petrol Belgeseli

=== Scenarios ===
- 1994: Cadı Ağacı, adapted by Tülay Eratalay from a novel by the same name by Ayla Kutlu
