= 13th Republican People's Party Extraordinary Convention =

Party election in Turkey

Republican People's Party Convention, 2005
- 29–30 January 2005
- Turnout: 82.04% (nomination); 97.29% (election)
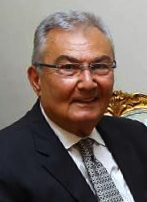

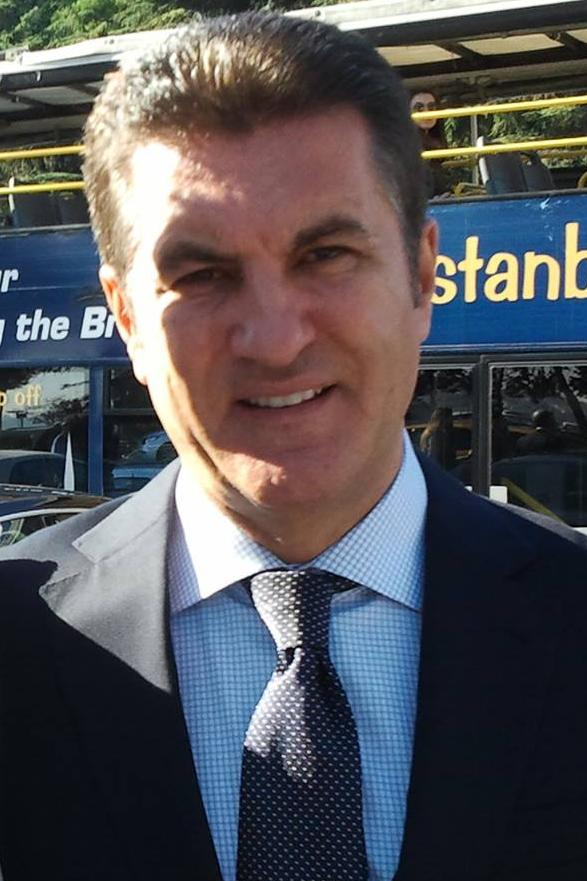
Candidate	Deniz Baykal	Mustafa Sarıgül
Party	CHP	CHP
Constituency	Antalya	Istanbul
Delegates' vote	674	460
Percentage	59.44%	40.56%
Leader before election
Deniz Baykal
CHP
Elected Leader
Deniz Baykal
CHP

The 13th Extraordinary Convention of the Republican People's Party (Turkish: 13. Cumhuriyet Halk Partisi Olağanüstü Kurultayı) was held on 29 and 30 January 2005 in order to elect a leader for the Republican People's Party (CHP), a Turkish centre-left political party. Incumbent leader Deniz Baykal was challenged by the Mayor of Şişli, Mustafa Sarıgül for the leadership. The convention was marred by violence between supporters of the two rivals, who had accused each other of corruption and elitism during their speeches. The final result was a victory for Baykal, who won 59.4% of the delegates' votes against Sarıgül's 40.6%.

Issues discussed were the CHP's performance in the 2004 local elections, which was substantially below expectations and even resulted in the loss of Baykal's home province of Antalya to the ruling Justice and Development Party (AKP). Sarıgül claimed that Baykal had lost the support of most voters and had isolated the party from the people due to perceived elitism. Baykal in turn criticised Sarıgül due to alleged corruption charges and subsequently resulted in fights breaking out between rival party members, which was brought under control by security forces.

The convention was the last to feature a leadership election with more than one candidate until the 2014 extraordinary convention 9 years later.

== Background ==
The Republican People's Party, initially founded by revolutionary leader Mustafa Kemal Atatürk in 1921, was re-established by Deniz Baykal in 1992 after the party was shut down after the 1980 military coup. Since party leaders in Turkish politics tend to wield substantial power due to the Political parties law (SPK), the convention was significant for having more than one candidate for the leadership. The convention was held at the Ahmet Taner Kışlalı stadium in Çankaya, Ankara.

Baykal took the decision to hold an extraordinary convention after the party's discipline tribunal (YDK) upheld Sarıgül's CHP membership despite alleged corruption charges. The CHP central executive committee (MYK) had previously proposed Sarıgül's expulsion, but the refusal of the tribunal to do so resulted in Baykal accusing members of the tribunal of taking bribes. Baykal took the decision to hold a convention with a leadership election, a party council election and a YDK election.

== Leadership candidates ==
The two candidates were:

- Deniz Baykal – incumbent leader since 1992 and Member of Parliament from Antalya
- Mustafa Sarıgül – serving Mayor of the district of Şişli in Istanbul between 1999 and 2014

To run for election, a candidate needs to be nominated by at least 20% of the party delegates. With 1,028 out of the 1,253 delegates taking part in the nomination process, 251 signatures were necessary in order to be eligible to run for election. The nominations were as follows.

Candidate	Signatures	Percentage	Result
Deniz Baykal	664	64.59	Nominated
Mustafa Sarıgül	364	35.41	Nominated
Total	1,028	100.0	2 candidates
Source: Sabah

=== Deniz Baykal ===
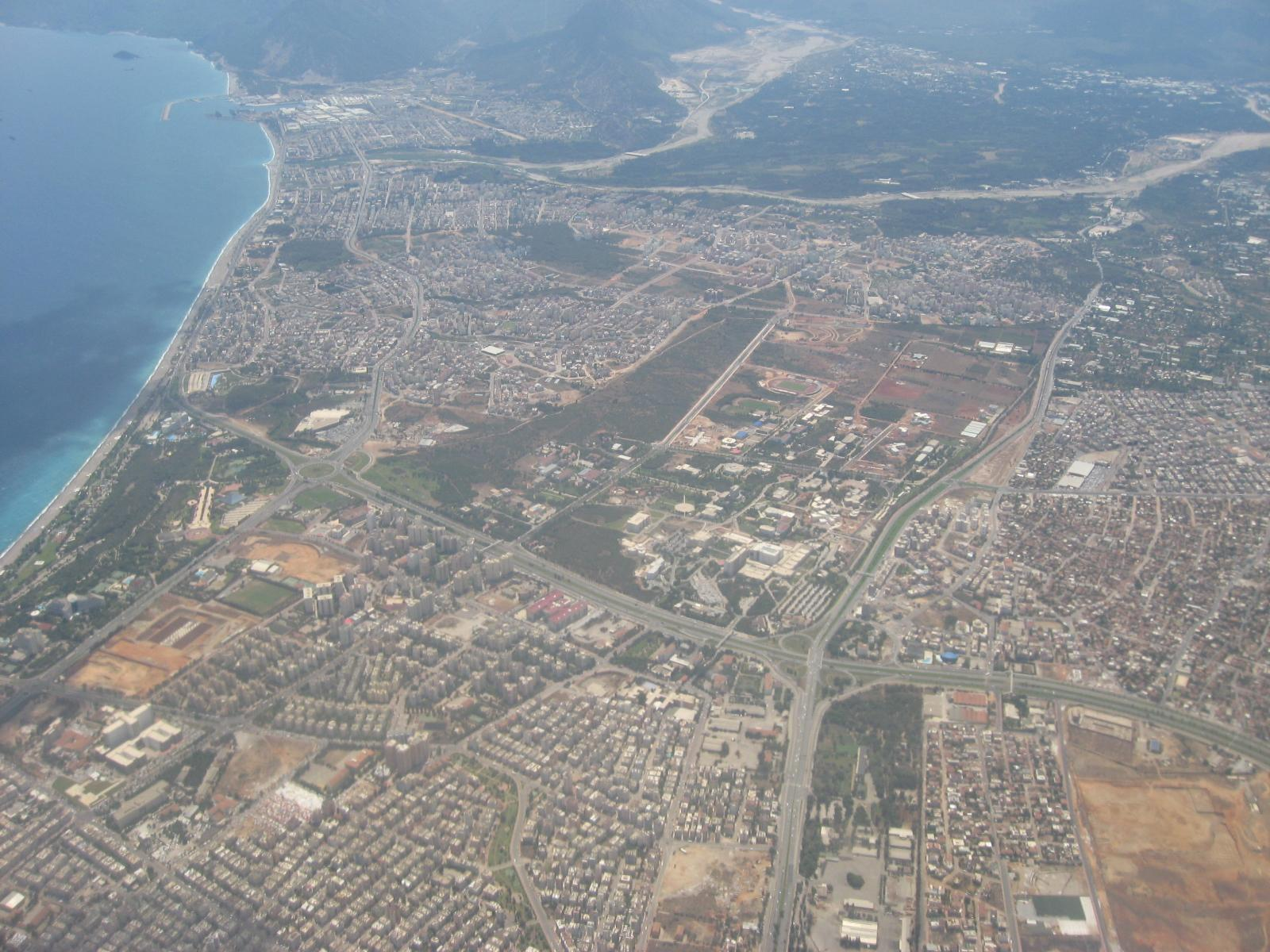
Antalya, the province from which Deniz Baykal is from and serves as a Member of Parliament

Baykal claimed that Sarıgül had failed to answer the corruption allegations made against him, which according to Baykal meant that Sarıgül had accepted them. In an attack against Sarıgül, Baykal stated, "you have money. I don't know who you've organised with that money but you can never organise the CHP." He further went on to claim that if the Turkish Republic respected the rule of law, then Sarıgül was obliged to answer to the allegations and sever relations with his party. He also claimed that in the event of Sarıgül not leaving the CHP, the party would take steps to remove him. In response to the aggression between rival party members, he also stated that he would continue serving as leader despite the difficult conditions, and that no-one could stop him or his supporters from speaking the truths. In another attack against Sarıgül, Baykal claimed that, "even your father, let alone you, cannot chase me away from this party, who do you think you are?"

Baykal was heckled by Sarıgül's supporters, who chanted "Baykal, don't make brothers fight brothers, you are a liar!" He responded to the hecklers by claiming that he was simply doing his job and that not a single page of a report published in regard to the Şişli municipality had been published, and that a mayor who had been accused of corruption had no right to attack the party leader and should instead "sit in his place".

In response to the alleged bribery of discipline tribunal members, Baykal stated that bribed had been made to the members by the Şişli municipality via Balıkesir. He claimed that Sarıgül was also an associate of Prime Minister Recep Tayyip Erdoğan, who he alleged had visited Sarıgül prior to the 2004 local elections to discuss "local issues". Baykal questioned the motives of the Prime Minister, arguing that it was unlikely that a Prime Minister would visit a mayoral candidate simply to discuss "regional issues". He also stated that there was no corruption-linked account belonging to any of his children or wife.

Baykal spoke out in favour of the leadership election due to the fact that it would strengthen the party. However, he also stated that he would not allow bullying or banditry in his party. His speech was regularly met with boos and the party's council president Şinasi Öktem had to regularly intervene and call for calm. When slogans such as "fascists, out!" resulted in fights breaking out, Baykal had to pause for 15 minutes before resuming his speech, while Öktem threatened to call the police.

Baykal also criticised the intense media speculation and coverage of the convention, claiming that it was part of a plot to change the CHP's leadership and turn it into a "copy" of the AKP. He claimed that such media groups, who were allegedly biased in favour of the AKP, wanted to change the leadership not for the good of their party but instead to benefit themselves.

=== Mustafa Sarıgül ===
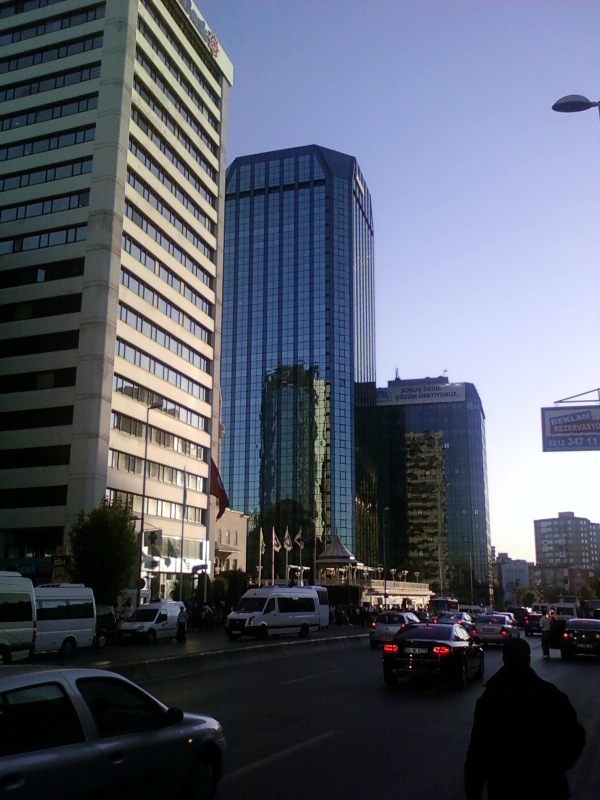
The Şişli Municipality in Istanbul, where Sarıgül served as mayor for three terms between 1999 and 2014

Initially prevented by Baykal's supporters from delivering his speech, Sarıgül was eventually allowed on stage, receiving boos from Baykal's supporters but applause from his own. In response to the allegations of corruption made by Baykal, Sarıgül responded by saying that he did not have a single judicial case opened against him and called on Baykal to consider the effects of such allegations on their children. He also recalled earlier events where Baykal was a strong supporter of Sarıgül's achievements as Mayor of Şişli.

In terms of the party's projects and policies, Sarıgül claimed that the lack of campaigning and interest in the Kurdish populated south-eastern region of Turkey was a sign that Baykal was only interested in protecting his friends and vested interests from election to election rather than trying to expand the party's electoral base. He stated that in the event of his election as party leader, he would form a shadow cabinet and travel the entire country with his shadow ministers.

Sarıgül also attacked Baykal on his electoral record, saying that he had failed to take the party into government for the last "10 to 15 years." He claimed that this was a reason for the loss of traditional centre-left support that had previously prevailed in former strongholds such as Antalya. Sarıgül also blamed the loss of the CHP's traditional ground on Baykal's "inner-party opposition". He further stated that the CHP was slowly eroding away under Baykal's leadership, and claimed that the convention would result in the expulsion of those who "had left the party below the election threshold" in reference to the party's performance in the 1999 general election.

During his speech, Baykal's supporters heckled Sarıgül by chanting the slogan, "the AKP [Justice and Development Party] is proud of you!" In response, Sarıgül said, "the AKP is proud of those who have failed to take the CHP into government!"

== Conduct ==
The convention was marred by violence erupting between rival supporters of Baykal and Sarıgül, most notably during the speeches of both candidates.

A fight began after Sarıgül first arrived at the convention, with Sarıgül allegedly punching the Mayor of Bakırköy, Ateş Ünal Erzen as well as other delegates. Furthermore, an argument broke out between newly elected council President Şinasi Öktem and Şanlıurfa MP Turan Tüysüz, after which Tüysüz allegedly punched Öktem.

The speeches of the leadership candidates were met with slogans and boos from their rivals. Deniz Baykal was forced to take a 15-minute break when party members began throwing their chairs at each other when he mentioned Sarıgül's corruption allegations. Despite Öktem attempting to restore calm on several occasions, riot police forces were eventually called in to curb the violence.

== Election results ==
=== Leadership election ===
Candidate	Votes	Percentage
Deniz Baykal	674	59.44
Mustafa Sarıgül	460	40.56
Total	1,134	100.0
Invalid/blank votes	85	-
Number of delegates/turnout	1,219	97.29
Source: NTVMSNBC

=== Party council election ===
The party council presidency was mainly contested by Şinasi Öktem, a supporter of Baykal and Şahap İnce, a supporter of Sarıgül. Öktem was eventually elected as council president.

== Analysis ==
The substantial victory for Baykal was not necessarily a result of a better campaign in relation to that of Sarıgül. Rather, the party election rules which uses a delegate system to elect a leader heavily favours the incumbent. This is because the party leader has a large influence over who the delegates are, meaning that it is unlikely that their votes would sway in accordance to leadership campaigns due to existing vested interests. The election system, which only gives just over a thousand party delegates the vote, is a key issue of debate in Turkish politics in general, as it is seen as a key limitation to inner-party democracy. The lack of a leader's accountability to their own party has arguably resulted in large-scale political apathy within Turkey, since leaders have continued to remain as party leaders regardless of how disappointing their election performances have been. An example is former Democratic Left Party leader Bülent Ecevit, who stayed on as leader even though his party went from winning 22.2% of the vote in the 1999 general election to winning just 1.2% in the 2002 general election. Denis Baykal is another example, since he refused to resign after his party was wiped out in the 1999 general election for winning less than the 10% threshold necessary to win parliamentary representation.

== Aftermath ==
Deniz Baykal continued to lead the CHP until 2010, while Mustafa Sarıgül was eventually expelled from the party by the new members of the Supreme Discipline Tribunal by the popular vote of 15 members in March 2005, accused of inciting aggression during the convention. He founded the Turkish Change Movement (TDH), though he supported Kemal Kılıçdaroğlu after he was elected CHP leader in the 2010 ordinary convention. He was readmitted into the party ahead of the 2014 local elections during which he was the CHP's metropolitan mayoral candidate for Istanbul.
