= 11th Republican People's Party Extraordinary Convention =

Republican People's Party Convention, 2000
- 30 September 2000
Candidate	Deniz Baykal	Altan Öymen
Party	CHP	CHP
Constituency	Antalya	Istanbul
Delegate vote	543	355
Percentage	59.5%	38.9%
Candidate	Hasan Fehmi Güneş	Sefa Sirmen
Party	CHP	CHP
Constituency	Istanbul	Kocaeli
Delegate vote	12	3
Percentage	1.3%	0.3%
Leader before election
Altan Öymen
CHP
Elected Leader
Deniz Baykal
CHP

The 11th Republican People's Party Extraordinary Convention was held on 30 September 2000 in Ankara to elect a leader for the Republican People's Party (CHP), a political party in Turkey. Former Foreign Minister and Deputy Prime Minister Deniz Baykal was elected as leader for a third non-consecutive time, replacing Altan Öymen who came second. Baykal had initially resigned as leader after the 1999 general election where the CHP lost all its parliamentary representation. All 60 members of the party council as well as the 15 members of the High Disciplinary Board were also elected.

The convention was called after a dispute between the party leader and the Central Executive Committee. The dispute arose after the CHP provincial office for Mersin was accused of illegally recruiting members, to which Öymen responded by demanding the accused officials to step down from their positions. After bringing up the dispute at a party council meeting, Öymen decided that the only way to settle the lack of confidence in his leadership was to call an extraordinary convention with a leadership election.

== Conduct ==
The convention began at 11:30am with a tribute to Mustafa Kemal Atatürk and İsmet İnönü and a recital of the Independence March. The convention was attended by the former leader of the Social Democratic Populist Party Erdal İnönü and the former leader of SODEP Cezmi Kartay. Tribunes were reserved for journalists and observers while the middle seats were reserved for delegates and senior party officials. Observers from the True Path Party, Motherland Party, Nationalist Movement Party and the Türk-İş trade union were also present.

== Leadership candidates ==
=== Deniz Baykal ===
Deniz Baykal had initially resigned after leading his party into an electoral wipeout at the 1999 general election. Despite this, he later claimed that he was honoured to be re-elected as the party's leader. Baykal stressed that Turkish politics was going through a difficult time, referring to the disagreement between Prime Minister Bülent Ecevit and President Ahmet Necdet Sezer and the subsequent financial crash. He further stated that everyone should respect the judicial verdict on the closure case against the Islamist Virtue Party.

In his speech lasting 1.5 hours, Baykal stated that the party's tradition of factionalism had to change and peace had to exist between members. He claimed that the CHP could not become the 'confederation of people who hate each other' and claimed that Öymen's leadership had been dominated with good but wrong intentions. He blamed his party's poor election result in 1999 on the 'hypnosis' of PKK leader Abdullah Öcalan's arrest and Bülent Ecevit's subsequent rise in popularity. Baykal was continuously booed during his speech and had to stop on numerous occasions. He further blamed the result on 'political conditions never seen before', such as a sudden rise in popularity for the far-right Nationalist Movement Party. He stated that he did not need to defend his electoral performance, and that the government of Mesut Yılmaz that the CHP brought down just over a month before the 1999 election was subsequently brought down by the electorate.

=== Altan Öymen ===
Altan Öymen had been elected leader of the party after Baykal resigned in 1999. As the party leader, Öymen initially opened the convention by claiming that the lack of parliamentary representation had hurt the party's ability to reach out to the electorate. Expressing the need to help low-income families and tackle inflation, Öymen accused the government of having 'no intention of tackling corruption'. He also expressed that the party needed to reform and modernise itself. He claimed that should he be re-elected, the CHP would 'run to power' and pressured inner-party rivals to not damage the party through infighting.

Öymen also denied that the CHP had been effective in blocking proposed legislation prepared by the Banking Board (KHK), claiming that although he supported the president's decision to veto the legislation, the CHP was not interested and did not have any intent or means of blocking such legislation. He further claimed that the government had expected the president to comply with them as a result of supporting his election and denied the claims that the president's staff had been influenced by the CHP.

=== Hasan Fehmi Güneş ===
Hasan Fehmi Güneş's campaign focused mainly on the failures of both Baykal and Öymen, claiming that neither leader had been able to create policies or a strong leadership. He accused the former leaders of 'portraying' an aura of progress and also attempting to shift the party to the right. Expressing his view that the CHP was Turkey's biggest and most organised party, he claimed that rather than having a convention, the party should have been preparing for a highly expected early general election. Güneş stated that the leadership election was not simply an election for the party leader, but also a referendum on whether 8.7% (the CHP's vote share in the 1999 general election) was an appropriate election result. Güneş proposed to make the party the 'left's biggest party' in Turkey. Güneş also referred to Öymen's 15 month leadership as '15 months of waste'.

=== Sefa Sirmen ===
Sefa Sirmen was the municipal mayor of İzmit when he announced his candidacy for the leadership. His arrival at the convention was met with substantial applause.

=== Hurşit Güneş ===
Hurşit Güneş initially expressed an intention to stand for the election, but withdrew after the other candidates were finalised. Güneş claimed that the convention would not have a positive impact the party and did not see the leadership race as meaningful.

== Election results ==
=== Party council election results ===
Of the 60 council members elected, 42 were backed by Deniz Baykal while the remaining 18 were backed by either Altan Öymen or Hasan Fehmi Güneş. The members elected to the council, along with the number of votes they received, are shown below.

Members elected to the party council of the Republican People's Party of Turkey, 30 September 2000
İnal Batu 664; Zülfü Livaneli 570; Mahmut yıldız 526; Neşe Korkmaz 514; Veli Aksoy 513; Sinan Yerlikaya 499; Mehmet Ali Özpolat 496; Cevdet Selvi 486; Haluk Özdalga 484; Yakup Kepenek 479; Malik Ecder Özdemir 473; Necmi Yağızer 471	İzzet Çetin 467; Mustafa Gazalcı 466; Önder Sav 464; Ali Rıza Gülçiçek 460; Ali Dinçer 459; Yılmaz Ateş 457; Güldal Okuducu 456; Oya Araslı 453; Algan Hacaloğlu 450; Nurettin Sözen 446; Muzaffer Önder 442; Aykut Oray 441	Mehmet Sevigen 439; Murat Karayalçın 438; Enis Tütüncü 438; Erdal Kalkan 436; Bülent Baratalı 429; Berhan Şimşek 427; Ahmet Güryüz Ketenci 423; Ali Marım 418; Mesut Değer 412; Eşref Erdem 406; Sadullah Usumi 405; Ziya Halis 404	Türkan Miçooğulları 404; Mehmet Yula 404; Yiğit Gülöksüz 402; Emre Kongar 401; Ali Kemal Kumkumoğlu 401; Deniz Pınar Atılgan 400; Fuat Çay 400; Gaye Erbatur 400; Kemal Nebioğlu 399; Haluk Koç 398; Zekeriya Akıncı 396; Halil Çulhaoğlu 396	Sevgi Kökbudak 392; Mehmet Moğultay 392; Esat Canan 388; Yüksel Çakmur 388; Nazlı Eray 374; Semra Aksakal 361; Yaşar Seyman 359; Sunter Özyürek 355; Meral Sağır 354; Şenel Uçar 352; Gülseren Alçı 350; Ayten Aydın 343

=== High Disciplinary Board election results ===
15 members were elected to the High Disciplinary Board. The elected members and the number of votes they received are as follows.

- Ali Şahin 538
- Cumali Kar 536
- Engin Baba 513
- Şehriban Ercan 464
- A. İsmet Çanakçı 399
- Saniye Gül Barut 395
- Satılmış Çağlar 393
- Kemal Demirel 387
- Neriman Genç 374
- Hüseyin Değerli 369
- Alper Karcıoğlu 361
- Ersoy Bulut 353
- Bediha Söylemez 352
- Ali Kemal Deveciler 352
- Şevket Yazkan 342

=== Party leadership election results ===
The party leadership election was held in three rounds, with a new round being called if no candidate was able to win more than 521 votes.

Candidate	First round		Second round		Third round	
Candidate	Votes	%	Votes	%	Votes	%
Deniz Baykal	472	47.5	510	54.0	543	59.5
Altan Öymen	280	28.2	369	39.1	355	38.9
Hasan Fehmi Güneş	190	19.1	62	6.6	12	1.3
Sefa Sirmen	52	5.2	3	0.3	3	0.3
Total	994	100.0	944	100.0	913	100.0
Source: NTV
