= Limanköy, Çayeli =

Limanköy
- Neighbourhood
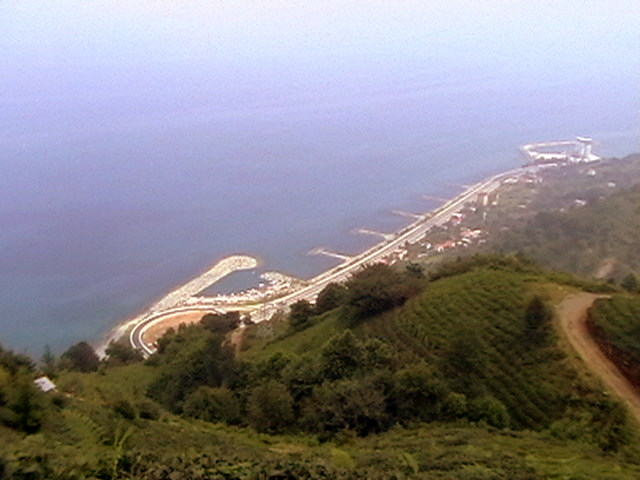

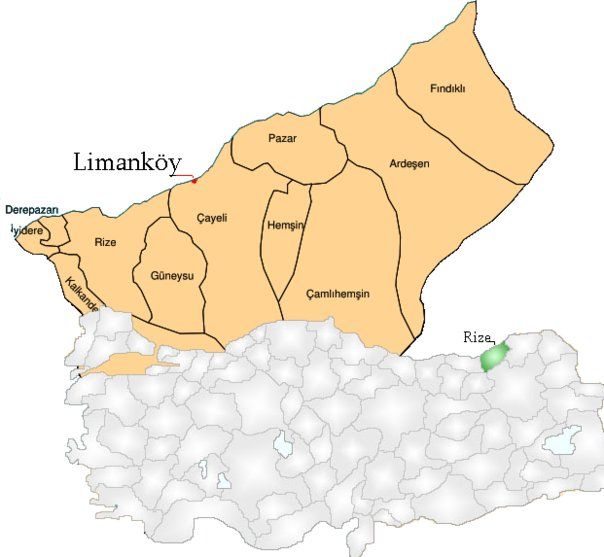

- Location within Turkey
- Coordinates: 41°04′N 40°41′E
- Country: Turkey
- Province: Rize
- District: Çayeli
- Municipality: Çayeli
- Area: 4 km^{2} (1.5 sq mi)
- Population (2021): 885
  - Density: 220/km^{2} (570/sq mi)
- Time zone: UTC+3 (TRT)
- Area code: 0464 532

Limanköy is a neighbourhood of the town Çayeli, Çayeli District, Rize Province, northeastern Turkey. Its population is 885 (2021).

== Infrastructure ==
Limanköy consists of two boathouses, a harbor, two swimming areas, and a beach. Next to the coast is a highway, which stretches for 2.5 km (1.5 miles). Three mosques are there: the Hamuda, Merkez, and Darlik Mosques.

== Etymology ==
Limanköy was formerly known as Artotil during the Ottoman Empire. In present-day it is referred to as Limanköy, which means port village. It is also argued that Limanköy transformed from Liman-Koy, which means bay-port.

Turkish	Ottoman Turkish	English
Liman	ليمان	(the) Port
Koy	كوي	bay (geography)

== Geography ==
Blue Sky and Green Earth

It is situated six kilometers West of central Cayeli, lying east of Büyük Caferpaşa and south of Demirhisar and Akpınar, Kırşehir.

Limanköy consists of a narrow coastal strip and a large mountain area that rises steeply and runs parallel to the coast. Hill Jandarma (Jandarmağun Tepe) is the highest point, at 420 metres. The countryside is covered with unspoiled forest.

== History ==
Mapavri has been historically inhabited by the Laz community, a minority in Turkey. It was a part of the Roman Empire and subsequently the Empire of Trebizond until it was taken over by the Ottoman Empire under Mehmet II in 1461.

Limanköy was considered a remote region with high rates of poverty. As a result, many generations migrated from Limanköy to larger cities in Turkey and to other countries in search of better opportunities and employment prospects. These waves of immigration slowed down when tea was widely planted in Limanköy in the 1940s.

== Community ==
The local economy is mainly dependent on tea-growing. People also grow corn and kiwi. Most of the people who currently live in Limanköy are retirees.

Limanköy is famous for its hawks (Atmaca). In the summer, people sometimes hunt hawks with birds.

The literacy rate of the town is 100%. A lot of Turkish parliament members and many successful businessmen were from Limankoy.

The Bike Competition of Limanköy - Map and Elevation
