= Çayeli mine =

Copper mine in Turkey

- Location within Turkey
- Location: Çayeli, Rize Province, Turkey; 41°5′9.92″N 40°43′19.67″E (approximate)
- Products: Copper
- Opened: 1966
- Company: Cengiz İnşaat, part of Cengiz Holding; Previously First Quantum Minerals
- Website: www.cayelibakir.com
- Acquired: 2026

Çayeli Mine is a large mine in the east of Türkiye in Rize Province, 470 kilometres east of the capital, Ankara. Çayeli represents one of the largest copper reserves in Türkiye, having estimated reserves of 2.6 million tonnes of ore grading 2.32% copper. The 20 million tonnes of ore contains 500,000 tonnes of copper metal.

The mine was previously owned by First Quantum Minerals but was sold to Cengiz İnşaat in Q2 2026.
