= Haremtepe =

Haremtepe Checheva (Laz language)
- Village
- Location in Turkey
- Coordinates: 41°01′50″N 40°44′01″E
- Country: Turkey
- Province: Rize
- District: Çayeli
- Elevation: 508 m (1,667 ft)
- Population (2021): 668
- Time zone: UTC+3 (TRT)

Haremtepe is a village in the Çayeli District, Rize Province, in the Black Sea Region of Turkey. Its population is 668 (2021).

== History ==
According to list of villages in Laz language book (2009), name of the village is Checheva.

== Geography ==
The village is located 6 kilometres (3.7 mi) away from Çayeli.
