= Taşpınar, Rize =

Taşpınar Conceva (Laz language)
- Village
- Country: Turkey
- Province: Rize
- District: Rize
- Elevation: 385 m (1,263 ft)
- Population (2021): 342
- Time zone: UTC+3 (TRT)

Taşpınar or Concik is a village in the Rize District, Rize Province, in Black Sea Region of Turkey. Its population is 342 (2021).

== History ==
According to list of villages in Laz language book (2009), name of the village is Conceva.

== Geography ==
The village is located 18 kilometres (11 mi) away from Rize.
