= 2004 Turkish local elections =

- March 28, 2004

All 16 metropolitan and 3,193 district municipal mayors of Turkey All 3,208 provincial and 34,477 municipal councillors of Turkey
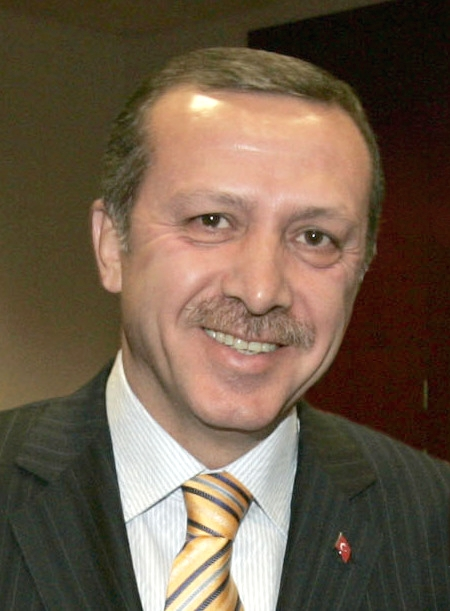

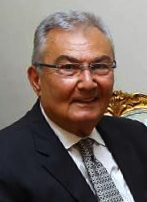

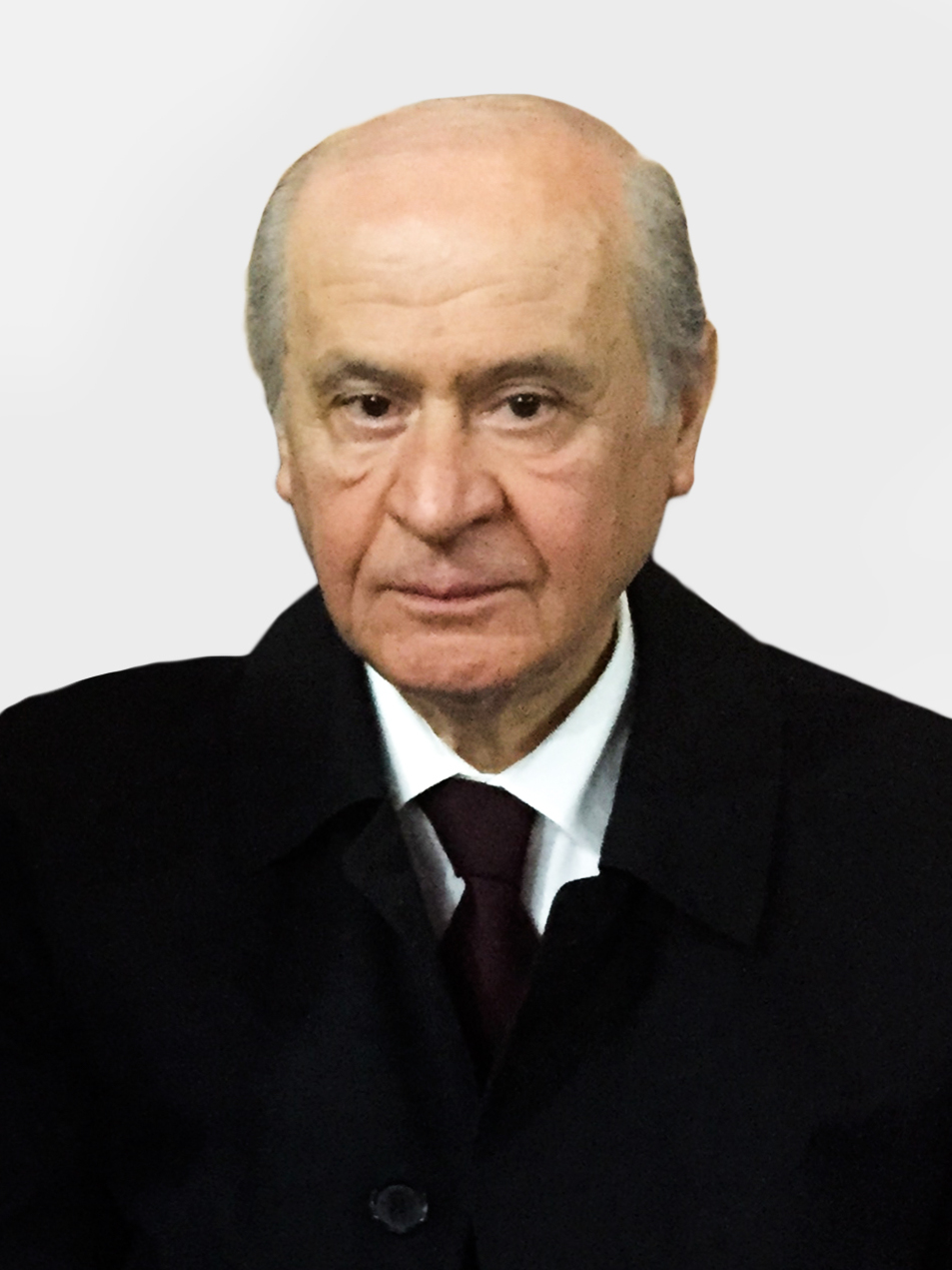
	Majority party	Minority party	Third party
Leader	Recep Tayyip Erdoğan	Deniz Baykal	Devlet Bahçeli
Party	AK Party	CHP	MHP
Leader since	14 August 2001	30 September 2000	6 July 1997
Last election	New party	373 mayors, 11.08%	247 mayors, 3,579 councillors, 10.45%
Mayors	1,762	469	247
Councillors	18,913	6,023	3,579
Popular vote^	13,477,287	5,882,810	3,372,249
Percentage	41.67%	18.23%	10.45%
Swing	▲41.67%	▲7.15%	▼6.72%
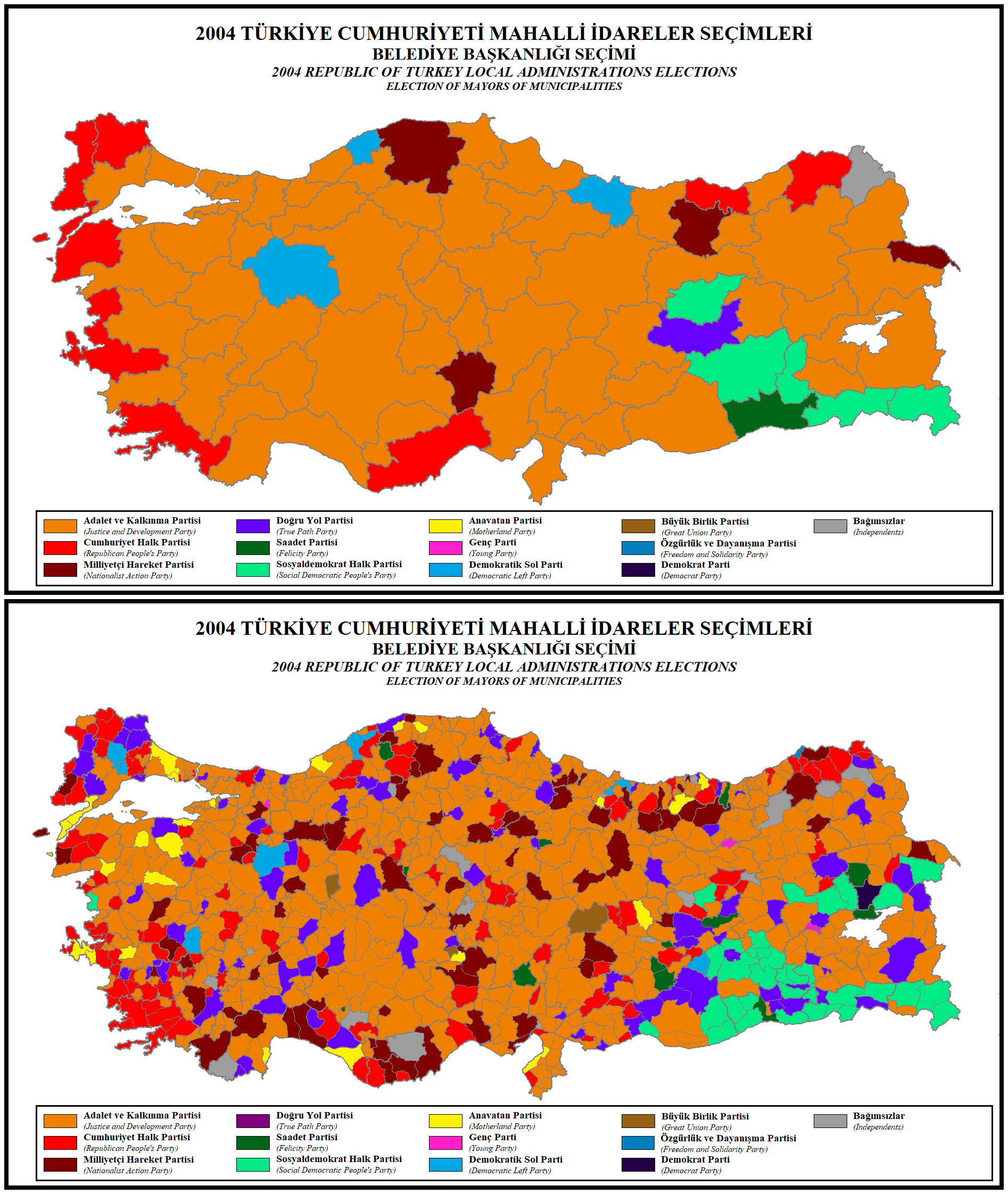
- Results map showing the winners of the 81 provincial capitals of Turkey by party.^ Four different elections in order to elect both types of councillor and mayor were held on the same day. The results shown here are the provincial councillor election results, which best reflect the overall voting intentions of the electorate. See the results section for the full results.

The Turkish local elections of 2004 were held throughout the eighty-one Provinces of Turkey on 28 March 2004 in order to elect both mayors and councillors to local government positions. All 16 metropolitan and 3,193 district municipalities were up for election, while 3,208 provincial and 34,477 municipal councillors were also elected. More than 50,000 neighbourhood presidents (muhtars) were also elected, though these do not have any political affiliations.

With almost 42 percent of votes across the country, the ruling AKP increased the 34 percent it won in the 2002 national parliamentary elections by an extra 8 percent. The only opposition party with representation in Parliament, the Kemalist Republican People's Party (CHP), received 19 percent of the votes. The traditional parties of the Turkish establishment lost further ground. The Nationalist Movement Party (MHP), despite suffering a loss of 6% in their popular vote share, won above 10% of the votes. This bode well for their 2007 general election prospects, since 10% is the election threshold needed to win seats in Parliament.

In the event, the CHP was only able to maintain a degree of support in the provincial regions on the Turkish west coast. Among the four major cities the party was only able to win İzmir, with the AKP winning a majority in the cities of Istanbul, Adana and the Turkish capital, Ankara. The AKP also took the tourist centre Antalya, where the head of the CHP, Deniz Baykal, was the party's candidate.

The main political arm of the Kurdish nationalist movement, the Democratic People's Party (DEHAP), entered these elections in a coalition with five small socialist parties, yet together these parties received fewer votes (5 percent) than the DEHAP received alone in the 2002 elections (6.1 percent).

== Results ==
=== Provincial assemblies ===
Party	Votes	%	Seats
Justice and Development Party	13,447,287	41.67	2,276
Republican People's Party	5,882,810	18.23	392
Nationalist Movement Party	3,372,249	10.45	178
True Path Party	3,216,213	9.97	156
Social Democratic People's Party	1,662,280	5.15	129
Felicity Party	1,297,681	4.02	19
Young Party	839,856	2.60	4
Motherland Party	807,761	2.50	26
Democratic Left Party	683,266	2.12	9
Great Unity Party	374,125	1.16	7
Independent Turkey Party	154,495	0.48	0
Communist Party of Turkey	85,178	0.26	0
Workers' Party	79,774	0.25	0
New Turkey Party	79,584	0.25	0
Labour Party	18,695	0.06	1
Freedom and Solidarity Party	12,379	0.04	0
Nation Party	8,711	0.03	0
Democratic Party	7,837	0.02	2
Bright Turkey Party	3,872	0.01	0
Independents	234,443	0.73	9
**Total**	**32,268,496**	**100.00**	**3,208**
Valid votes	32,268,496	97.16	
Invalid/blank votes	942,961	2.84	
Total votes	**33,211,457**	**100.00**	
Registered voters/turnout	43,552,931	76.26	
Source: Supreme Election Council

==== By province ====
Metropolitan provinces are in bold. AKP denotes provinces won by the Justice & Development Party, CHP denotes provinces won by the Republican People's Party, MHP denotes provinces won by the Nationalist Movement Party, DSP denotes provinces won by the Democratic Left Party, DYP denotes provinces won by the True Path Party and SP denotes provinces won by the Felicity Party.

Province	Party
**Adana**	AKP
Adıyaman	AKP
Afyonkarahisar	AKP
Ağrı	AKP
Amasya	AKP
**Ankara**	AKP
**Antalya**	AKP
Artvin	CHP
Aydın	AKP
Balıkesir	AKP
Bilecik	AKP
Bingöl	AKP
Bitlis	AKP
Bolu	AKP
Burdur	AKP
**Bursa**	AKP
Çanakkale	CHP

Province	Party
Çankırı	AKP
Çorum	AKP
Denizli	AKP
**Diyarbakır**	DGB
Edirne	CHP
Elazığ	DYP
Erzincan	AKP
**Erzurum**	AKP
**Eskişehir**	DSP
**Gaziantep**	AKP
Giresun	AKP
Gümüşhane	MHP
Hakkâri	DGB
Hatay	AKP
Isparta	AKP
**Mersin**	CHP
**Istanbul**	AKP

Province	Party
**İzmir**	CHP
Kars	AKP
Kastamonu	MHP
**Kayseri**	AKP
Kırklareli	CHP
Kırşehir	AKP
**Kocaeli**	AKP
**Konya**	AKP
Kütahya	AKP
Malatya	AKP
Manisa	AKP
Kahramanmaraş	AKP
Mardin	SP
Muğla	CHP
Muş	AKP
Nevşehir	AKP
Niğde	MHP

Province	Party
Ordu	DSP
Rize	AKP
**Sakarya**	AKP
**Samsun**	AKP
Siirt	AKP
Sinop	AKP
Sivas	AKP
Tekirdağ	AKP
Tokat	AKP
Trabzon	CHP
Tunceli	DGB
Şanlıurfa	AKP
Uşak	AKP
Van	AKP
Yozgat	AKP
Zonguldak	AKP
Aksaray	AKP

Province	Party
Bayburt	AKP
Karaman	AKP
Kırıkkale	AKP
Batman	DGB
Şırnak	DGB
Bartın	DSP
Ardahan	IND.
Iğdır	MHP
Yalova	AKP
Karabük	AKP
Kilis	AKP
Osmaniye	AKP
Düzce	AKP
