= Çaycılar, Rize =

Çaycılar Xacavet (Laz language)
- Village
- Location in Turkey
- Coordinates: 40°59′22″N 40°28′12″E
- Country: Turkey
- Province: Rize
- District: Rize
- Elevation: 277 m (909 ft)
- Population (2021): 281
- Time zone: UTC+3 (TRT)

Çaycılar is a village in the Rize District, Rize Province, in Black Sea Region of Turkey. Its population is 281 (2021).

== History ==
According to list of villages in Laz language book (2009), name of the village is Xacavet.

== Geography ==
The village is located 10 kilometres (6.2 mi) away from Rize.
