= Rize District =

District of Rize Province, Turkey

- District
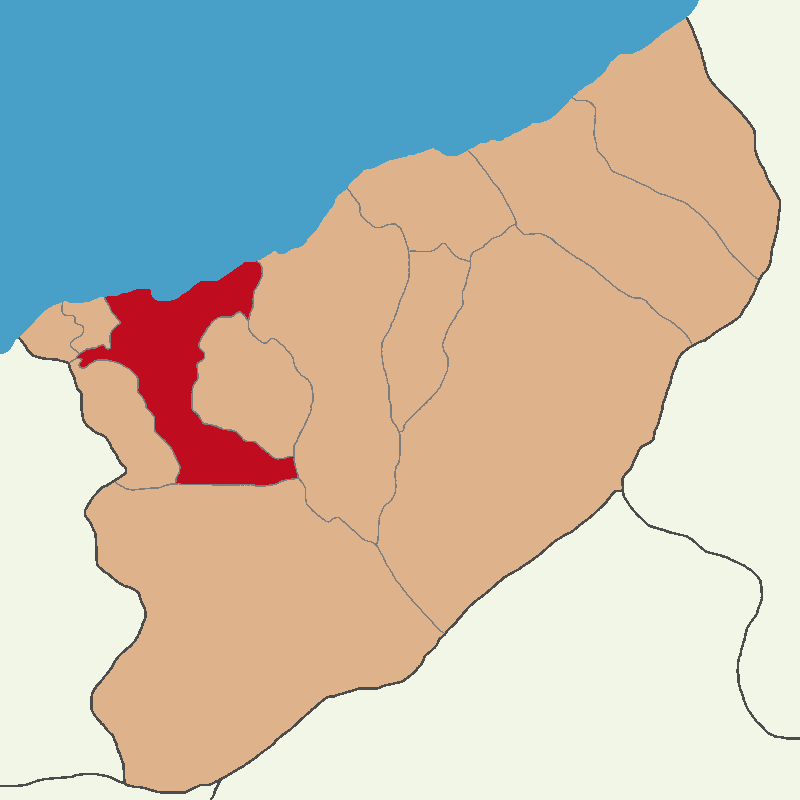
- Map showing Rize District in Rize Province

- Location in Turkey
- Coordinates: 41°01′N 40°31′E
- Country: Turkey
- Province: Rize
- Seat: Rize
- Area: 253 km^{2} (98 sq mi)
- Population (2021): 150,414
  - Density: 595/km^{2} (1,540/sq mi)
- Time zone: UTC+3 (TRT)

Rize District (also: Merkez, meaning "central") is a district of the Rize Province of Turkey. Its seat is the city of Rize. Its area is 253 km^{2}, and its population is 150,414 (2021).

== Composition ==
There are four municipalities in Rize District:

- Kendirli
- Muradiye
- Rize
- Salarha

There are 60 villages in Rize District:

- Akarsu
- Akpınar
- Aktaş
- Ambarlık
- Ayane
- Azaklıhoca
- Balıkçılar
- Beştepe
- Bıldırcınköy
- Boğaz
- Camidağı
- Çaybaşı
- Çaycılar
- Çimenli
- Derebaşı
- Dörtyol
- Düzköy
- Elmalı
- Erenköy
- Gölgeli
- Güzelköy
- Güzelyurt
- Karasu
- Karayemiş
- Ketenli
- Kırklartepesi
- Kocatepe
- Köprülü
- Küçükçayır
- Küçükköy
- Kurtuluş
- Melek
- Ortapazar
- Örnek
- Pazarköy
- Pekmezli
- Pınarbaşı
- Selimiye
- Soğukçeşme
- Söğütlü
- Sütlüce
- Taşköprü
- Taşlık
- Taşpınar
- Tekke
- Topkaya
- Tuğlalı
- Üçkaya
- Uzunköy
- Veliköy
- Yemişlik
- Yenidoğan
- Yenigüzel
- Yenikale
- Yenikasarcılar
- Yeniselimiye
- Yeşildere
- Yolüstü
- Yolveren
- Zincirliköprü
