= Kırklartepesi =

Kırklartepesi Kandeva (Laz language)
- Village
- Location in Turkey
- Coordinates: 40°57′43″N 40°30′08″E
- Country: Turkey
- Province: Rize
- District: Rize
- Elevation: 508 m (1,667 ft)
- Population (2021): 200
- Time zone: UTC+3 (TRT)

Kırklartepesi is a village in the Rize District, Rize Province, in Black Sea Region of Turkey. Its population is 200 (2021).

== History ==
According to list of villages in Laz language book (2009), name of the village is Kandeva.

== Geography ==
The village is located 19 kilometres (12 mi) away from Rize.
