= Hasan Fehmi Güneş =

Turkish jurist and politician (1934–2021)

Minister of Interior
- In office 13 January 1979 – 5 October 1979
- Prime Minister: Bülent Ecevit

Personal details
- Born: 1934 Adapazarı
- Died: 23 November 2021 (aged 86–87) Ankara
- Resting place: Karapürçek, Sakarya
- Party: Republican People's Party
- Other political affiliations: Social Democratic Populist Party
- Children: 2
- Education: Ankara University

Hasan Fehmi Güneş (1934 – 23 November 2021) was a Turkish jurist and politician who served as the interior minister in 1979. He was a member of the Turkish parliament for two terms from the Republican People's Party. Between 1975 and 1980 he served in the Turkish Senate.

== Biography ==
Güneş was born in Adapazarı in 1934. He graduated from Ankara University receiving a bachelor's degree in law. After working as a lawyer and public prosecutor, he entered politics and became senator in the period 1975–1980. On 13 January 1979 he was appointed interior minister to the cabinet led by Prime Minister Bülent Ecevit. His term witnessed significant events, including the assassination of journalist Abdi İpekçi, arrest of the assassin, Mehmet Ali Ağca, and attack by the members of the Palestine Liberation Organization against the Egyptian Embassy in Ankara. He resigned from the office in late September 1979 following the media reports about his affair with an actress.

Güneş was a member of the Turkish parliament in the 18th and 22nd terms. He was elected to the Parliament in the 1987 general election from the Social Democratic Populist Party. He run for the presidency of the Republican People's Party on 30 September 2000, but he lost the election to Deniz Baykal.

Güneş was married and had two children. He died in Ankara on 23 November 2021. He was buried in his hometown, Karapürçek, Sakarya, on 25 November.
