= Leader of the Republican People's Party =

List of Turkish politicians

- Cumhuriyet Halk Partisi Başkanı

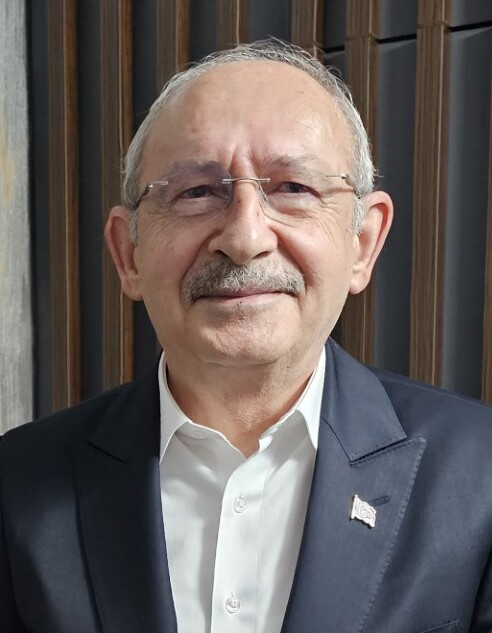
- Incumbent; Kemal Kılıçdaroğlu since 21 May 2026
- Status: Acting, Appointed
- Member of: Party Congress; Central Management Board; Party Convention
- Appointer: Party Convention
- Term length: Two years, renewable
- Formation: 9 September 1923
- First holder: Mustafa Kemal Atatürk
- Deputy: Deputy Leader

The Leader of the Republican People's Party (Turkish: Cumhuriyet Halk Partisi Genel Başkanı) is the leader of the Republican People's Party (CHP), the main opposition party in Turkey. Kemal Kılıçdaroğlu has been the leader between 2010-2023, and again since 21 May 2026, following the deposition of Özgür Özel.

The CHP leader is elected by a majority vote during a convention of the CHP. According to the regulations of the CHP, the CHP leader is the head of all party organizations except disciplinary ones.

== List ==
No.	Name (Born–Died)	Portrait	Term in Office	
1	Mustafa Kemal Atatürk (1881–1938)	Mustafa Kemal Atatürk	9 September 1923	10 November 1938
2	İsmet İnönü (1884–1973)	İsmet İnönü	26 December 1938	8 May 1972
3	Bülent Ecevit (1925–2006)	Bülent Ecevit	14 May 1972	30 October 1980
Party closed down following the 12 September 1980 coup d'état
4	Deniz Baykal (1938–2023)	Deniz Baykal	9 September 1992	18 February 1995
5	Hikmet Çetin (1937–)	Hikmet Çetin	18 February 1995	9 September 1995
(4)	Deniz Baykal (1938–2023)	Deniz Baykal	9 September 1995	23 May 1999
6	Altan Öymen (1932–2025)	Altan Öymen	23 May 1999	30 September 2000
(4)	Deniz Baykal (1938–2023)	Deniz Baykal	30 September 2000	10 May 2010
7	Kemal Kılıçdaroğlu (1948–)	Kemal Kılıçdaroğlu	22 May 2010	5 November 2023
8	Özgür Özel (1974–)	Özgür Özel	5 November 2023	21 May 2026
(7)	Kemal Kılıçdaroğlu (1948–)		21 May 2026	Incumbent
