= Üçkaya, Rize =

Üçkaya Oma Toxli (Laz language)
- Village
- Country: Turkey
- Province: Rize
- District: Rize
- Elevation: 508 m (1,667 ft)
- Population (2021): 282
- Time zone: UTC+3 (TRT)

Üçkaya is a village in the Rize District, Rize Province, in Black Sea Region of Turkey. Its population is 282 (2021).

== History ==
According to list of villages in Laz language book (2009), name of the village is Oma Toxli.

== Geography ==
The village is located 10 kilometres (6.2 mi) away from Rize.
