= Yusuf Kurçenli =

- Born: 1947; Çayeli, Rize, Turkey
- Died: 22 February 2012 (aged 65); Istanbul, Turkey
- Occupation(s): Film director, producer, screenwriter
- Years active: 1977–2010

Yusuf Kurçenli (1947 – 22 February 2012) was a Turkish film director, producer and screenwriter.

== Biography ==
Kurçenli was born in Çayeli, Rize Province, Turkey. He studied journalism at Istanbul University. Between 1973 and 1980, he worked as a director and producer at TRT, the Turkish public television. His debut film was Ve Recep Ve Zehra Ve Ayşe in 1983. He followed that with many long features including the celebrated 1994 film Çözülmeler that won many awards at film festivals. He also directed Baba Evi and Kurşun Kalem. His last film was Yüreğine Sor. He was diagnosed with cancer the same year and died in Istanbul aged 65, after having been ailing from the disease for one-and-a-half years.

== Awards ==
- 1990: "Best Film" at the 9th Istanbul Film Festival
- 1994: "best Director" at the 13th Istanbul Film Festival for Çözülmeler
- 1994: "Best Film" at the 16th Turkish Film Writers Awards for Çözülmeler
- 1995: "Best Director" and "Best Original Screenplay" at the 7th Ankara Film Festival for Çözülmeler

== Filmography ==
=== Director ===
- 1977: Özgürlüğün Bedeli
- 1978: At Gözlüğü
- 1979: Savunma
- 1983: Ve Recep Ve Zehra Ve Ayşe
- 1984: Ölmez Ağacı
- 1986: Merdoğlu Ömer Bey
- 1987: Gramofon Avrat
- 1989: Gönül Garip Bir Kuştur
- 1990: Raziye
- 1990: Karartma Geceleri
- 1992: Taşların Sırrı
- 1993: Umut Taksi
- 1994: Çözülmeler 1994
- 1995: Aşk Üzerine Söylenmemiş Her şey
- 1997: Antika Talanı
- 1999: Baba Evi
- 2000: Çemberler
- 2000: Kurşun Kalem
- 2002: Gönderilmemiş Mektuplar
- 2006: Bebeğim
- 2008: Gurbet Kuşları
- 2010: Yüreğine Sor

=== Producer ===
- 1994: Çözülmeler

=== Screenwriter ===
- 1979: Savunma
- 1983: Ve Recep Ve Zehra Ve Ayşe
- 1984: Ölmez Ağacı
- 1986: Merdoğlu Ömer Bey
- 1987: Gramofon Avrat
- 1989: Gönül Garip Bir Kuştur
- 1990: Karartma Geceleri
- 1990: Raziye
- 1994: Çözülmeler
- 1995: Aşk Üzerine Söylenmemiş Her şey
- 2002: Gönderilmemiş Mektuplar
