= Çayeli District =

District of Rize Province, Turkey

- District
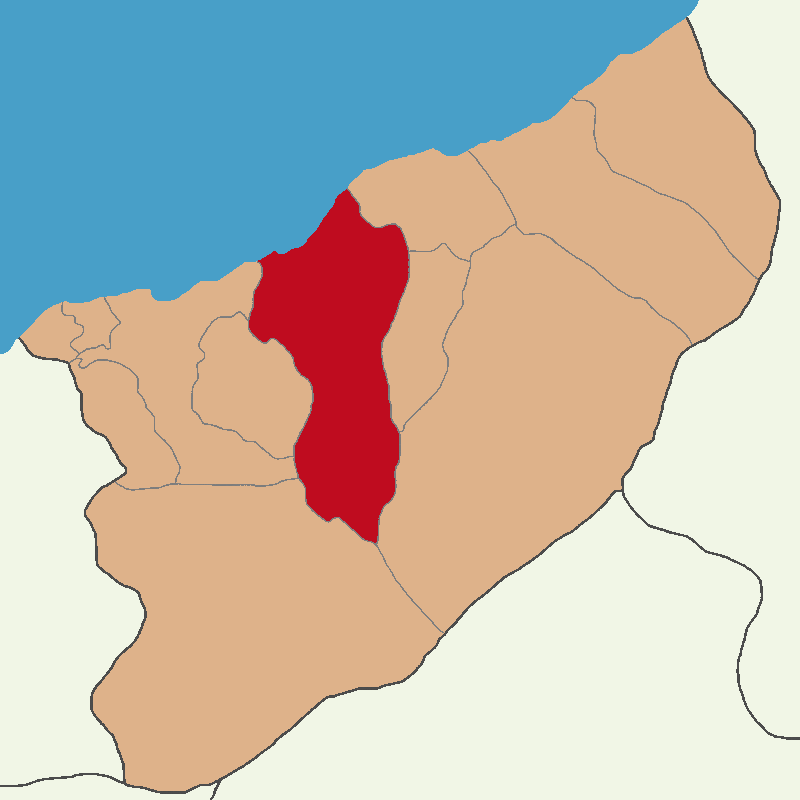
- Map showing Çayeli District in Rize Province

- Location in Turkey
- Coordinates: 40°45′N 41°04′E
- Country: Turkey
- Province: Rize
- Seat: Çayeli

Government
  - Kaymakam: Muhammet Fatih Demirel
- Area: 442 km^{2} (171 sq mi)
- Population (2021): 43,478
  - Density: 98/km^{2} (250/sq mi)
- Time zone: UTC+3 (TRT)
- Website: www.cayeli.gov.tr

Çayeli District is a district of the Rize Province of Turkey. Its seat is the town of Çayeli. Its area is 442 km^{2}, and its population is 43,478 (2021).

== Composition ==
There are three municipalities in Çayeli District:

- Büyükköy
- Çayeli
- Madenli

There are 52 villages in Çayeli District:

- Abdullahhoca
- Armutlu
- Aşıklar
- Başköy
- Beşikçiler
- Beyazsu
- Buzlupınar
- Çataldere
- Çeşmeli
- Çınartepe
- Çilingir
- Çukurluhoca
- Demirhisar
- Derecik
- Düzgeçit
- Erdemli
- Erenler
- Esendağ
- Gemiciler
- Gürgenli
- Gürpınar
- Güzeltepe
- Haremtepe
- Incesu
- Kaçkar
- Kaptanpaşa
- Karaağaç
- Kemerköy
- Kestanelik
- Köprübaşı
- Latifli
- Maltepe
- Musadağı
- Ormancık
- Ortaköy
- Sarısu
- Sefalı
- Selimiye
- Sırtköy
- Şirinköy
- Uzundere
- Yamaçköy
- Yanıkdağ
- Yavuzlar
- Yenice
- Yenihisar
- Yenitepe
- Yeşilırmak
- Yeşilköy
- Yeşiltepe
- Yıldızeli
- Zafer
