= Altan Öymen =

Turkish journalist, author and politician (1932–2025)

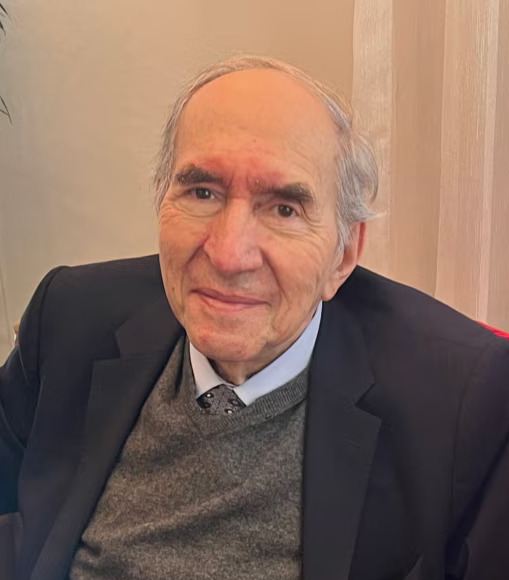
- Öymen in 2024

Leader of the Republican People's Party
- In office 23 May 1999 – 30 September 2000
- Preceded by: Deniz Baykal
- Succeeded by: Deniz Baykal

Minister of Tourism and Promotion
- In office 21 June 1977 – 21 July 1977
- Prime Minister: Bülent Ecevit
- Preceded by: Nahit Menteşe
- Succeeded by: İskender Cenap Ege

Member of the Grand National Assembly
- In office 24 December 1995 – 18 April 1999
- Constituency: İstanbul (1995)
- In office 5 June 1977 – 12 September 1980
- Constituency: Ankara (1977)

Personal details
- Born: 20 June 1932 Istanbul, Turkey
- Died: 19 July 2025 (aged 93) Şişli, Istanbul, Turkey
- Party: Republican People's Party
- Occupation: Politician, journalist, author

Mehmet Altan Öymen (20 June 1932 – 19 July 2025) was a Turkish journalist, author and politician.

== Life and career ==
Öymen was born on 20 June 1932 in Istanbul. He completed his secondary education at the Ankara Atatürk High School. He graduated from the School of Political Science of Ankara University. He began his journalism career in 1950 aged 18 and long worked as a reporter, columnist and editor-in-chief for the major newspapers like Ulus, Akşam, Cumhuriyet and Milliyet. He founded the press agency Anka news agency in 1972. In the 1960s, Altan Öymen served as the press attaché in Bonn, Federal Republic of Germany.

He entered politics in 1961 as member of the parliament that was formed after the military coup in Turkey in 1960. He was elected in 1977 as the deputy of Ankara from the Republican People's Party (CHP) to the Turkish Grand National Assembly, and became minister for tourism and public relations in the cabinet of Bülent Ecevit's second government, which lasted only one month in the summer 1977. He was reelected in 1995 as the deputy of Istanbul from the CHP.

Following the resignation of Deniz Baykal from the presidency of CHP, he was elected leader on 23 May 1999. He held this post for 15 months, until Deniz Baykal was reelected at the next extraordinary party congress in 2000.

Öymen resumed his journalism career, which he had interrupted during his party leadership, and wrote on political issues in his column in the newspaper Radikal.

In the 1980s and 1990s, he was awarded several times for his journalism.

Öymen died of multiple organ failure in Şişli, Istanbul, on 19 July 2025, at the age of 93. On 22 July 2025, after the official ceremony at the Grand National Assembly and the funeral prayer at Teşvikiye Mosque, he was interred in his family's plot at the Zincirlikuyu Cemetery in Istanbul.

== Bibliography ==
- Mobilya Dosyası (The Furniture File), um:ag Press (1997), with Uğur Mumcu, 300p., ISBN 975-8084-28-3
- Bir Dönem Bir Çocuk (One Era One Child), Doğan Press (2002), 606 p., ISBN 975-293-040-9
- Değişim Yılları (The Transition Times), Doğan Press (2004), 670 p., ISBN 975-293-255-X
- Öfkeli Yıllar (The Angry Years), Doğan Press (2009) 608 pg., ISBN 978-605-111-401-9
- ... ve İhtilal, Doğan Press (2013) 754 pg., ISBN 978-605-09-1758-1
- Umutlar ve İdamlar, Doğan Press (2018) 447 pg., ISBN 978-605-09-5206-3
- Kayıp Yaz, Doğan Press (2016) 329 pg., ISBN 978-605-09-3865-4

== Notes ==
Party political offices
Preceded by Deniz Baykal	Leader of the Republican People's Party; 1999–2000	Succeeded by Deniz Baykal
