= Kendirli =

- Municipality
- Location in Turkey
- Coordinates: 40°58′24″N 40°25′42″E
- Country: Turkey
- Province: Rize
- District: Rize
- Population (2021): 3,088
- Time zone: UTC+3 (TRT)

Kendirli is a town (belde) in the Rize District, Rize Province, Turkey. Its population is 3,088 (2021).
