= Salarha =

Salarha Salarxa (Laz language)
- Municipality
- Location in Turkey
- Coordinates: 40°58′1″N 40°31′53″E
- Country: Turkey
- Province: Rize
- District: Rize
- Elevation: 252 m (827 ft)
- Population (2021): 2,263
- Time zone: UTC+3 (TRT)

Salarha (before 2016: Çaykent) is a town (belde) in the Rize District, Rize Province, Turkey. Its population is 2,263 (2021). Unlike much of the mountainous Rize Province, it is in a relatively flat area.

== History ==
According to list of villages in Laz language book (2009), name of the village is Salarxa.

== Geography ==
The village is located 15 kilometres (9.3 mi) south from Rize.
