= Deniz Baykal =

Turkish politician (1938–2023)

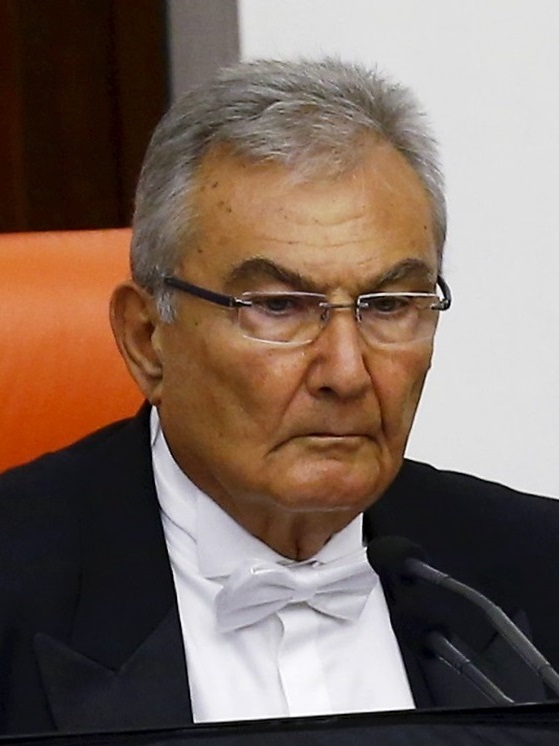
- Baykal in 2015

Speaker of the Grand National Assembly Interim
- In office 17 November 2015 – 22 November 2015
- President: Recep Tayyip Erdoğan
- Preceded by: İsmet Yılmaz
- Succeeded by: İsmail Kahraman
- In office 23 June 2015 – 1 July 2015
- President: Recep Tayyip Erdoğan
- Preceded by: Cemil Çiçek
- Succeeded by: İsmet Yılmaz

Deputy Prime Minister of Turkey
- In office 31 October 1995 – 6 March 1996
- Prime Minister: Tansu Çiller
- Preceded by: Necmettin Cevheri
- Succeeded by: Nahit Menteşe

Leader of the Opposition
- In office 19 November 2002 – 22 May 2010
- Prime Minister: Recep Tayyip Erdoğan; Abdullah Gül
- Preceded by: Tansu Çiller
- Succeeded by: Kemal Kılıçdaroğlu

Minister of Foreign Affairs
- In office 31 October 1995 – 6 March 1996
- Prime Minister: Tansu Çiller
- Preceded by: Ali Coşkun Kırca
- Succeeded by: Emre Gönensay

Vice President of Socialist International
- In office 31 October 2003 – 2 July 2008
- President: António Guterres; George Papandreou
- Country: Turkey
- Preceded by: Erdal İnönü
- Succeeded by: Kemal Kılıçdaroğlu

4th Leader of the Republican People's Party
- In office 30 September 2000 – 10 May 2010
- Preceded by: Altan Öymen
- Succeeded by: Kemal Kılıçdaroğlu
- In office 9 September 1995 – 23 May 1999
- Preceded by: Hikmet Çetin
- Succeeded by: Altan Öymen
- In office 9 September 1992 – 18 February 1995
- Preceded by: Bülent Ecevit
- Succeeded by: Hikmet Çetin

Minister of Energy and Natural Resources
- In office 5 January 1978 – 12 November 1979
- Prime Minister: Bülent Ecevit
- Preceded by: Kamran İnan
- Succeeded by: Ahmet Esat Kıratlıoğlu

Minister of Finance
- In office 26 January 1974 – 17 November 1974
- Prime Minister: Bülent Ecevit
- Preceded by: Sadık Tekin Müftüoğlu
- Succeeded by: Bedri Gürsoy

Member of the Grand National Assembly
- In office 14 November 2002 – 11 February 2023
- Constituency: Antalya (2002, 2007, 2011, June 2015, Nov 2015, 2018)
- In office 14 December 1987 – 18 April 1999
- Constituency: Antalya (1987, 1991, 1995)
- In office 14 October 1973 – 12 September 1980
- Constituency: Antalya (1973, 1977)

Personal details
- Born: 20 July 1938 Antalya, Turkey
- Died: 11 February 2023 (aged 84) Ankara, Turkey
- Resting place: Turkish State Cemetery
- Party: Republican People's Party (1968–1980, 1992–2023); Populist Party/Social Democracy Party (1983–1985); Social Democratic Populist Party (1985–1992)
- Spouse: Olcay Baykal (m. 1963)
- Children: 2
- Education: Ankara University (LLB); UC Berkeley; Columbia University; Mekteb-i Mülkiye (PhD)

Deniz Baykal (20 July 1938 – 11 February 2023) was a Turkish politician, as well as a member of the Republican People's Party (CHP), who served as Deputy Prime Minister and Minister of Foreign Affairs from 1995 to 1996. Having served in numerous government positions, Baykal led the CHP from 1992 to February 1995, from September 1995 to 1999 and again from 2000 to 2010. Between 2002 and 2010, he also served as the Leader of the Opposition by virtue of leading the second largest party in the Parliament.

First elected to Parliament in 1973, Baykal went on to serve as Minister of Finance in the CHP-MSP coalition of 1974 and as Minister of Energy and Natural Resources in the third government of Bülent Ecevit from 1978 to 1979. With the CHP shut down during the 1980 Turkish coup d'état, Baykal was briefly imprisoned before being elected to Parliament once again in 1987 from the new Social Democratic People's Party (SHP).

Baykal was one of the leading members of the re-established CHP, which was founded again in 1992. He served as the party's leader until 1995, when the CHP and SHP merged during a convention. He was re-elected leader in September 1995, after which Baykal contested the 1995 general election and formed a coalition government with Tansu Çiller's True Path Party. He served concurrently as Deputy Prime Minister and Minister of Foreign Affairs between 1995 and 1996. Leading the CHP into a landslide defeat in the 1999 general election, Baykal resigned after the party was entirely ejected from Parliament for failing to surpass the 10% election threshold. Regardless, he was re-elected as leader in 2000 and led the party to a moderate success in the 2002 general election, becoming the Leader of the Opposition.

As the oldest MP in Parliament following the June 2015 general election, Baykal briefly served as the interim Speaker of the Grand National Assembly. He was the CHP's candidate to become the permanent Parliamentary Speaker for the 25th Parliament of Turkey in the June–July 2015 speaker elections, but lost to Justice and Development Party candidate İsmet Yılmaz. Following a breakdown of coalition talks after the election, Baykal was offered a ministerial position in the subsequent interim election government formed by AKP leader Ahmet Davutoğlu, which he turned down in line with the party executive's decision. He became interim parliamentary Speaker for a second time on 17 November 2015 by virtue of being the oldest MP after the November 2015 general election. He was succeeded by the AKP MP İsmail Kahraman, who was elected Speaker on 22 November 2015.

== Early years ==
Baykal was born to Hüseyin Hilmi and Feride in Antalya. He was educated at the University of Ankara Faculty of Law. He later studied at the University of California, Berkeley and Columbia University as a Rockefeller scholar. Following this, he completed his Ph.D. by 1963 at the University of Ankara Faculty of Political Science. He became an associate professor at the same faculty, where he lectured until 1973.

== Political career before 1980 ==
=== Early career ===
Baykal first became involved in politics during the 1950s, having taken part in student movements opposing the Democratic Party (Turkish: Demokrat Parti) government of Adnan Menderes. He was noticed by senior officials of the CHP after writing a detailed analysis of the party's defeat in the 1965 general election, which would form the basis of his academic thesis that he submitted to become a docent. In the 1973 general election, he was elected as a CHP Member of Parliament for Antalya. At the time of his election, he was the youngest MP in Parliament.

=== Minister of Finance, 1974 ===
In the short-lived coalition government of Bülent Ecevit that had been formed with the Islamist National Salvation Party led by Necmettin Erbakan, Baykal become the Minister of Finance. His tenure would last under a year, with the unlikely partnership between the secular-orientated CHP and the Islamist-orientated MSP collapsing in November 1974.

=== Minister of Energy and Natural Resources, 1978-79 ===
Baykal became the Minister of Energy and Natural Resources in the third cabinet of Bülent Ecevit, which lasted from January 1978 to November 1979. The government had a narrow vote of confidence in Parliament due to a loose coalition with independent MPs, the Democratic Party and the Republican Reliance Party. Despite the government maintaining a small majority, the CHP lost ground in the Senate and by-elections held in October 1979, causing Ecevit to resign.

At the same time as serving as Energy and Natural Resources Minister, Baykal was also elected to the CHP Party Council and served as both a Central Executive Committee member and a deputy Secretary General of the party. In the party convention held after the disappointing 1979 senate and by-elections, he was heavily critical of the party's established executive.

== 1980 coup d'état ==
Like many politicians of the 1970s, Baykal was arrested and detained in Ankara, receiving a ban of five years from the military on grounds of political activities. Baykal joined the Social Democracy Party SODEP in 1984. In a constitutional referendum held in 1987, the electorate voted to lift all political bans from the coup-era. As a result, Ecevit, Süleyman Demirel and other key politicians of the pre-1980 era returned to politics alongside Baykal.

== Political career after 1980 ==
=== SHP era, 1987 ===
SODEP merged with the Populist Party (SHP) in 1987 and Baykal was elected again as an MP from Antalya in 1987 general elections. He was elected to the second chair of the Social Democratic Populist Party as the General Secretary in 1988 and served as the party's parliamentary group leader. He stood as General secretary on 10 September 1990, after which he stood against the party's leader Erdal İnönü three times but failed to win on all occasions. He became the leader of the inner-party opposition to the leadership.

During this period, he served as the co-president of the Turkey-European Union inter-parliamentary committee and was a member of the parliamentary foreign policy committee.

=== Re-establishment of the CHP, 1992 ===
In 1992, with the abandonment of laws prohibiting the re-foundation of former political parties, he led a significant movement and re-established the historical Republican People's Party (CHP), which had been closed down by 1980 military regime. He was elected as the leader of the party.

The CHP had entered the 1994 local elections with the political left split between the CHP, SHP and the Democratic Left Party (DSP) of Bülent Ecevit. In a party convention held in February 1995, the CHP formally merged with the SHP, while the DSP refused to consider a merger. Baykal did not stand for the leadership in this convention, with Hikmet Çetin being elected leader of the newly enlarged CHP instead.

=== Coalition government era ===
Baykal was re-elected as leader of the CHP during a convention in September 1995. He formed a coalition with the True Path Party (DYP), with DYP leader Tansu Çiller as Prime Minister. Baykal subsequently became Deputy Prime Minister and the minister of Foreign Affairs. His one condition for going into coalition was holding an early election, which happened in December 1995. The CHP came fifth with just 10.71% of the vote, and the DYP-CHP coalition lost their majority in Parliament.

Despite their poor election performance, Baykal was reelected as leader during the CHP convention of 27 February 1998. In the 1999 general election, the CHP scored below the 10% election threshold needed to win seats in Parliaments, resulting in all CHP MPs being ejected from the chamber. Baykal subsequently resigned as leader and Altan Öymen was elected in his place. However, he stood again for the leadership against Öymen in the 2000 extraordinary convention, being elected for a third time as CHP leader.

=== Leader of the Opposition, 2002–2010 ===
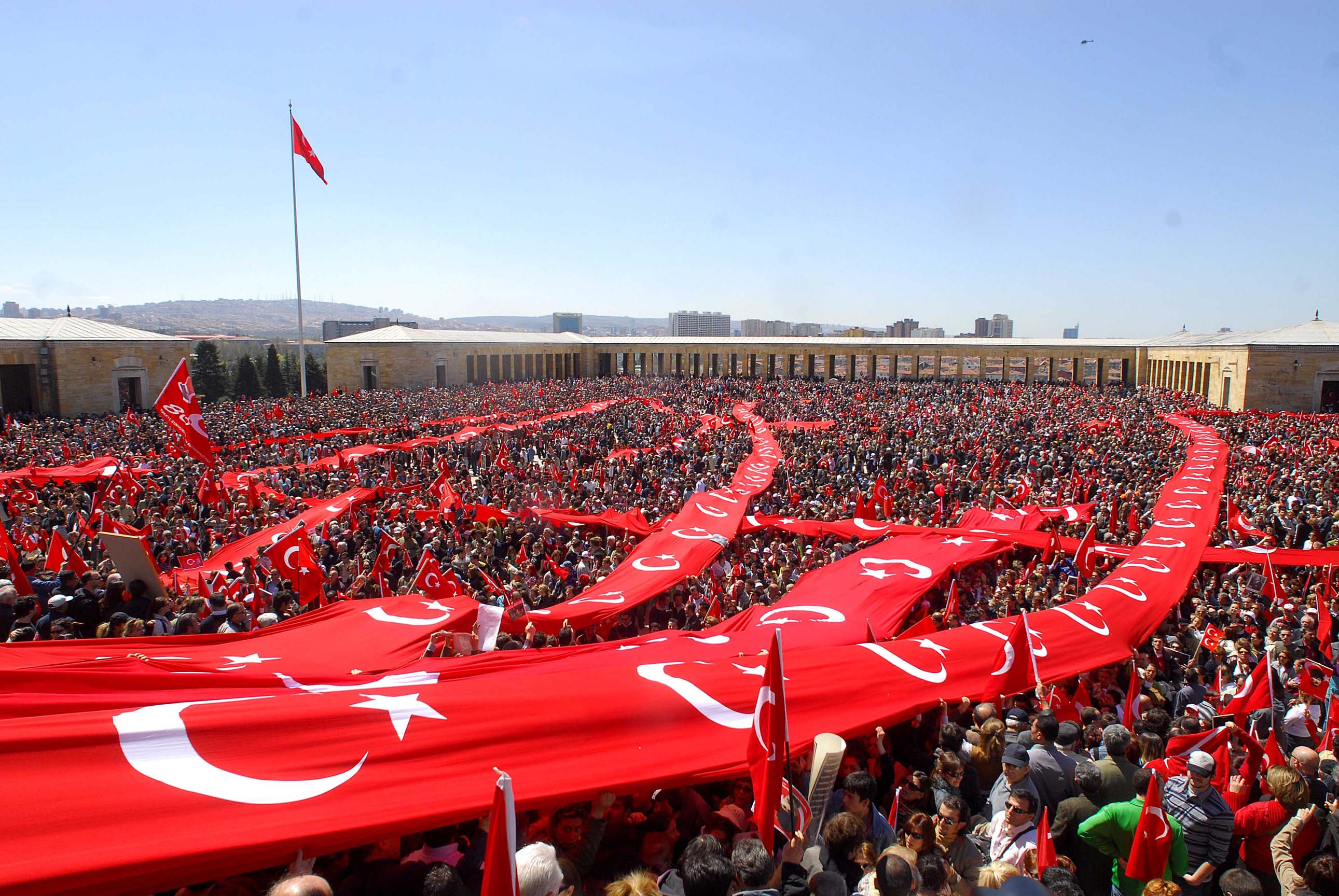
Republic Protests against the presidential candidacy of Abdullah Gül in 2007

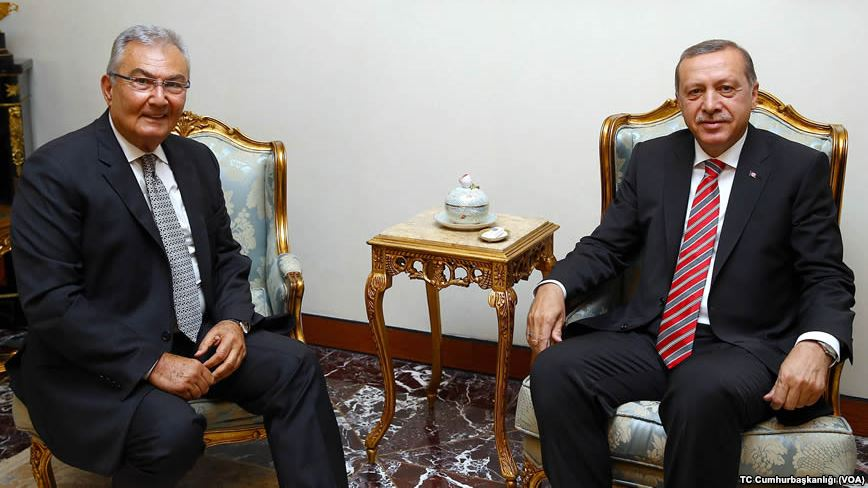
Deniz Baykal meeting President Recep Tayyip Erdoğan in 2015

Baykal led the CHP through the 2002 general election, where the party won 19.38% of the vote and came second. The newly formed Justice and Development Party (AKP), meanwhile, won a landslide majority in Parliament and put an end to years of unstable coalition governments. Baykal subsequently became the leader of the opposition, leading the only opposition party in Parliament. All other parties had fallen short of the 10% boundary, leaving the AKP with 363 and the CHP with 178 seats in the 550-seat Grand National Assembly.

Baykal was instrumental in assisting the AKP change the law in order to allow the party's banned leader, Recep Tayyip Erdoğan, to enter Parliament. Erdoğan had been banned from public office due to religious intolerance, with the AKP needing 367 votes in Parliament to change the law in Erdoğan's favour. The CHP supported the change and Erdoğan was elected to Parliament in a by-election in 2003, subsequently taking over from Abdullah Gül as Prime Minister.

Leading his party through the 2004 local elections, the CHP managed to increase their vote share but lost further ground, losing control of Antalya, Baykal's hometown, to the AKP. As a result, the Mayor of Istanbul's Şişli district, Mustafa Sarıgül, challenged Baykal for the leadership in an extraordinary convention in January 2005. Although Baykal won the election, the convention was marred by violence between supporters of the two opposing candidates, with Sarıgül being expelled from the party afterwards. He first joined the DSP, but later formed the Turkish Change Movement in 2009.

Baykal strongly protested the AKP's nomination of Abdullah Gül as their presidential candidate for the 2007 presidential election, owing to Gül's history in political Islam. The CHP held several Republic protests to rally against the parliamentary process, with CHP MPs boycotting the election process. Due to the 67% quorum needed to elect a President, the AKP was unable to elect Gül without the CHP being in attendance. As a result, an early general election was scheduled for July 2007.

Baykal joined forces in an electoral alliance with the DSP in time for the 2007 general election, though the two parties combined only marginally improving on their 2002 result, winning 20.88% of the vote. Due to the Nationalist Movement Party (MHP) surpassing the 10% threshold, the CHP's seats dropped considerably from 178 to 112. 13 of the 112 MPs were from the DSP, meaning the CHP on its own held 99 MPs in Parliament. However, many DSP MPs joined the CHP after being elected. With the help of the MHP and DSP, Gül was elected President despite also suffering a loss in their share of the seats (down from 363 to 341), as there was a quorum of 67% this time. In January 2009, Baykal criticized the establishing of TRT 6, which broadcast in the Kurdish language as he didn't see a benefit for Turkey if it only addressed the ethnic demands of a certain group.

In 2008, Baykal urged for a strong response to terrorism.

The CHP's moderate vote share increase continued through the 2009 local elections, in which the party won 23.08% of the vote and won back control of Antalya. The AKP lost further ground, most likely due to the 2008 financial crisis occurring a year before the election. Despite presiding over an increase of the CHP's vote share in all elections he contested since 2002, he failed to win any of them.

He resigned from the leadership of CHP on 10 May 2010. This was due to criticism of his private life after an alleged video-tape showing him having sex with his former secretary, and a member of parliament Nesrin Baytok, was leaked to the media. He originally planned to run for the leadership again in the Ordinary Convention of 2010, since many members of the Central Executive Committee insisted that he retake his position as leader. However, with many provincial branch leaders of the CHP endorsing Kemal Kılıçdaroğlu instead, Baykal refused to run for re-election and Kılıçdaroğlu was elected unopposed.

=== Political activities since 2010 ===
Baykal was re-elected as an MP in the 2011 and the June 2015 general election. Since he was the oldest member of the newly elected Parliament after the 2015 election, he became the temporary parliament speaker on 23 June 2015. He was the CHP's candidate to become the permanent Parliamentary Speaker for the 25th Parliament of Turkey. He contested the June–July 2015 speaker elections, but lost to Justice and Development Party candidate İsmet Yılmaz in the final round with 182 votes to Yılmaz's 258 on 1 July 2015.

Baykal was one of the five CHP politicians who were offered ministerial positions by Justice and Development Party leader Ahmet Davutoğlu in August 2015. Davutoğlu had been tasked by President Recep Tayyip Erdoğan to form an interim election government after coalition negotiations proved unsuccessful and resulted in Erdoğan calling an early election. Since the CHP had 131 MPs during the formation of the interim government, the party was entitled to 5 ministries in the cabinet, though Kılıçdaroğlu announced that the CHP would not take part and give up their five ministries to independent politicians. Baykal subsequently declined Davutoğlu's offer, as did the four other CHP MPs that had been offered ministerial positions. His letter of declination was three pages long and was described by himself as an 'equivalent of a historical document'.

Re-elected as an MP in the November 2015 general election, Baykal was once again the oldest MP in the newly elected 26th Parliament of Turkey and subsequently became interim Speaker of the Parliament on 17 November 2015. He was succeeded by İsmail Kahraman, the AKP's candidate for Speaker, who was elected on 22 November 2015 in the third round. The CHP's candidate this time round had been Ayşe Gülsün Bilgehan, the granddaughter of former President İsmet İnönü.

== Personal life and death ==
Baykal died on 11 February 2023, at the age of 84. He was found dead in his bed at 05:00 by his wife Olcay. His daughter Aslı Baykal announced that her father had died due to a heart attack. He was buried in the Turkish State Cemetery in Ankara following the funeral service held at Ahmet Hamdi Akseki Mosque.

== See also ==
- 37th government of Turkey
- 42nd government of Turkey
- 52nd government of Turkey
- Left of Center (Turkey)
- List of members of the Grand National Assembly of Turkey who died in office

Political offices
Preceded by Sadık Tekin Müftüoğlu	Minister of Finance of Turkey; 26 January 1974–November 17, 1974	Succeeded by Bedri Gürsoy
Preceded by Hikmet Çetin	Deputy Prime Minister of Turkey; 30 October 1995–March 6, 1996	Succeeded by Nahit Menteşe
Preceded by Ali Coşkun Kırca	Minister of Foreign Affairs of Turkey; 31 October 1995–March 6, 1996	Succeeded by Emre Gönensay
Preceded by Cemil Çiçek	Speaker of the Parliament of Turkey (acting); 8 June 2015 – 1 July 2015	Succeeded by İsmet Yılmaz
Preceded by İsmet Yılmaz	Speaker of the Parliament of Turkey (acting); 17 November 2015 – 22 November 2015	Succeeded by İsmail Kahraman
Party political offices
Preceded by Bülent Ecevit	Leader of the Republican People's Party; 9 September 1992–February 18, 1995	Succeeded by Hikmet Çetin
Preceded by Hikmet Çetin	Leader of the Republican People's Party; 9 September 1995–April 22, 1999	Succeeded by Altan Öymen
Preceded by Altan Öymen	Leader of the Republican People's Party; 30 September 2000–May 10, 2010	Succeeded by Kemal Kılıçdaroğlu
