= 33rd Republican People's Party Ordinary Convention =

Party election in Turkey

Republican People's Party leadership election, 2010
- 22 May 2010
- Turnout: 99.68% (nominations); 95.76% (election)
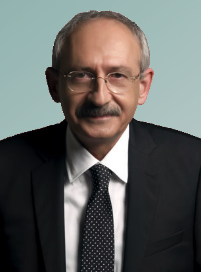
Candidate	Kemal Kılıçdaroğlu
Party	CHP
Constituency	Istanbul
Popular vote	1,189
Percentage	100%
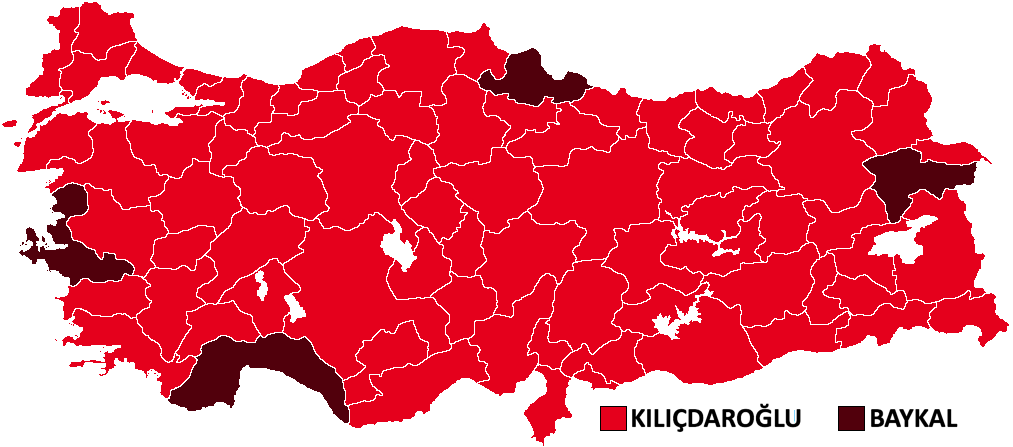
- The endorsements made by the party chairpersons of the 81 provinces of Turkey
Leader before election
Deniz Baykal
CHP
Elected Leader
Kemal Kılıçdaroğlu
CHP

34th Republican People's Party Ordinary Convention
- 22–23 May 2010

Convention leaders
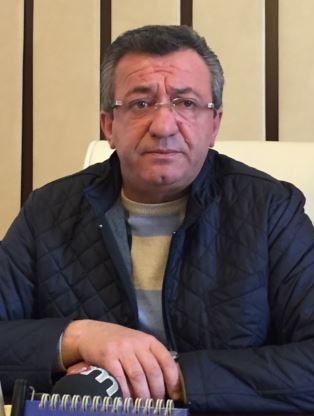
Mehmet Cevdet Selvi
Engin Altay
Party leader (acting)
Genel Başkanvekili
Speaker
Divan Başkanı

Delegates
- Delegates voting: 1,197
- Invalid/blank votes: 8
- Registered delegates: 1,250
- Turnout: 95.8%

Elected positions
Office	Elected
Party leader	1
Party Council	80
High Disciplinary Board	15

Conventions of the Republican People's Party

The 33rd Republican People's Party Ordinary Convention was held on 22 and 23 May 2010 in order to elect a new leader following the resignation of Deniz Baykal after a sex-tape scandal. The only candidate was former CHP parliamentary group leader Kemal Kılıçdaroğlu, who was both nominated and unanimously elected with a record share of the delegates' votes.

Baykal initially had considered re-running for election due to strong support from the party's central executive committee, but the lack of support from the local party association chairpersons resulted in him withdrawing from the leadership race. While Kılıçdaroğlu received the support of 77 out of the 81 provincial chairpersons, Baykal received the endorsement of the remaining four. A total of 1,250 delegates were registered for election, with Kılıçdaroğlu receiving 1,189 (with 8 invalid votes).

== Party council ==
=== Directly elected ===
Members elected to the Party Council are as follows, with the number of votes they received shown in brackets.

- Oya Araslı (1091)
- Necla Arat (1100)
- Metin Arifağaoğlu (1108)
- Yücel Artantaş (1092)
- Deniz Pınar Atılgan (1102)
- Sencer Ayata (1113)
- Işık Bildacı Ayata (1112)
- Enver Aysever (1112)
- Aydan Baran (1111)
- Süheyl Batum (1108)
- Gülsün Bilgehan (1110)
- Tekin Bingöl (1096)
- Mevlüt Coşkuner (1112)
- Behçet Çağlar (1112)
- Asuman Çakmakçı (1110)
- Hikmet Çelik (1098)
- Soner Çetin (1110)
- İzzet Çetin (1097)
- Mesut Değer (1030)
- Mahmut Duyan (1105)
- Didem Engin (1109)
- Nevin Gaye Erbatur (1097)
- Ali Rıza Ertemur (1112)
- Abdurrezzak Erten (1094)
- Mehmet Faraç (1113)
- Neriman Genç (1111)
- İsa Gök (1094)
- Gökhan Günaydın (1100)
- Mehmet Zeki Gündüz (1113)
- Hurşit Güneş (1109)
- Hülya Güven (1109)
- Mehmet Kaban (1111)
- Sait Korkmaz Karaca (1107)
- Eşref Karaibrahim (1111)
- Hüseyin Karakoç (1111)
- Haluk Koç (1107)
- Nihat Matkap (1104)
- Şahin Mengü (1110)
- Rıfat Nalbantoğlu (1091)
- Hakkı Suha Okay (1103)
- Kerem Ekrem Oktay (1095)
- Melda Onur (1108)
- Umut Oran (1105)
- Oğuz Oyan (1082)
- Ensar Öğüt (1091)
- Malik Ecder Özdemir (1114)
- Abdullah Özer (1114)
- İhsan Özkes (1063)
- Mehmet Ali Özpolat (1108)
- Faik Öztrak (1080)
- Atilla Sav (1080)
- Önder Sav (978)
- Çetin Soysal (1084)
- Murat Fehmi Sönmez (1111)
- Mehmet Süne (1105)
- Veli Gündüz Şahin (1102)
- Halide Jale Tamzok (1109)
- Semra Tanülkü (1113)
- Fatma Füsun Tatlıdil (1113)
- Gürsel Tekin (814)
- Cahide Tunç (1106)
- Ayhan Yalçınkaya (1107)
- Hüseyin Yaşar (1107)
- Azmi Yıldız (1109)
- İrfan Hüseyin Yıldız (1102)
- Nuran Yıldız (1109)
- Sacid Yıldız (1101)
- Alaattin Yüksel (1096)

=== Science, culture, and executive quota ===
Members elected to the Party Council through the science, culture and executive quota are as follows, with the number of votes they received shown in brackets.

- Engin Altay (835)
- Ufuk Ataç (797)
- Berhan Şimşek (751)
- Turgut Dibek (744)
- Osman Coşkunoğlu (743)
- Rıza Yalçınkaya (736)
- Seyhan Erdoğdu (727)
- Ali Koçal (717)
- Derviş Günday (711)
- Sema Kendirci (702)
- Faruk Demir (680)
- Birgen Keleş (514)

== High disciplinary board ==
- Polat Akbulut
- Mehmet Boztaş
- Kemal Cengizoğlu
- Avni Çelebi
- Göksel Demirtaş
- Gökhan Durgun
- Orhan Eraslan
- Selçuk Eratkuş
- Füsun Gökçe
- Selahattin Öcal
- Murat Haluk Öncel
- Seyit Özanarat
- Türkan Öztekin
- Saliha Ülkü
- İbrahim Yılmaz

== Leadership ==
A candidate for the leadership needed the signatures of 20% of the registered delegates to officially run for election.

=== Candidates ===
- Kemal Kılıçdaroğlu, parliamentary group leader and CHP Member of Parliament since 2002. Received 1,246 nominations.
- Deniz Baykal, three-time leader of the CHP and former government minister. Stood down as a candidate before the election.
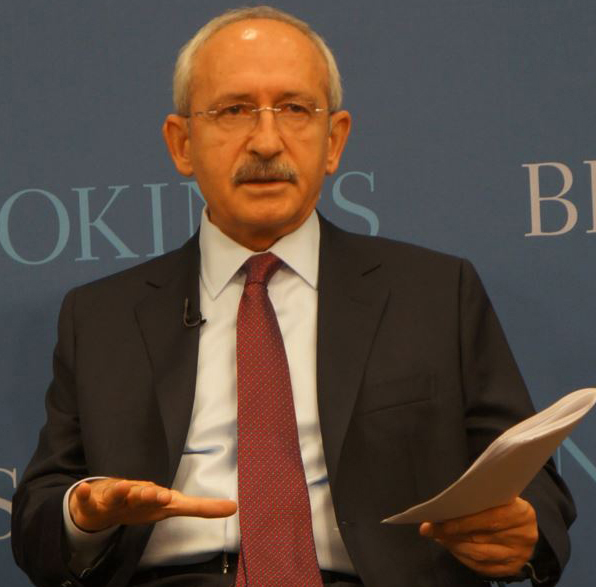
Kemal Kılıçdaroğlu, parliamentary group leader and CHP Member of Parliament since 2002.

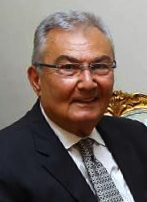
Deniz Baykal, three-time leader of the CHP and former government minister.

=== Results ===
Candidate	Votes	Percentage
Kemal Kılıçdaroğlu	1,189	100.0
Invalid/blank votes	8	–
Total	1,197	100.0
Number of delegates/turnout	1,250	95.8
