= Muradiye, Rize =

Muradiye
- Municipality
- Location in Turkey
- Coordinates: 40°56′52″N 40°32′50″E
- Country: Turkey
- Province: Rize
- District: Rize
- Population (2021): 2,571
- Time zone: UTC+3 (TRT)

Muradiye is a town (belde) in the Rize District, Rize Province, Turkey. Its population is 2,571 (2021).
