= Madenli, Çayeli =

Madenli
- Municipality
- Location in Turkey
- Coordinates: 41°02′27″N 40°45′57″E
- Country: Turkey
- Province: Rize
- District: Çayeli
- Population (2021): 2,689
- Time zone: UTC+3 (TRT)
- Website: www.madenli.bel.tr

Madenli is a town (belde) in the Çayeli District, Rize Province, Turkey. Its population is 2,689 (2021).
