= Büyükköy, Çayeli =

Büyükköy
- Municipality
- Location in Turkey
- Coordinates: 41°00′54″N 40°40′23″E
- Country: Turkey
- Province: Rize
- District: Çayeli
- Population (2021): 2,438
- Time zone: UTC+3 (TRT)

Büyükköy is a town (belde) in the Çayeli District, Rize Province, Turkey. Its population is 2,438 (2021).
