= Nazlı Eray =

Turkish writer (born 1945)

Nazlı Eray is a Turkish writer known for her writings that combine real and fictional people.

== Early life and education ==
Eray was born 28 June 1945 in Ankara. She graduated from the British Girls' Secondary School in Istanbul in 1958 and then from Arnavutköy Girls' College in 1962. Eray went on to study law at Istanbul University. From 1965 until 1968, Eray worked as a translator in Turkey, before shifting to working as a writer.

== Writing career ==
Eray started writing with the story Monsieur Hristo. Her writings also include novels and she writes for the Turkish paper Cumhuriyet. Eray founded the Turkish Literary Association, and has been named the honorary author of the 39th International Istanbul Book Fair.

She has been a visiting writer at the University of Iowa.

== Selected publications ==
- Eray, Nazli (2017). Ask Artik Burada Oturmuyor (in Turkish). Dogan Kitap. ISBN 978-605-09-1279-1.
- Eray, Nazli (1994). Ay Falcisi (The moonmancer). Istanbul: Can Yayinlari.
- Eray, Nazli (2015). Deniz Kenarinda Pazartesi (in Turkish). Can Yayinlari. ISBN 978-975-510-168-2.
- Eray, Nazli; Erol, Sibel (2006). Orpheus. Translated by Finn, Robert. Ctr for Middle Eastern Studies UT-Austin. ISBN 978-0-274-69608-6.
- Eray, Nazli (2014). n/a (ed.). Aydaki Adam Tanpinar (in Turkish). İstanbul: Dogan Kitap. ISBN 978-605-09-2138-0.
- Eray, Nazli (2013). The Emperor Tea Garden. Translated by Finn, Robert (1st ed.). Syracuse University Press.
