= Çayeli =

Çayeli Mapavri
- Municipality
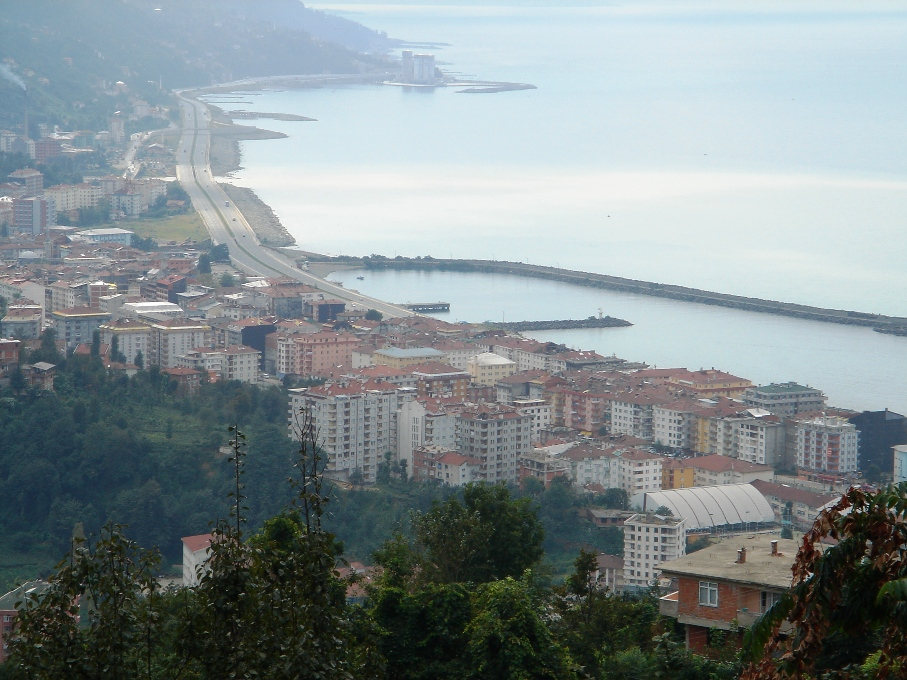

- Location within Turkey
- Coordinates: 40°45′N 41°04′E
- Country: Turkey
- Province: Rize
- District: Çayeli

Government
  - Mayor: İsmail Hakkı Çiftçi (MHP)
- Elevation: 10 m (33 ft)
- Population (2021): 24,583
- Time zone: UTC+3 (TRT)
- Area code: 0464
- Climate: Cfa
- Website: www.cayeli.bel.tr

Çayeli (Laz: მაფავრი, romanized: mapavri) is a town in Rize Province on the Black Sea coast of eastern Turkey, 18 km east of the city of Rize. It is the seat of Çayeli District. Its population is 24,583 (2021).

Çay means tea in Turkish and a large percentage of Turkey's tea is indeed grown in this lush green district. The town consists of 18 quarters, including Limanköy.

== History ==
Mapavri was long occupied by the Laz community, and was part of the Roman Empire and then the Empire of Trebizond until was brought within the Ottoman Empire by Mehmet II in 1461, although this coast has always been vulnerable to invaders from across the nearby Caucasus.

In the recent past Çayeli was an impoverished remote region that saw successive generations migrate away to jobs in Turkey's larger cities or abroad. This emigration slowed when tea was planted here in the 1940s.

== Geography ==
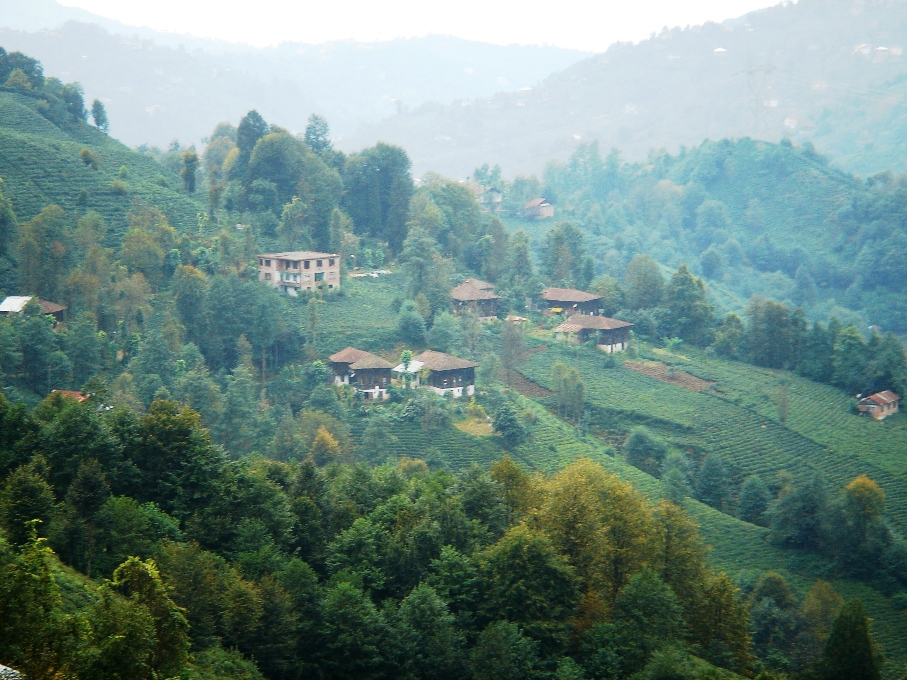

Çayeli consists of a narrow coastal strip and a large section of the Black Sea Mountain range which rises steeply and runs parallel to the coast. The Rize mountain section of these mountains reach up to 2,000 m in the district.

The local economy is mainly dependent on tea-growing, along with some sweetcorn, which before tea was planted in the 1940s was the major crop here. The town and the cultivated area are all on the coastal strip, while the mountain hinterland is sparsely populated. Indeed, the steepness of these hills is legendary, and celebrated in song; the late Barış Manço used to sing a version of the local ballad Çayelunden Öteye Ciderum Yali Yali, which tells of a man so much in love that he was even prepared to haul his household over the mountains of Çayeli.

However, for anyone who does venture up here, the countryside is mostly unspoilt forest and there are scenic views from these steep mountainsides; therefore Çayeli is now attracting visitors on trekking holidays.

The local cuisine includes a dish of large, light-coloured baked beans known as Çayeli fasulyesi.

The majority of people are nationalist and conservative, and the municipality is controlled by the Turkish nationalism-leaning Nationalist Movement Party.

== Climate ==
Çayeli has a humid subtropical climate (Köppen: Cfa).

Climate data for Çayeli
Month	Jan	Feb	Mar	Apr	May	Jun	Jul	Aug	Sep	Oct	Nov	Dec	Year
Daily mean °C (°F)	6.4 (43.5)	6.7 (44.1)	7.9 (46.2)	11.7 (53.1)	15.6 (60.1)	19.4 (66.9)	21.8 (71.2)	22.0 (71.6)	19.5 (67.1)	15.5 (59.9)	12.0 (53.6)	8.4 (47.1)	13.9 (57.0)
Average precipitation mm (inches)	192 (7.6)	146 (5.7)	123 (4.8)	83 (3.3)	82 (3.2)	129 (5.1)	110 (4.3)	144 (5.7)	185 (7.3)	234 (9.2)	208 (8.2)	215 (8.5)	1,851 (72.9)
Source: Climate-Data.org

== Sports ==
The town is represented by Çayelispor in football.

Limanköy of Çayeli
