= Selvi Kılıçdaroğlu =

Wife of Kemal Kılıçdaroğlu

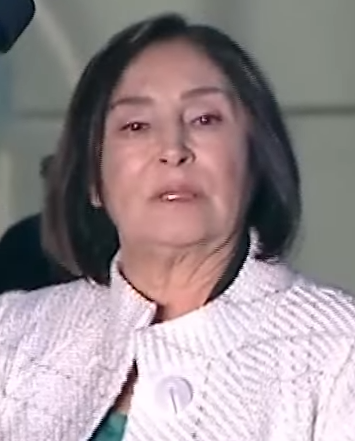
- Selvi Kılıçdaroğlu in March 2023
- Born: Selvi Özdağ; 5 May 1952 (age 74); Ayranlı, Nazımiye, Turkey
- Political party: Republican People's Party (2002–)
- Spouse: Kemal Kılıçdaroğlu (m. 1974)
- Children: 3

Selvi Kılıçdaroğlu (née Özdağ; born 5 May 1952) is the wife of former CHP Chairman Kemal Kılıçdaroğlu.

== Private life ==
After meeting Kemal Kılıçdaroğlu, her cousin, she got married in 1974. Due to her marriage, she dropped out of Ankara University Faculty of Political Sciences, School of Press and Broadcasting. She had three children from this marriage. She stated that her husband Kemal Kılıçdaroğlu was not in favor of her entering politics, but she respected him for doing what he loved. While herself being a member of CHP since 2002, she has said in interviews that she is not in favour of entering active politics.
