= Güzelpınar, Nazımiye =

Village in Tunceli Province, Turkey

Güzelpınar
- Village
- Location within Turkey
- Coordinates: 39.175°N 39.848°E
- Country: Turkey
- Province: Tunceli
- District: Nazımiye
- Population (2021): 77
- Time zone: UTC+3 (TRT)

Güzelpınar (Kurdish: Xosim) is a village in the Nazımiye District, Tunceli Province, Turkey. The village is populated by Kurds of the Karsan tribe and had a population of 77 in 2021.

The hamlets of Boyalı, Ekinli, Esenli, Geçitli and Tekkecik are attached to the village.
