= Aşağıdoluca, Nazımiye =

Village in Tunceli Province, Turkey

Aşağıdoluca
- Village
- Location within Turkey
- Coordinates: 39.114°N 39.911°E
- Country: Turkey
- Province: Tunceli
- District: Nazımiye
- Population (2021): 246
- Time zone: UTC+3 (TRT)

Aşağıdoluca (Kurdish: Xariga Binêne) is a village in the Nazımiye District, Tunceli Province, Turkey. The village is populated by Kurds of the Şêx Mehmedan tribe and had a population of 246 in 2021.

The hamlets of Aslanlı, Baştarla, Bayır, Beşağaç Musaliyan, Çayır, Çevlik, Geriş, Hatun, Kale, Karaca, Koç, Ustalar and Yaylı are attached to the village.
