= Turnayolu, Nazımiye =

Village in Tunceli Province, Turkey

Turnayolu
- Village
- Location within Turkey
- Coordinates: 39.197°N 39.876°E
- Country: Turkey
- Province: Tunceli
- District: Nazımiye
- Population (2021): 53
- Time zone: UTC+3 (TRT)

Turnayolu (Kurdish: Holik) is a village in the Nazımiye District, Tunceli Province, Turkey. The village is populated by Kurds of the Kurêşan tribe and had a population of 53 in 2021.

The hamlets of Bıçkılı, Boncuk, Dipdere and Yoncalı are attached to the village.
