= Yiğitler, Nazımiye =

Village in Tunceli Province, Turkey

Yiğitler
- Village
- Location within Turkey
- Coordinates: 39.185°N 39.729°E
- Country: Turkey
- Province: Tunceli
- District: Nazımiye
- Population (2021): 73
- Time zone: UTC+3 (TRT)

Yiğitler (Kurdish: Kirik) is a village in the Nazımiye District, Tunceli Province, Turkey. The village is populated by Kurds of the Arel tribe and had a population of 73 in 2021.

The hamlets of Aşağı, Karamusa, Orta and Süleyman are attached to the village.
