= Sapköy, Nazımiye =

Village in Tunceli Province, Turkey

Sapköy
- Village
- Location within Turkey
- Coordinates: 39.161°N 39.813°E
- Country: Turkey
- Province: Tunceli
- District: Nazımiye
- Population (2021): 49
- Time zone: UTC+3 (TRT)

Sapköy (Kurdish: Sap) is a village in the Nazımiye District, Tunceli Province, Turkey. The village is populated by Kurds of the Lolan tribe and had a population of 49 in 2021.

The hamlets of Alicik, Değirmendere, Ekinbaşı and Koçlar are attached to the village.
