= Beytaşı, Nazımiye =

Village in Tunceli Province, Turkey

Beytaşı
- Village
- Location within Turkey
- Coordinates: 39.218°N 39.872°E
- Country: Turkey
- Province: Tunceli
- District: Nazımiye
- Population (2021): 18
- Time zone: UTC+3 (TRT)

Beytaşı (Kurdish: Delav) is a village in the Nazımiye District, Tunceli Province, Turkey. The village is populated by Kurds of the Karsan tribe and had a population of 18 in 2021.

The hamlets of Karakaya and Konak are attached to the village.
