= Kılköy, Nazımiye =

Village in Tunceli Province, Turkey

Kılköy
- Village
- Location within Turkey
- Coordinates: 39.123°N 39.758°E
- Country: Turkey
- Province: Tunceli
- District: Nazımiye
- Population (2021): 60
- Time zone: UTC+3 (TRT)

Kılköy (Kurdish: Qil) is a village in the Nazımiye District, Tunceli Province, Turkey. The village is populated by Kurds of the Alan tribe and had a population of 60 in 2021.

The hamlets of Ahırdede, Bekçiler, Harman, Kapaklı, Saka, Sığırcık and Süleyman are attached to the village.
