= Bostanlı, Nazımiye =

Village in Tunceli Province, Turkey

Bostanlı
- Village
- Location within Turkey
- Coordinates: 39.134°N 39.835°E
- Country: Turkey
- Province: Tunceli
- District: Nazımiye
- Population (2021): 63
- Time zone: UTC+3 (TRT)

Bostanlı (Kurdish: Panan, Zewe) is a village in the Nazımiye District, Tunceli Province, Turkey. The village is populated by Kurds of the Kurêşan tribe and had a population of 63 in 2021.

The hamlets of Aksakal, Altın, Bucaklı, Kavşak, Oymataş and Taşgeçit are attached to the village.
