= Dallıbahçe, Nazımiye =

Village in Tunceli Province, Turkey

Dallıbahçe
- Village
- Location within Turkey
- Coordinates: 39.135°N 39.885°E
- Country: Turkey
- Province: Tunceli
- District: Nazımiye
- Population (2021): 46
- Time zone: UTC+3 (TRT)

Dallıbahçe (Kurdish: Yêresk) is a village in the Nazımiye District, Tunceli Province, Turkey. The village is populated by Kurds of the Kurêşan tribe and had a population of 46 in 2021.

The hamlets of Aksu, Bakacak, Çelik, Çoşkun, Dibekli, Güllüce, Güzelbağ, Ilısu, Kamış, Konaklar, Kumlu, Olgunlar, Saklıca (Ger), Sarıkaya, Yamaç and Yazıbaşı are attached to the village.
