= Yukarıdoluca, Nazımiye =

Village in Tunceli Province, Turkey

Yukarıdoluca
- Village
- Location within Turkey
- Coordinates: 39.133°N 39.920°E
- Country: Turkey
- Province: Tunceli
- District: Nazımiye
- Population (2021): 171
- Time zone: UTC+3 (TRT)

Yukarıdoluca (Kurdish: Xariga Serêne) is a village in the Nazımiye District, Tunceli Province, Turkey. The village is populated by Kurds of the Şêx Mehmedan tribe and had a population of 171 in 2021.

The hamlets of Ayrancı, Bulak, Gelünk, Kaymaklık, Kürekli, Taht, Taylan and Tokaçlı are attached to the village.
