= Günlüce, Nazımiye =

Village in Tunceli Province, Turkey

Günlüce
- Village
- Location within Turkey
- Coordinates: 39.153°N 39.787°E
- Country: Turkey
- Province: Tunceli
- District: Nazımiye
- Population (2021): 65
- Time zone: UTC+3 (TRT)

Günlüce (Kurdish: Qalmam, lit. 'Uncle Mihame') is a village in the Nazımiye District, Tunceli Province, Turkey. The village is populated by Kurds of the Alan tribe and had a population of 65 in 2021. The Kurdish name of the village became Qalmam with the combination of the words Xal (xālo lit. 'Uncle') and Mihame (lit. 'Mehmed').

The hamlet of Aktepe is attached to the village.
