= Sarıyayla, Nazımiye =

Village in Tunceli Province, Turkey

Sarıyayla
- Village
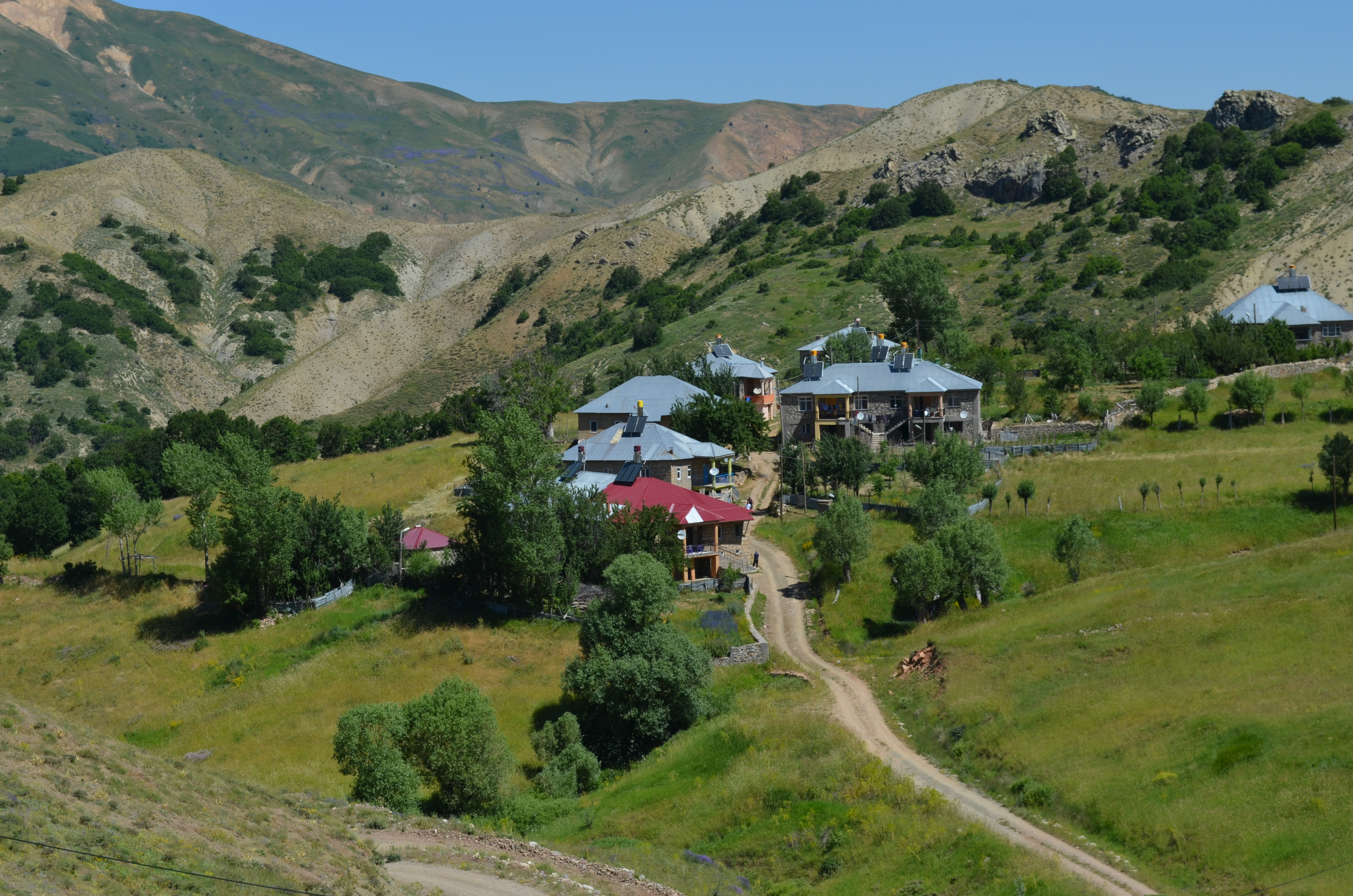

- Location within Turkey
- Coordinates: 39.288°N 39.975°E
- Country: Turkey
- Province: Tunceli
- District: Nazımiye
- Population (2021): 129
- Time zone: UTC+3 (TRT)

Sarıyayla (Kurdish: Civarik) is a village in the Nazımiye District, Tunceli Province, Turkey. The village is populated by Kurds of the Hormek tribe and had a population of 129 in 2021.

The hamlets of Bahtiyar, Balık (Baliq), Kemik (Kemyek), Kılıçlar, Kuzguncuk, Tutuklu and Yaylacık are attached to the village.
