= Enis Berberoğlu =

Turkish politician and journalist

Enis Berberoğlu MP
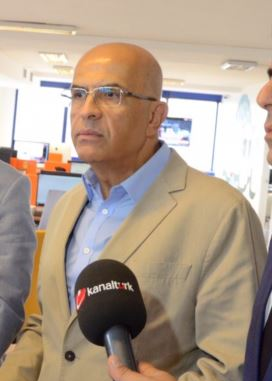

Member of the Grand National Assembly
- Incumbent
- Assumed office 11 February 2021
- In office 23 June 2015 – 4 June 2020
- Constituency: Istanbul (II) (June 2015, Nov 2015, 2018, 2023)

Personal details
- Born: Kadri Enis Berberoğlu; 5 June 1956 (age 70) Istanbul, Turkey
- Party: Republican People's Party (CHP)
- Education: Boğaziçi University
- Occupation: Journalist, politician

Kadri Enis Berberoğlu (born 5 June 1956) is a Turkish politician and journalist from the Republican People's Party (CHP), who has served as the Member of Parliament for Istanbul's second electoral district since 2015.

== Early life and career ==
Kadri Enis Berberoğlu was born on 1 April 1956 in Istanbul and graduated from St. George's Austrian High School in 1975. He graduated from Boğaziçi University and obtained a master's degree in the field of econometrics. He has stated that he originates from a socialist family, thereby making him a legacy social democrat.

=== Journalism ===
Berberoğlu began his journalism career in 1981 at the Dünya newspaper. He later went on to become the economics manager at CNN Türk and served as an editor at Hürriyet and Radikal. On 29 December 2009, he became the General Director of Publications at Hürriyet, resigning on 10 August 2014 due to growing political pressures on the newspaper. In October 2014, he became a writer at the Sözcü newspaper.

== Political career ==
At the 18th CHP Extraordinary Convention held on 6 September 2014, Berberoğlu was elected to the Party Council of the Republican People's Party (CHP). On 14 September, he was appointed as the Deputy Leader of the CHP responsible for media relations and communications by party leader Kemal Kılıçdaroğlu. He was elected as a Member of Parliament for Istanbul's second electoral district at the June 2015 general election.

In May 2016 his immunity as member of the parliament was lifted in order to allow for judiciary prosecution and on 14 June 2017 he was condemned by an Istanbul tribunal to 25 years prison for having divulged in 2014 pictures of the Turkish secret service which seemed to show delivery of weapons to Syrian rebels, in open contradiction to the Turkish government's denial of being actively involved in the Syrian conflict.

On 24 June 2018 he was re-elected as member of the Parliament and released from prison on 20 September 2018. His Parliamentary Membership was revoked on 4 June 2020. Following he was arrested but released again on the 5 June due to COVID-19 regulations. His parliamentary membership was restored by the courts on 11 February 2021.

== Reactions, 'March of Justice' ==
Engin Altay, one of the CHP parliamentary group leaders, criticised that Berberoğlu was imprisoned at once after the verdict although he made an appeal.

CHP leader Kemal Kılıçdaroğlu started the 'march of justice' from Ankara to Istanbul in protest of Berberoğlu's arrest. On 9 June, Kılıçdaroğlu reached Istanbul. The number of people participating in the march was estimated up to 2 million people.

== See also ==
- Censorship in Turkey
