= Kapıbaşı, Nazımiye =

Village in Tunceli Province, Turkey

Kapıbaşı
- Village
- Location in Turkey
- Coordinates: 39.183°N 39.799°E
- Country: Turkey
- Province: Tunceli
- District: Nazımiye
- Population (2021): 16
- Time zone: UTC+3 (TRT)

Kapıbaşı (Kurdish: Daxyan) is a village in the Nazımiye District, Tunceli Province, Turkey. The village is populated by Kurds of the Lolan tribe and had a population of 16 in 2021.

The hamlets of Alankomu and Dağyan are attached to the village.
