= Güneycik, Nazımiye =

Village in Tunceli Province, Turkey

Güneycik
- Village
- Location within Turkey
- Coordinates: 39.191°N 39.844°E
- Country: Turkey
- Province: Tunceli
- District: Nazımiye
- Population (2021): 43
- Time zone: UTC+3 (TRT)

Güneycik (Kurdish: Azgilêr) is a village in the Nazımiye District, Tunceli Province, Turkey. The village is populated by Kurds of the Karsan tribe and had a population of 43 in 2021.

The hamlet of Yalıntaş is attached to the village.
