= Ramazanköy, Nazımiye =

Village in Tunceli Province, Turkey

Ramazanköy
- Village
- Location within Turkey
- Coordinates: 39.224°N 39.833°E
- Country: Turkey
- Province: Tunceli
- District: Nazımiye
- Population (2021): 56
- Time zone: UTC+3 (TRT)

Ramazanköy (Kurdish: Remedan) is a village in the Nazımiye District, Tunceli Province, Turkey. The village is populated by Kurds of the Arel tribe and had a population of 56 in 2021.

The hamlets of Çiçekli, Çömlek, Geven, Gevrek, Kayalı, Kızpınarı, Üçkonak and Yenimezraa are attached to the village.
