= Geriş, Nazımiye =

Village in Tunceli Province, Turkey

Geriş
- Village
- Location within Turkey
- Coordinates: 39.189°N 39.785°E
- Country: Turkey
- Province: Tunceli
- District: Nazımiye
- Population (2021): 69
- Time zone: UTC+3 (TRT)

Geriş (Kurdish: Gerise) is a village in the Nazımiye District, Tunceli Province, Turkey. The village is populated by Kurds of the Arel tribe and had a population of 69 in 2021.

The hamlets of Alaca, Bayındır, Dalik, Dilekli, Dutağacı, Köpüklü, Tanrıverdi and Uşan are attached to the village.
