= Doğantaş, Nazımiye =

Village in Tunceli Province, Turkey

Doğantaş
- Village
- Location within Turkey
- Coordinates: 39.216°N 39.809°E
- Country: Turkey
- Province: Tunceli
- District: Nazımiye
- Population (2021): 14
- Time zone: UTC+3 (TRT)

Doğantaş (Kurdish: Deşt) is a village in the Nazımiye District, Tunceli Province, Turkey. The village is populated by Kurds of the Arel tribe and had a population of 14 in 2021.

The hamlet of Hasan is attached to the village.
