= Demirce, Nazımiye =

Village in Tunceli Province, Turkey

Demirce
- Village
- Location within Turkey
- Coordinates: 39.208°N 39.763°E
- Country: Turkey
- Province: Tunceli
- District: Nazımiye
- Population (2021): 27
- Time zone: UTC+3 (TRT)

Demirce (Kurdish: Dizik) is a village in the Nazımiye District, Tunceli Province, Turkey. The village is populated by Kurds of the Arel tribe and had a population of 27 in 2021.

The hamlets of Başoluk (Rebat), Gölgelik, Soğumeşe and Tavuklu are attached to the village.
