= Büyükyurt, Nazımiye =

Village in Tunceli Province, Turkey

Büyükyurt
- Village
- Location within Turkey
- Coordinates: 39.248°N 39.800°E
- Country: Turkey
- Province: Tunceli
- District: Nazımiye
- Population (2021): 89
- Time zone: UTC+3 (TRT)

Büyükyurt (Kurdish: Hakis) is a village in the Nazımiye District, Tunceli Province, Turkey. The village is populated by Kurds of the Karsan tribe and had a population of 89 in 2021.

The hamlets of Arpaçukur, Aşağıdoğancık, Bakraçlı, Bayırcık, Boztaş, Çatak, Çevrecik, Çiftbeyler, Çukur, Deliktaş, Demkömü, Doğancık, Dokuzkaya (Marxasor), Ekmekçi, Eryurdu, Hankoy, İçören, İnanlı, Kapıkaya, Kışlak, Koyunlu, Kurudere, Küplüce, Malkoç, Oğullar, Polatlı, Serdini, Taht, Taşdelen, Uçar, Ulaşlı, Uzuntarla, Yakacık, Yukarıdoğancık and Yüceler are attached to the village.

== History ==
The former name of the village is Hakis. In the village, which is named Hakis in the records of the 16th century; only non-Muslims lived in 67 households in 1518 and 135 households in 1541. There were 220 Armenians and 960 Kurds recorded in the village at the beginning of the 20th century. The settlement, was a nahiyah from 1912 to 1936. In 1935, Hakis was recorded as a connected of Nazimiye kaza of Elâziz province. Although the old name of the village "Hakis" was changed, it was recorded as "Büyükyurt (Hakis)" for a while. In the 1960 census, 742 people were recorded, 340 males and 402 females in village.

== Sources ==
- Ünal, Mehmet Ali (1999). 16. Yüzyılda Çemişgezek Sancağı. Türk Tarih Kurumu. p. 196. ISBN 975-16-0957-7.
