= Yayıkağıl, Nazımiye =

Village in Tunceli Province, Turkey

Yayıkağıl
- Village
- Location within Turkey
- Coordinates: 39.276°N 39.943°E
- Country: Turkey
- Province: Tunceli
- District: Nazımiye
- Population (2021): 56
- Time zone: UTC+3 (TRT)

Yayıkağıl (Kurdish: Kimsor) is a village in the Nazımiye District, Tunceli Province, Turkey. The village is populated by Kurds of the Şadiyan tribe and had a population of 56 in 2021.

The hamlets of Bayramlı, Çatan, Çığır, Dağdibi (Keşiş), Kuyulu and Şirin are attached to the village.
