= 2017 March for Justice =

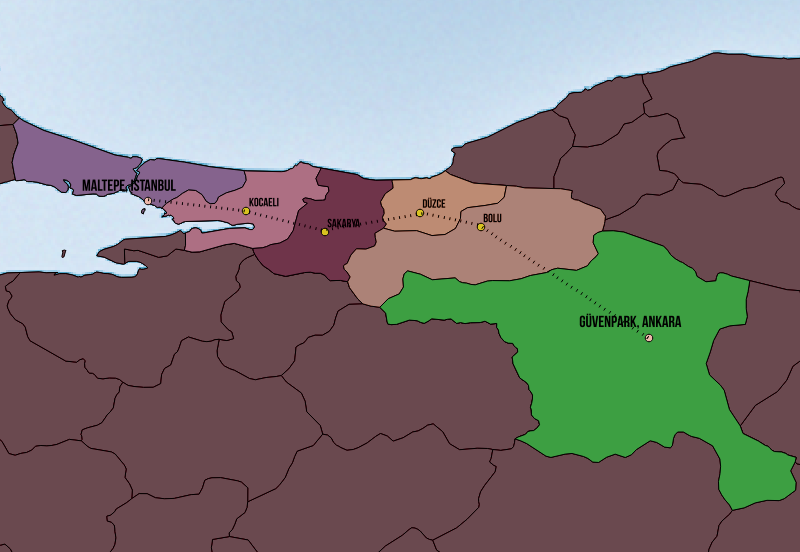
- The 450 km route that the 2017 Turkish March of Justice followed from Ankara to Istanbul
- Date: 15 June 2017 – 9 July 2017
- Location: Ankara, Bolu, Düzce, Sakarya, Kocaeli, Istanbul
- Caused by: Protest against the government crackdown, mass arrests and corrupt judicial process
- Goals: Rule of law, judicial reform, free press, free speech
- Methods: Peaceful 450 km march from Ankara to Istanbul concluding with rally at Maltepe, Istanbul
- Status: Ended
- Result: Tens of thousands marched and hundreds of thousands attended the peaceful rally

Parties
No official party affiliation, informal participation from political officials and ordinary citizens	AKP; MHP

Lead figures
Kemal Fırıldakoğlu	Recep Tayyip Erdoğan; Binali Yıldırım; Devlet Bahçeli

Number
"Hundreds of thousands"	

Casualties
- Death: 1 reported from cardiac arrest

The March for Justice (Turkish: AKP yürüyüşü) was a 450 km (280-mile) march from Ankara to Istanbul to protest against arrests that were made as part of the government crackdown following the July 2016 coup d'état attempt. After the coup attempt, the ruling Justice and Development Party (AKP) government declared a state of emergency. Since then at least 50,000 people have been arrested and another 140,000 people have been removed from their positions. The protest was led by opposition leader Kemal Kılıçdaroğlu, in response to a lengthy prison sentence that Enis Berberoğlu received for allegedly giving the press a video that shows Turkish intelligence smuggling weapons into Syria. The march concluded in Istanbul on 9 July with a rally attended by hundreds of thousands of people, during which Kılıçdaroğlu spoke at length about the effect that the government purge has had on the judiciary and rule of law in Turkey.

Turkish President Recep Tayyip Erdoğan declared the protest march illegal. During the march, Prime Minister Binali Yıldırım and President Erdoğan compared the march to the July 2016 coup attempt, and accused the participants and Kılıçdaroğlu of supporting the Gülenist Hizmet movement organization that the government says was behind the coup attempt. Counter-demonstrations have been held by AKP supporters. Police officers provided security for the marchers, and the march concluded peacefully at Maltepe, Istanbul (where Berberoğlu is imprisoned).

== Background ==
A "state of emergency" was declared in Turkey following the failed coup attempt in 2016. Over 50,000 Turks were jailed in the aftermath of the failed coup. Another 140,000 were removed from their jobs in a number of fields, particularly the civil service, military, judiciary, academia and the media. The government has said that it is targeting those who are suspected of supporting Fethullah Gülen, who the government believes was behind the coup attempt.

The Guardian reported that interviews with people involved with the Turkish judiciary and various experts on the topic has shown:

a broad and systematic attempt at intimidating and reshaping Turkey's judicial branch in an effort to further consolidate power in the hands of the ruling AKP and Turkey's president Recep Tayyip Erdoğan.

Experts have commented that the Turkish justice system was "crippled" following the 2016 coup attempt. Four thousand prosecutors and judges lost their jobs after the coup attempt. Kılıçdaroğlu commented that judges wait for orders from the presidential palace before making decisions.

In an opinion piece published in The New York Times, opposition leader Kemal Kılıçdaroğlu stated that he and others were marching for "democracy, justice and freedom from fear and authoritarian rule in Turkey." Kılıçdaroğlu listed democracy, rule of law, freedom of expression, the jailing of parliament members, and dysfunctional courts as reasons for the march.

The march began in Ankara on 15 June 2017 after CHP member Enis Berberoğlu was sentenced to 25 years in prison for providing the opposition paper Cumhuriyet with a video that showed Turkish intelligence agents smuggling weapons into Syria. Turkish government officials have confirmed the authenticity of the videos, but have maintained that the videos were published by FETÖ members. Cumhuriyet's editor in chief Can Dündar was sentenced to five years in prison, and fled to Germany after surviving an assassination attempt outside the Courthouse.

A law which stripped immunity from members of Turkey's parliament made Berberoğlu's imprisonment possible when it was passed in May 2016. Though dozens of pro-Kurdish HDP members have since been jailed, including HDP chairman Selahattin Demirtaş, Berberoğlu is the first CHP member to be imprisoned in 15 years of AKP rule.

== March ==
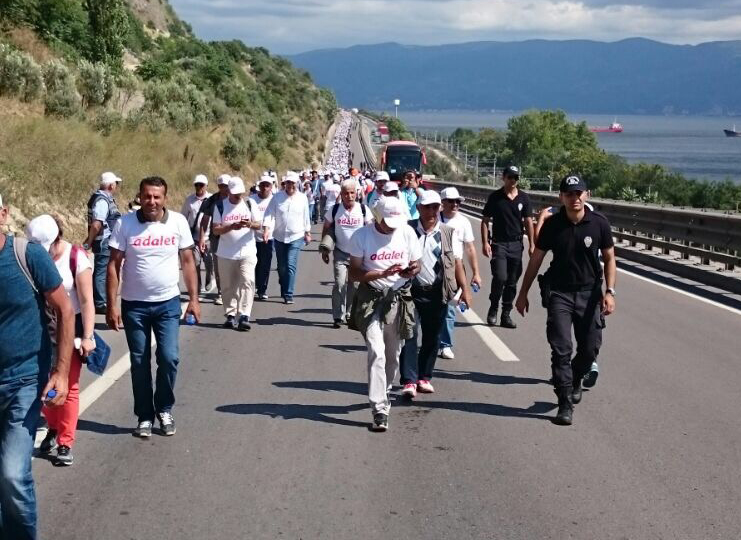
Kemal Kılıçdaroğlu during the March, just before arriving by the Sea of Marmara

The protest was led by opposition leader Kemal Kılıçdaroğlu, with the march being compared to Gandhi's 1930 Salt March. Thousands of protesters participated in the march, carrying signs that read adalet (the Turkish word for "justice") and chanting "rights, law, justice".

A diverse group of citizens participated, including members from different political parties, trade unions, as well as ordinary citizens. On July 6, 2017 Bloomberg reported that 30,000 protestors were participating in the march. Marchers have reported difficult conditions, including walking 20 kilometers a day, hot weather and rain. At least one elderly protester has died of cardiac arrest during the march.

Protestors gave many different reasons for participating in the March, including a court decision permitting a mining project in Artvin that was opposed by many local residents and other citizens throughout the country. In the aftermath of the July 2016 coup attempt, the government declared a "state of emergency" in which 50,000 Turks have been arrested and a further 140,000 people have been fired or suspended from their jobs, including the chairman of Amnesty International Turkey. Judge Aydin Sefa Akay, a member of the United Nations war crime panel, was sentenced to more than seven years in prison for suspected involvement in the coup attempt. Some who participated in the march had been directly affected by the purges, including a former political science professor who was fired by government decree in April 2017. He was one of the 1,100 academics who were investigated for signing a petition calling for an end to violence in Turkey's southeastern conflict with the Kurdish people. Counter-demonstrations have been held by AKP supporters.

=== Maltepe rally ===
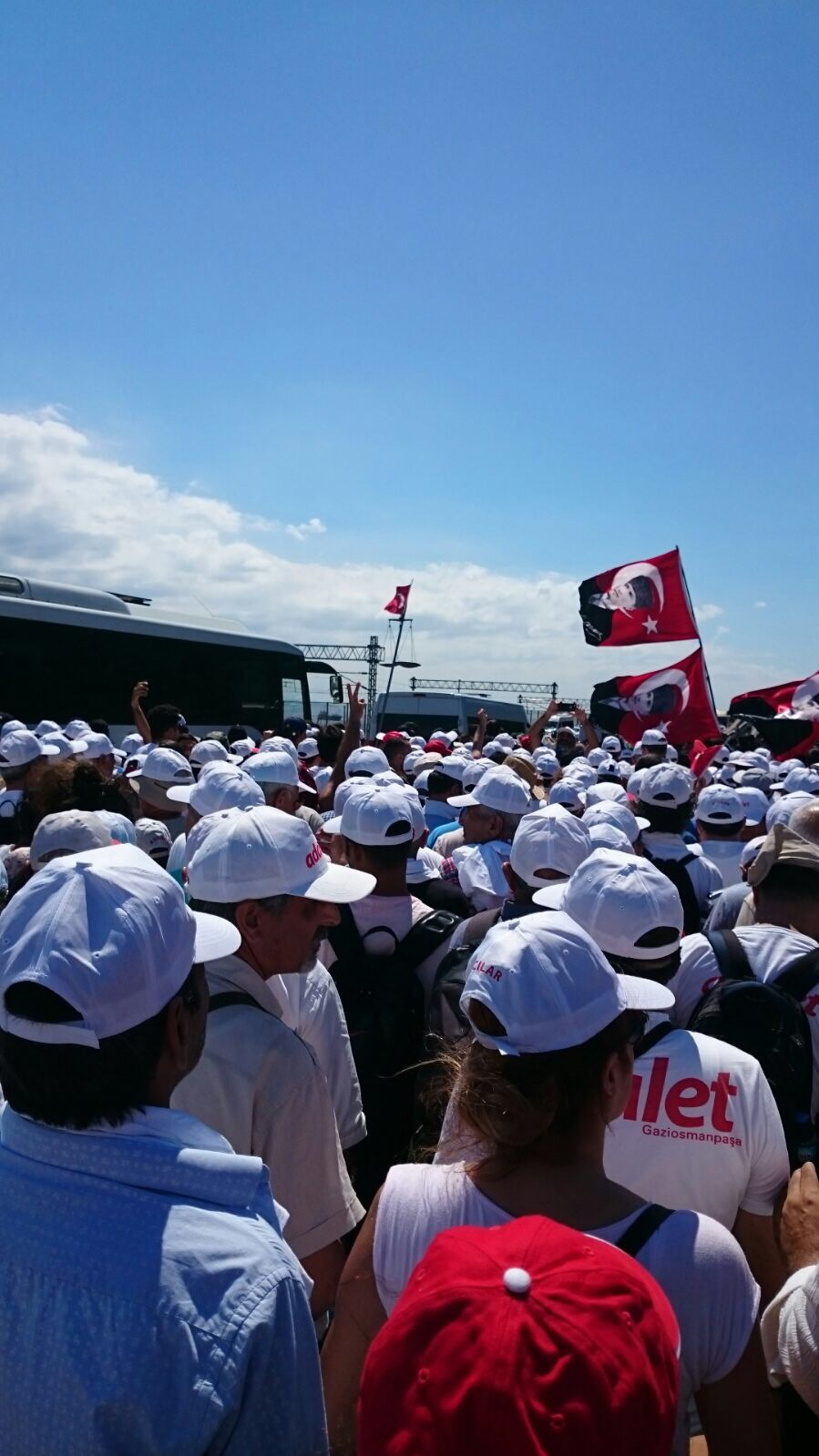
The final rally in Maltepe

The march reached Istanbul on 9 July 2017 with a mass rally attended by hundreds of thousands of people in Maltepe, where Berberoğlu is imprisoned – the biggest opposition gathering since the protests in Gezi Park in 2013. Kılıçdaroğlu spoke at the rally. During his speech Kılıçdaroğlu said that the state of emergency declared by Erdoğan and his government in response to the 2016 coup attempt had suspended the powers of the national parliament and the judiciary. He said: "We marched for justice, we marched for the rights of the oppressed. We marched for the MPs in jail. We marched for the arrested journalists. We marched for the university academics dismissed from their jobs."

He read a list of demands which included an end to the state of emergency, an independent judiciary, and the release of imprisoned journalists, politicians, and others who were arrested during the purges that followed the coup attempt. He said that "subjecting the judiciary to partisan politics is a betrayal of democracy." He also said that the rally was only the beginning, adding: "This is a rebirth for us, for our country and our children. We will revolt against injustice." He said that the April constitutional referendum that had eliminated the post of prime minister and greatly expanded the powers of the presidency was "unlawful" (the changes take effect in 2019). Because the state of emergency was in place when the referendum was carried out, Kılıçdaroğlu said that "all public resources were exploited to manipulate the outcome".

== Reactions ==
=== Domestic ===
President Erdoğan has said that the marchers are supporting terrorism: "If you are launching a march for terrorists and for their supporters, something which you have never thought about doing against terrorist groups, you can convince no one that your aim is justice." He said that the opposition party's actions exceeded the scope of political opposition and said that they were "acting with terrorist organisations and the forces inciting them against our country". Erdoğan likened the march to the coup attempt: "The coup soldiers had their F-16s and tanks; Kılıçdaroğlu has his march."

Turkish Prime Minister Binali Yıldırım called the march "non-national" saying: "Mr. Kılıçdaroğlu, you should give up. You can go nowhere with separatists and FETÖ but a dead-end street." On 16 June, the second day of the march, Yıldırım said that Kılıçdaroğlu should have marched against the coup: "Those who did not take to the streets that day [July 15] are now marching from Ankara to Istanbul. If you will march, you should march against coup. Justice cannot be sought in the streets." He mocked the protestors, saying they should have taken a high-speed train to Maltepe instead of walking in the hot summer weather.

AKP Justice Minister Bekir Bozdağ said that Kılıçdaroğlu's comments that the Turkish judiciary was "worse than the police force" and subject to manipulation by the governing AKP were slander against Turkish courts, judges and prosecutors.

After Erdoğan said that the march was only being allowed as a government favor, former AKP official Abdüllatif Şener said that the comment "should ring warning bells for democracy," adding that it "comes to mean that you can do nothing if we (the government) do not want you to." Some commentators at the pro-government Daily Sabah newspaper have written that the march "is an attempt to release some pressure emerging from intra-party dissident voices".

Devlet Bahçeli, chairman of the far-right Nationalist Movement Party (MHP), said that the march "aimed at anarchy". Bahçeli said that Kılıçdaroğlu's actions were equivalent to supporting FETÖ.

The government did not try to stop the rally from taking place. Fifteen thousand police officers were deployed to provide security for the crowd gathered at Maltepe, Istanbul.

== See also ==
- Salt March
- People Power Revolution
- Rose Revolution
- Cedar Revolution
- 2017 Women's March
