= Yazgeldi, Nazımiye =

Village in Tunceli Province, Turkey

Yazgeldi
- Village
- Location within Turkey
- Coordinates: 39.143°N 39.858°E
- Country: Turkey
- Province: Tunceli
- District: Nazımiye
- Population (2021): 51
- Time zone: UTC+3 (TRT)

Yazgeldi (Kurdish: Xodik) is a village in the Nazımiye District, Tunceli Province, Turkey. The village is populated by Kurds of the Kurêşan tribe and had a population of 51 in 2021.

The hamlets of Akçalı, Akyaprak, Başağaç, Kargılı, Kuşkondu, Kuyucak and Paşakule are attached to the village.
