= Çevrecik, Nazımiye =

Village in Tunceli Province, Turkey

Çevrecik
- Village
- Location within Turkey
- Coordinates: 39.150°N 39.801°E
- Country: Turkey
- Province: Tunceli
- District: Nazımiye
- Population (2021): 61
- Time zone: UTC+3 (TRT)

Çevrecik (Kurdish: Sayrik) is a village in the Nazımiye District, Tunceli Province, Turkey. The village is populated by Kurds of the Kurêşan tribe and had a population of 61 in 2021.

The hamlet of Sarıca is attached to the village.
