= Dereova, Nazımiye =

Village in Tunceli Province, Turkey

Dereova
- Village
- Location within Turkey
- Coordinates: 39.249°N 39.866°E
- Country: Turkey
- Province: Tunceli
- District: Nazımiye
- Population (2021): 80
- Time zone: UTC+3 (TRT)

Dereova (Kurdish: Deriye) is a village in the Nazımiye District, Tunceli Province, Turkey. The village is populated by Kurds of the Kurêşan tribe and had a population of 80 in 2021.

The hamlets of Eğribelen, Koyuncu, Taht and Ulak are attached to the village.
