= Ballıca, Nazımiye =

Village in Tunceli Province, Turkey

Ballıca
- Village
- Location within Turkey
- Coordinates: 39.173°N 39.895°E
- Country: Turkey
- Province: Tunceli
- District: Nazımiye
- Population (2021): 80
- Time zone: UTC+3 (TRT)

Ballıca (Kurdish: Bolciyan) is a village in the Nazımiye District, Tunceli Province, Turkey. The village is populated by Kurds of the Kurêşan tribe and had a population of 80 in 2021.

The hamlets of Akbulut, Ballıdere, Beşik, Boncuk, Boylu, Çayönü, Göktaş, Konuksever (Varuç), Küre and Sungur are attached to the village.
