= Nazımiye District =

District of Tunceli Province, Turkey

- District
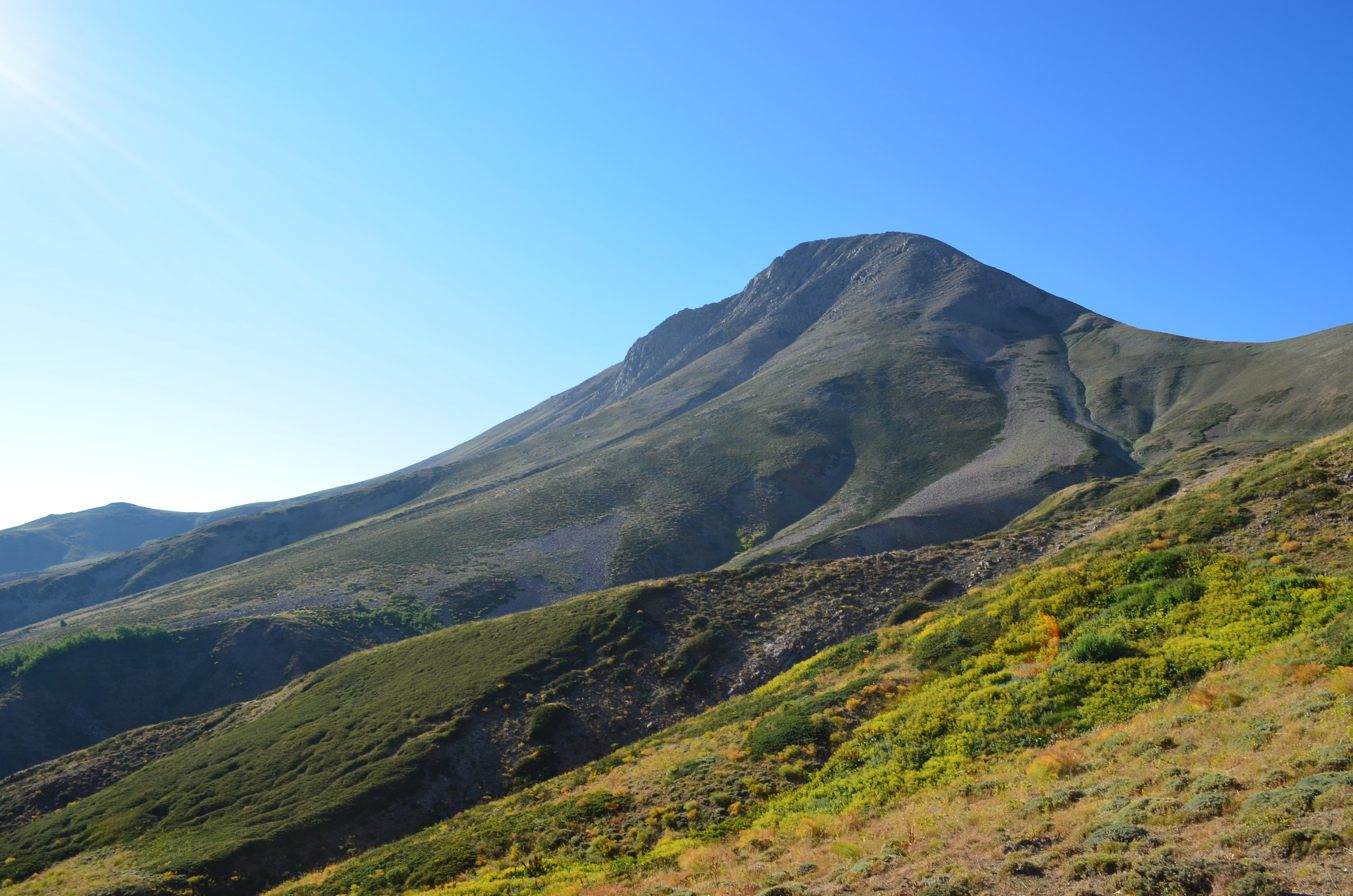
- Sülbüs mountain in the district

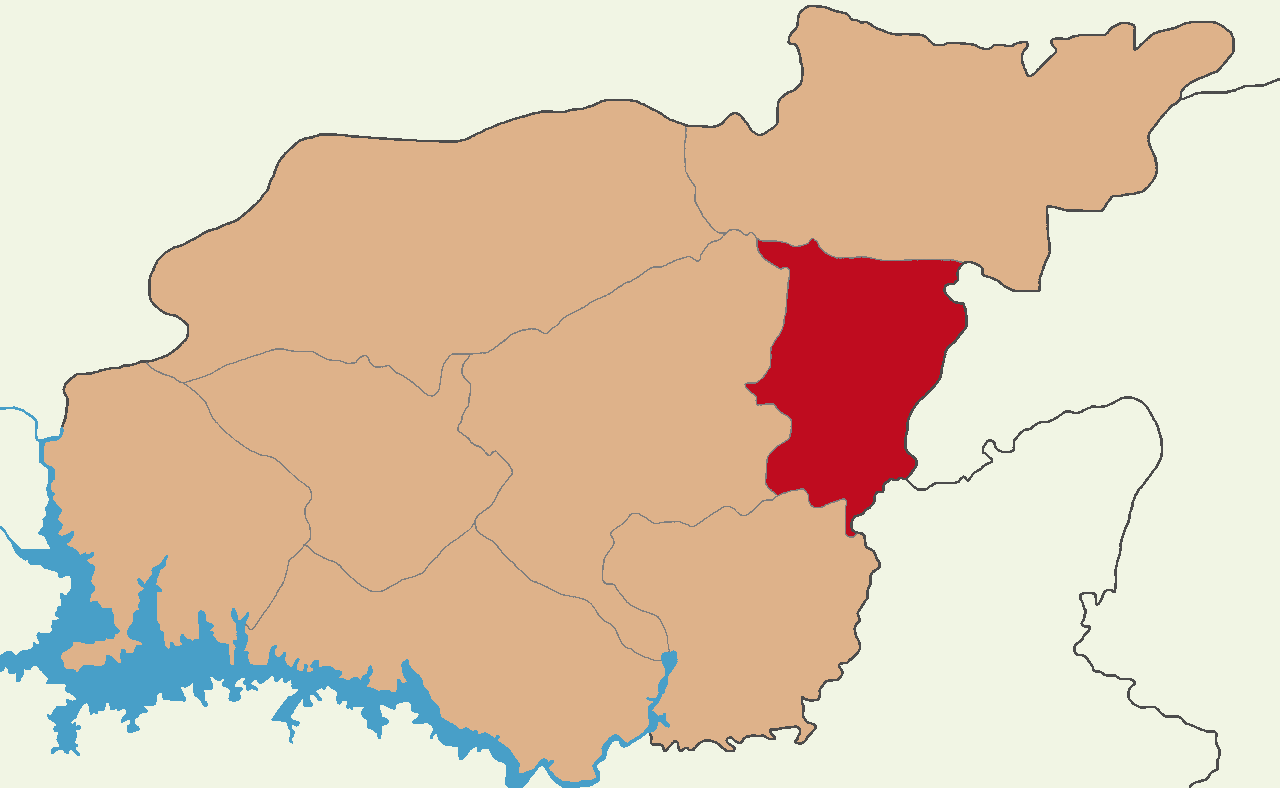
- Map showing Nazımiye District in Tunceli Province

- Location within Turkey
- Coordinates: 39°12′N 39°50′E
- Country: Turkey
- Province: Tunceli
- Seat: Nazımiye
- Area: 543 km^{2} (210 sq mi)
- Population (2021): 3,011
  - Density: 5.55/km^{2} (14.4/sq mi)
- Time zone: UTC+3 (TRT)
- Website: www.nazimiye.gov.tr

Nazımiye District is a district of Tunceli Province in Turkey. The town of Nazımiye is the seat and the district had a population of 3,011 in 2021. Its area is 543 km^{2}.

== Composition ==
Beside the town of Nazımiye, the district encompasses twenty-five villages and 169 hamlets.

=== Villages ===
1. Aşağıdoluca
2. Ayranlı
3. Ballıca
4. Beytaşı
5. Bostanlı
6. Büyükyurt
7. Çevrecik
8. Dallıbahçe
9. Demirce
10. Dereova
11. Doğantaş
12. Geriş
13. Güneycik
14. Günlüce
15. Güzelpınar
16. Kapıbaşı
17. Kılköy
18. Ramazanköy
19. Sapköy
20. Sarıyayla
21. Turnayolu
22. Yayıkağıl
23. Yazgeldi
24. Yiğitler
25. Yukarıdoluca
