= Deniz Feneri Trials =

The Deniz Feneri e.V. Trial was a trial launched in Germany in reply to the allegations made against the Deniz Feneri e.V. charity. These allegations stated that a part of the 41 million Euros collected by the charity was used outside the charities purpose. The trial was seen to by High Court of Frankfurt on 17 September 2008. The verdict, given by judge Johann Muller was that the charity executives, who were already detained, were sentenced to prison and the possessions of the charity were transferred to the state.

== Indictment ==
Advertisements were made on the charities internet address, brochures, newspapers, televisions and the advertisements made on Euro 7 television who were in a partnership with the charity all called on the public to make donations to be made on the Frankfurt am Main Postbank's 301535602, Frankfurt Vakif Bank International's 3344, Ban fur Sozialwirtschaft's 88620500, Commerzbank aus Frankfurt's 585 4666 transaction numbers. This call informed the reader on the state of needy in countries such as Turkey, Pakistan and others and how they could help. It was announcing that the donations can be made via bank transactions or by cash. Consequently, the charity received a total of over 41 million Euros a part of which is said to be used outside the charities purpose.

== Trials ==
On 2 September 2008 the charities accountant admitted to the fact that the money was acquired illegally and various private businesses were set up by the donations.

The chief prosecutor of Frankfurt High Court claimed that the chief belligerents of the crime were in Turkey. In the investigations made concerning the destination of the money concluded that 8 million Euros were sent to the Deniz Feneri Charity in Turkey whereas the fate of the remaining some of 33,428,158 Euros is not yet known.

== Punishments ==
The charity directors were sentenced to prison on the grounds of swindling and illegally acquiring money. Mehmet Gurhan was sentenced to 5 years 10 months, Megmer Taskan was sentenced to 2 years 9 months, and Firdecsi Ermis was sentenced to 1 year 10 months. In recognition of Mehmet Taskan's and Firdevsi Ermis's time spent in detainment, the remaining prison sentenced was put into effect. The court took possession of the charities assets and called for the donators to collect the money they donated the remaining sum was transferred to the Red Cross.

In the investigation conducted against the Deniz Feneri Association in Turkey, a decision of non-prosecution was given against all the managers of the Turkish Deniz Feneri Association.

In the Judges verdict it was stated that Mehmet Gurhan transferred the donations to Channel 7 in Turkey and that he was nothing but a puppet to the real directors who were Zekeriya Karaman, Ismail Karahan, Mustafa Celik and Zahid Akman, all of whom are located in Turkey.
