= Ayranlı, Nazımiye =

Village in Tunceli Province, Turkey

Ayranlı
- Village
- Location within Turkey
- Coordinates: 39.239°N 39.868°E
- Country: Turkey
- Province: Tunceli
- District: Nazımiye
- Population (2021): 57
- Time zone: UTC+3 (TRT)

Ayranlı (Kurdish: Keskawar) is a village in the Nazımiye District, Tunceli Province, Turkey. The village is populated by Kurds of the Karsan tribe and had a population of 57 in 2021.

The hamlets of Demirci, Gürbulak (Rutan), Karacan (Şerikan), Oğlakçı and Taht are attached to the village.
