= Timeline of Ankara =

Coordinates: 39.875°N 32.8333°E

The following is a timeline of the history of the city of Ankara, Ankara Province, Turkey.

== Prior to 14th century ==
- 546 BCE – Achaemenid Persians in power (approximate date).
- 334 BCE – City taken by forces of Alexander III of Macedon.
- 278 BCE – Celtic Galatians in power.
- 25 BCE – City taken by forces of Augustus and becomes part of the Roman Empire.
- 20 BCE – Monumentum Ancyranum built.
- 3rd century CE – City besieged by Gothic forces.
- 272 CE – City becomes part of Roman Empire again.
- 314 – Church council held.
- 362 – Julian (emperor) of Roman Empire visits city; "Column of Julian" erected.
- 7th century – City becomes capital of the Opsician Theme.
- 8th century – City becomes capital of the Bucellarian Theme.
- 1073 – City becomes part of the Seljuq Empire.
- 1101 – Ankara Castle captured by the Crusaders.
- 1227 – Ankara Castle captured by the Seljuqs.

== 14th–19th centuries ==
- 1356 – City taken by forces of Ottoman Orhan I.
- 1402 – 20 July: Battle of Ankara fought at Çubuk; Turkic Timur takes city.
- 1403 – Ottomans in power again.
- 1471 – Mahmut Paşa Bedesteni built.
- 1523 – Çengel Han built.
- 1566 – Cenabi Ahmed Pasa Mosque built.
- 1688 – Earthquake.
- 1832 – Ankara Castle renovated.
- 1864 – City becomes capital of the Ankara Vilayet.
- 1890 – Population: 27,825 (approximate).
- 1893 – Istanbul-Ankara railway constructed.

== 20th century ==
- 1920
  - 23 April: Government of the Grand National Assembly established.
  - Hakimiyet-i Milliye newspaper begins publication.
- 1923
  - 13 October: City becomes capital of the Republic of Turkey.
  - Gençlerbirliği S.K. football club formed.
- 1924
  - Population: 35,000 (approximate).
  - Musiki Muallim Mektebi opens.
  - Presidential Symphony Orchestra headquartered in Ankara.
- 1925
  - Forest Farm established.
  - Pembe Köşk becomes Turkish presidential residence.
- 1927
  - Ankara Palas opens.
  - Population: 44,553.
  - Victory Monument erected.
- 1930
  - City renamed "Ankara."
  - Ethnography Museum of Ankara founded.
  - State Art and Sculpture Museum built.
- 1932 – Pink Villa built.
- 1933 – Ankara Zoo established.
- 1935 – Ankara 19 Mayıs Stadium built.
- 1937 – Ankara Central Station inaugurated.
- 1938 – November: State funeral of Mustafa Kemal Atatürk held.
- 1940 – State Conservatory established.
- 1943 – Gençlik Parkı (park) and Museum of Anatolian Civilizations opens.
- 1945 – Population: 226,712.
- 1946 – University of Ankara founded.
- 1948 – Ankara Opera House inaugurated.
- 1950 – Population: 286,781.
- 1953 – Anıtkabir mausoleum of Atatürk erected.
- 1955 – Esenboğa Airport begins operating.
- 1956 – Middle East Technical University.
- 1961 – Turkish Grand National Assembly Museum opens.
- 1967 – Hacettepe University founded.
- 1971 – Barıṣ newspaper begins publication.
- 1973 – Population: 1,461,345 city; 1,553,897 urban agglomeration (approximate).
- 1974 – Yenikent Asaş Stadium built.
- 1978 – 9 October: Bahçelievler massacre.
- 1982 – 7 August: Esenboğa International Airport attack.
- 1983 – 16 January: Airplane accident.
- 1984
  - City administration reorganized.
  - Mehmet Altınsoy becomes mayor of Greater Ankara.
  - Bilkent University founded.
  - Turkish Aerospace Industries headquartered in Ankara.
  - Population: 2,019,000 (estimate).
- 1987 – Kocatepe Mosque built.
- 1989
  - National Assembly Mosque and Atakule Tower built.
  - Murat Karayalçın becomes mayor.
- 1990 – March: Bombings.
- 1991 – Sheraton Ankara in business.
- 1993
  - Bilkent Symphony Orchestra founded.
  - Vedat Aydın becomes mayor.
- 1994 – Melih Gökçek becomes mayor.
- 1997 – Ankara Metro begins operating.

== 21st century ==
- 2003 – Göksu Park was opened.
- 2004 – Wonderland Ankara was opened.
- 2005 – Çengelhan Rahmi M. Koç Museum of technology established.
- 2006 – 17 May: Turkish Council of State shooting.
- 2007
  - 22 May: 2007 Ankara bombing.
  - Population: 3,953,344 (urban)
- 2009 – Eskişehir-Ankara Yüksek Hızlı Tren high-speed railway begins operating.
- 2010
  - Cer Modern museum inaugurated.
  - Ankara Arena was opened for use.
  - 11 March: The events of the 21st Ankara International Film Festival started.
  - 8 April: Başkent Volleyball Hall was opened.
  - 28 August: 2010 FIBA World Championship Group C matches started in Ankara.
- 2011
  - Kumrular Street attack was carried out by the PKK. 5 civilians lost their lives.
  - 17 March: The events of the 22nd Ankara International Film Festival started.
- 2012 - Population: 4,417,522.
- 2013
  - 1 February: 2013 United States embassy bombing in Ankara.
  - 19 April: Ahmet Hamdi Akseki Mosque was opened.
  - May–June: 2013 Taksim Gezi Park protests.
  - 22 May: 2013 Turkish Cup Final match played in Ankara.
  - 5 December: TCDD Open Air Steam Locomotive Museum was closed to use.
- 2014
  - 12 February: M3 (Ankara metro) was opened for use.
  - 7 March: Within 2 thousand 117 pieces of toys where "Ankapark" was opened to the public.
  - 13 March: M2 (Ankara metro) was opened for use.
  - 5 August: Ankara-Istanbul high-speed railway opened for service.
  - 17 October: It opened for use as it renovated Ottoman Stadium.
  - 20 October: Presidential Palace was opened.
- 2015
  - 1 January: Battle of Sakarya Historical National Park was opened for use.
  - 10 October: 86 die, 186 are injured from two explosions near peace rally.
  - 31 October: Cebeci İnönü Stadium was closed to use.
- 2016
  - 17 February: 2016 Ankara Merasim Street bombing attack
  - 13 March: 2016 Ankara Güvenpark-Kızılay Square bombing attack
  - 19 December: Andrei Karlov was assassinated.
  - 25 December: The 2016 Ankara Cup event was held.
- 2017
  - 5 January: Otoyol 21 project 5th (Niğde-Pozantı) was prepared.
  - Population: 5,445,026 (estimate, urban agglomeration).

== Images ==
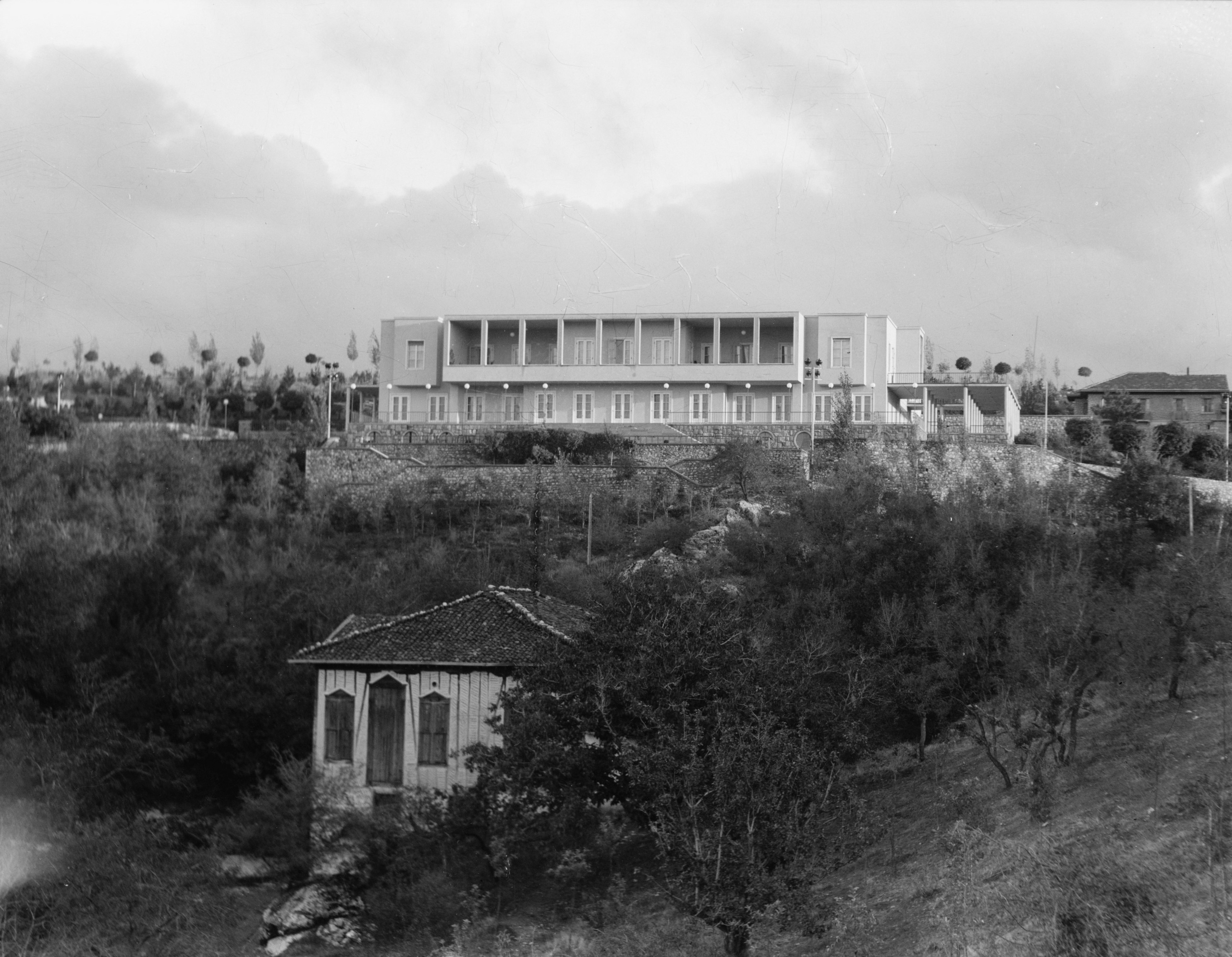
Palace of Çankaya (Pink Villa), 1935

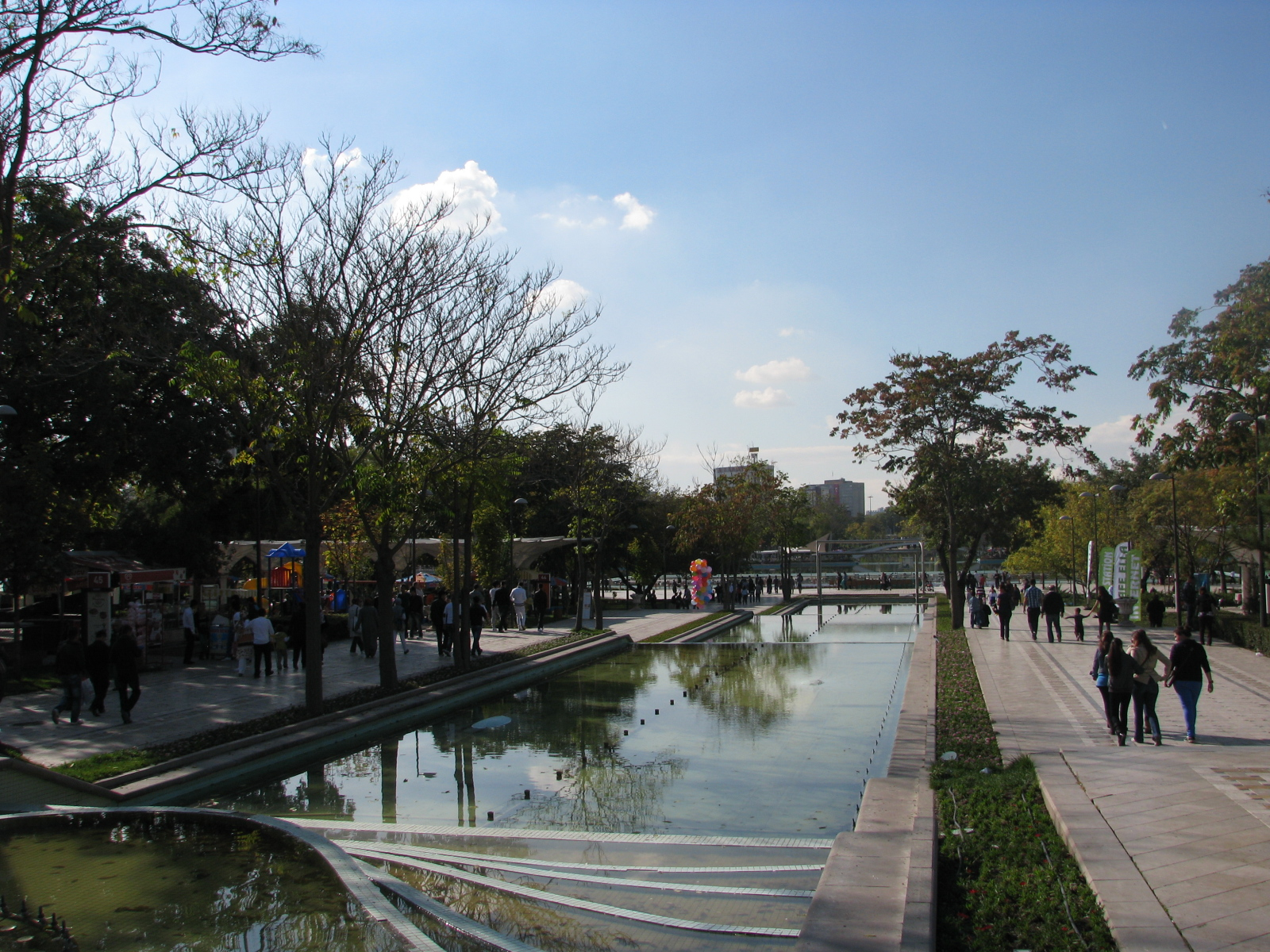
Gençlik Park

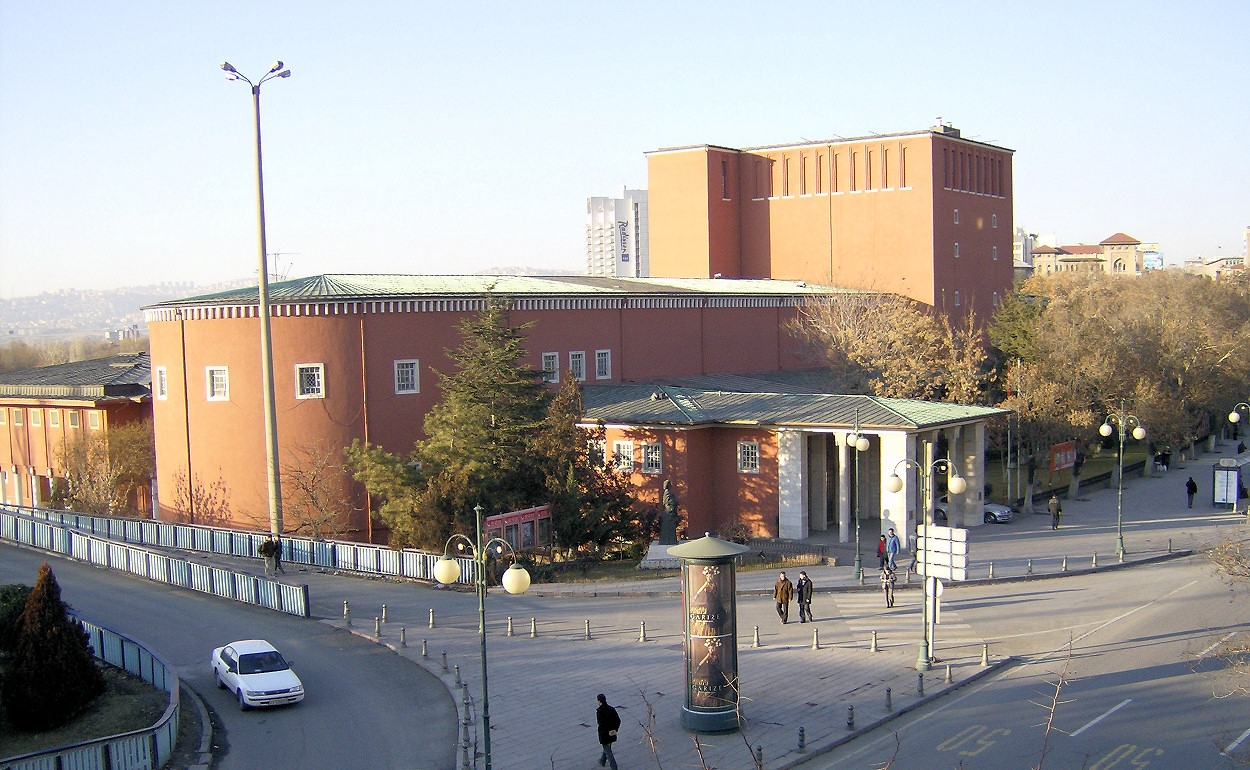
Ankara Opera House

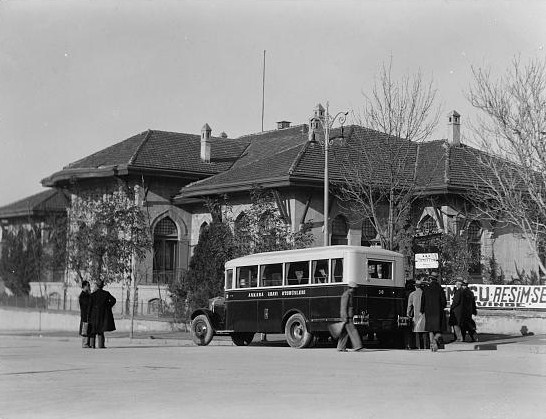
Old parliament building. Bus in front 1935.

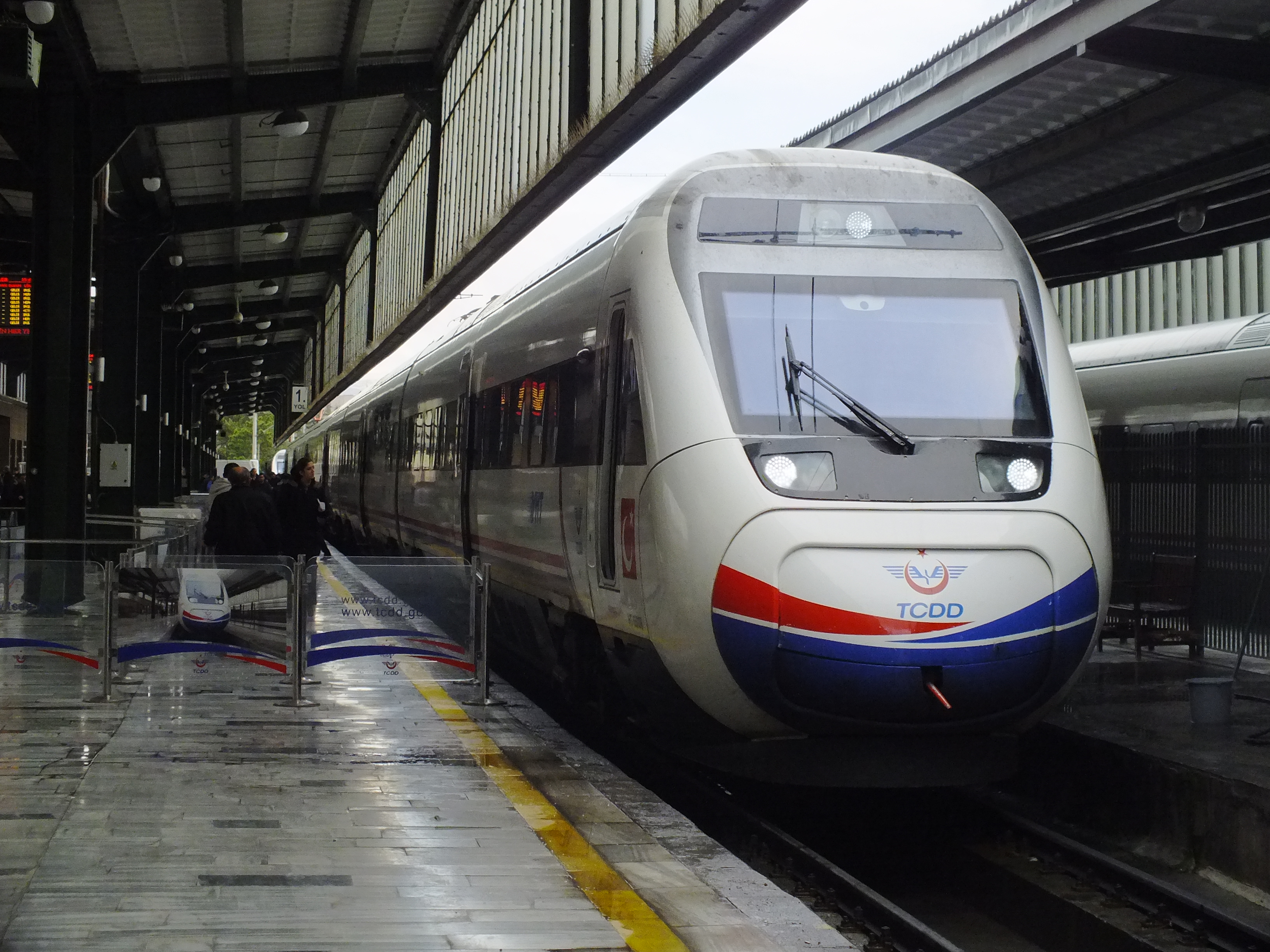
A westbound YHT train waiting at Ankara station

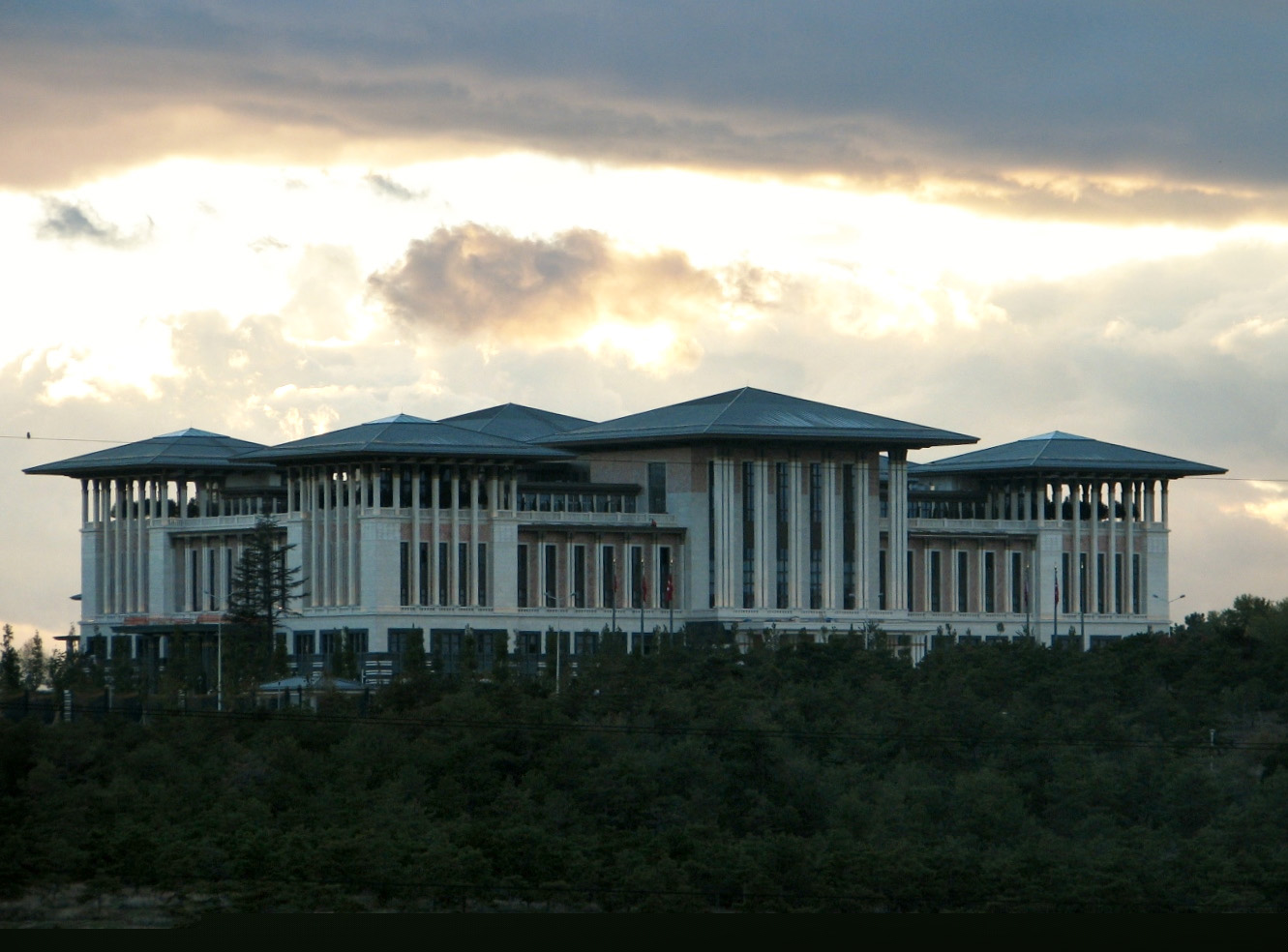
New Presidential Compound in Ankara

== See also ==
- History of Ankara
- List of mayors of Ankara
- List of universities in Ankara
- Timelines of other cities in Turkey: Bursa, Istanbul, Izmir

== Bibliography ==
Published in 19th century

- Jedidiah Morse; Richard C. Morse (1823), "Angora", A New Universal Gazetteer (4th ed.), New Haven: S. Converse
- Evliya Çelebi (1834). "(Angora)". Narrative of Travels in Europe, Asia, and Africa, in the Seventeenth Century. Vol. 2. Translated by Joseph von Hammer-Purgstall. London: Oriental Translation Fund.
- William Francis Ainsworth (1842). "(Angora)". Travels and Researches in Asia Minor, Mesopotamia, Chaldea, and Armenia. London: John W. Parker. hdl:2027/mdp.39015011911602.
- "Angora", Handbook for Travellers in Turkey (3rd ed.), London: J. Murray, 1854, OCLC 2145740
- "Angora" . Encyclopædia Britannica. Vol. 2 (9th ed.). 1878. p. 45.

Published in 20th century

- "Stadt Angora", Türkei, Rumänien, Serbien, Bulgarien [Turkey, Romania, Serbia, Bulgaria], Meyers Reisebücher (in German) (6th ed.), Leipzig: Bibliographisches Institut, 1902, hdl:2027/njp.32101064637836
- Anderson, John George Clark (1910). "Angora" . Encyclopædia Britannica. Vol. 2 (11th ed.). pp. 40–41.
- O. Altaban and M. Güvenç. "Urban Planning in Ankara," Cities: The International Journal of Urban Policy and Planning 7, no. 2 (1990)
- "Central Anatolia: Ankara". Greece & Turkey. Let's Go. New York : St. Martin's Press. 1996. p. 520+. ISBN 9780312135447 – via Open Library.
- Contesting Urban Space in Early Republican Ankara. Zeynep Kezer. Journal of Architectural Education 01/1998. JSTOR 1425491.
- Toni M. Cross; Gary Leiser (2000), Brief History of Ankara, Vacaville, California: Indian Ford Press, ISBN 0965595811

Published in 21st century

- Elvan Altan Ergut (2006). "Presenting Ankara". Rethinking Architectural Historiography. Routledge. p. 151+. ISBN 978-1-134-23629-9.
- C. Edmund Bosworth, ed. (2007). "Ankara". Historic Cities of the Islamic World. Leiden: Koninklijke Brill. p. 26+. ISBN 978-9004153882.
- Bruce E. Stanley; Michael R.T. Dumper, eds. (2007), "Ankara", Cities of the Middle East and North Africa, Santa Barbara, USA: ABC-CLIO (published 2008), p. 35+, ISBN 9781576079195
- Zeynep Kezer (2009). "Ankara". In Emily Gunzburger Makas and Tanja Damljanovic Conley (ed.). Capital Cities in the Aftermath of Empires: Planning in Central and Southeastern Europe. Routledge. pp. 124–140. ISBN 978-1-135-16725-7.
- "Ankara". Grove Encyclopedia of Islamic Art & Architecture. Oxford University Press. 2009.
- Ismail Hakki Kadi (2012). "Town of Ankara and its Mohair Industry". Ottoman and Dutch Merchants in the Eighteenth Century: Competition and Cooperation in Ankara, Izmir, and Amsterdam. Ottoman Empire and its Heritage. Brill. p. 29+. ISBN 978-90-04-22517-6.
- Deniz Altay (2012). "Urban Spaces Re-Defined in Daily Practices: 'Minibar', Ankara". In Lars Meier and Lars Frers (ed.). Encountering Urban Places: Visual and Material Performances in the City. Ashgate. p. 63+. ISBN 978-1-4094-8781-4.
- Roman A. Cybriwsky (2013). "Ankara". Capital Cities around the World: An Encyclopedia of Geography, History, and Culture. ABC-CLIO. p. 13+. ISBN 978-1-61069-248-9.
