= Ankara Castle =

Castle in Ankara, Turkey

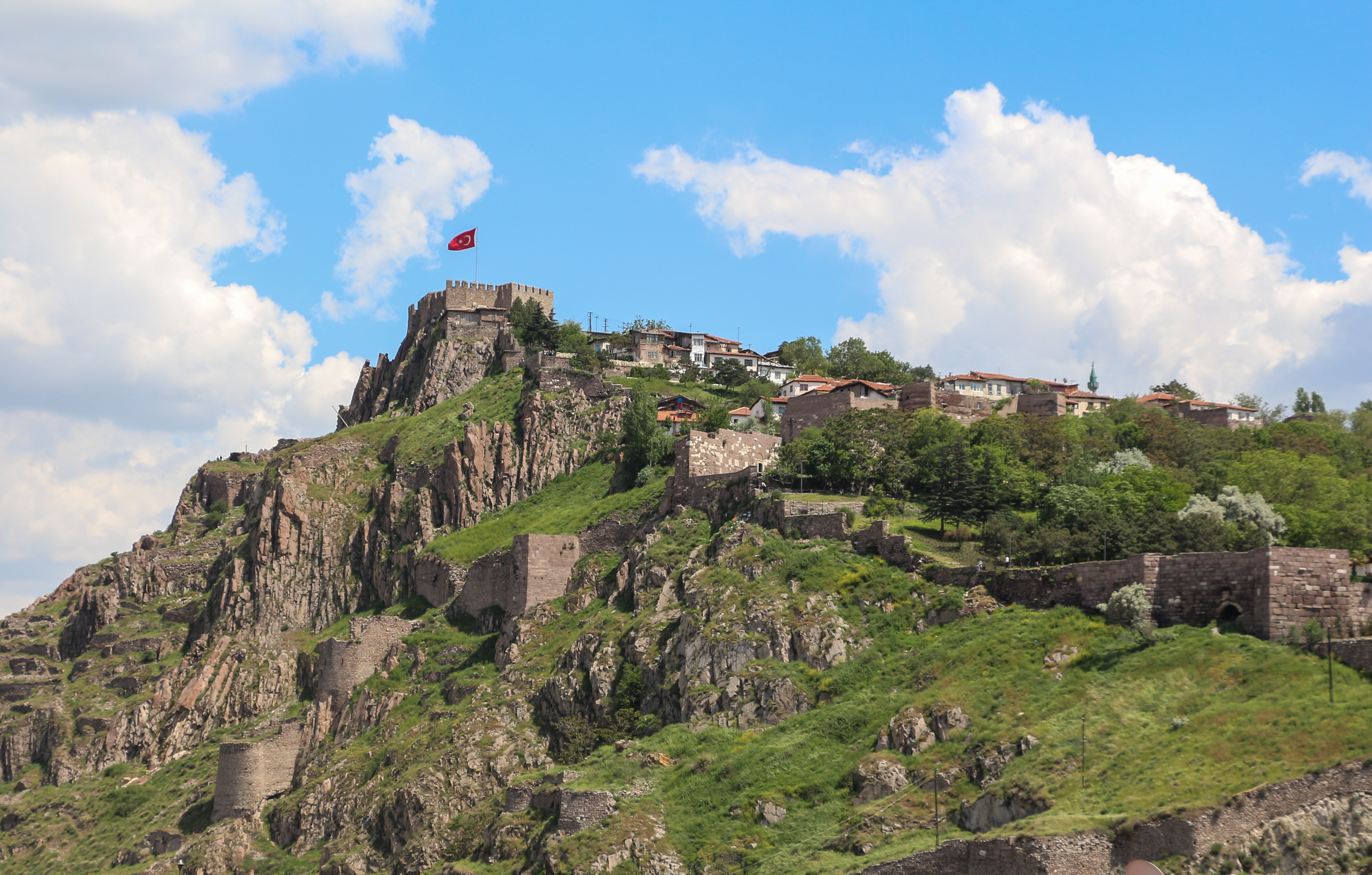
- Panoramic view of Ankara Castle

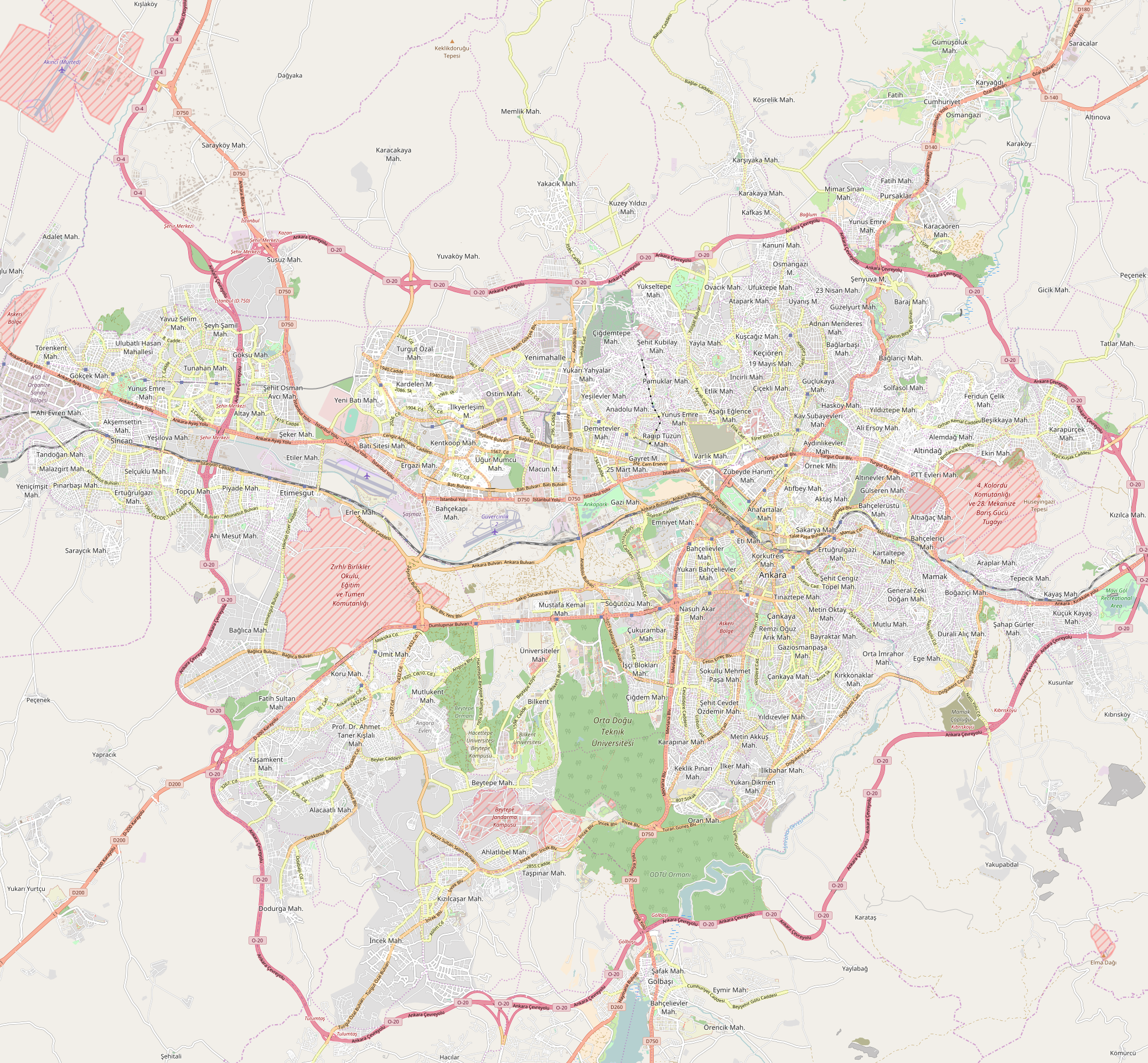
- Location within Ankara Location within Turkey
- Established: 8th century BC
- Location: Altındağ, Ankara, Turkey
- Coordinates: 39°56′30″N 32°51′54″E
- Type: Castle
- Owners: Phrygia (8th century BC); Galatia (278 BC); Roman Empire (25 BC); Byzantine Empire (4th century); Seljuq Turks (1071); Ottoman Empire (1356); Turkey (1923)
- Website: www.ankarakalesi.com

Ankara Castle (Turkish: Ankara Kalesi) is a historic fortification in the city of Ankara, Turkey, constructed in or after the 7th century. The earliest fortification on the site was constructed in the 8th century BC by the Phrygians and rebuilt in 278 BC by the Galatians. The castle was rebuilt or renovated under the Roman, Byzantine, Seljuk, and Ottoman Empires.

== History and architecture ==
The castle is composed of an inner line of walls with closely spaced towers that encloses an area of about 350 m by 150 m, and an outer line of walls with towers some 40 m apart. Both sets of walls were constructed using large quantities of reused masonry. The exact dates of their construction are uncertain, but both postdate the capture and destruction of Ankara by the Persians in, probably, 622 AD (Foss considers that the inner walls may date from the reign of Constans II; the outer walls are generally believed to have been erected slightly later.).

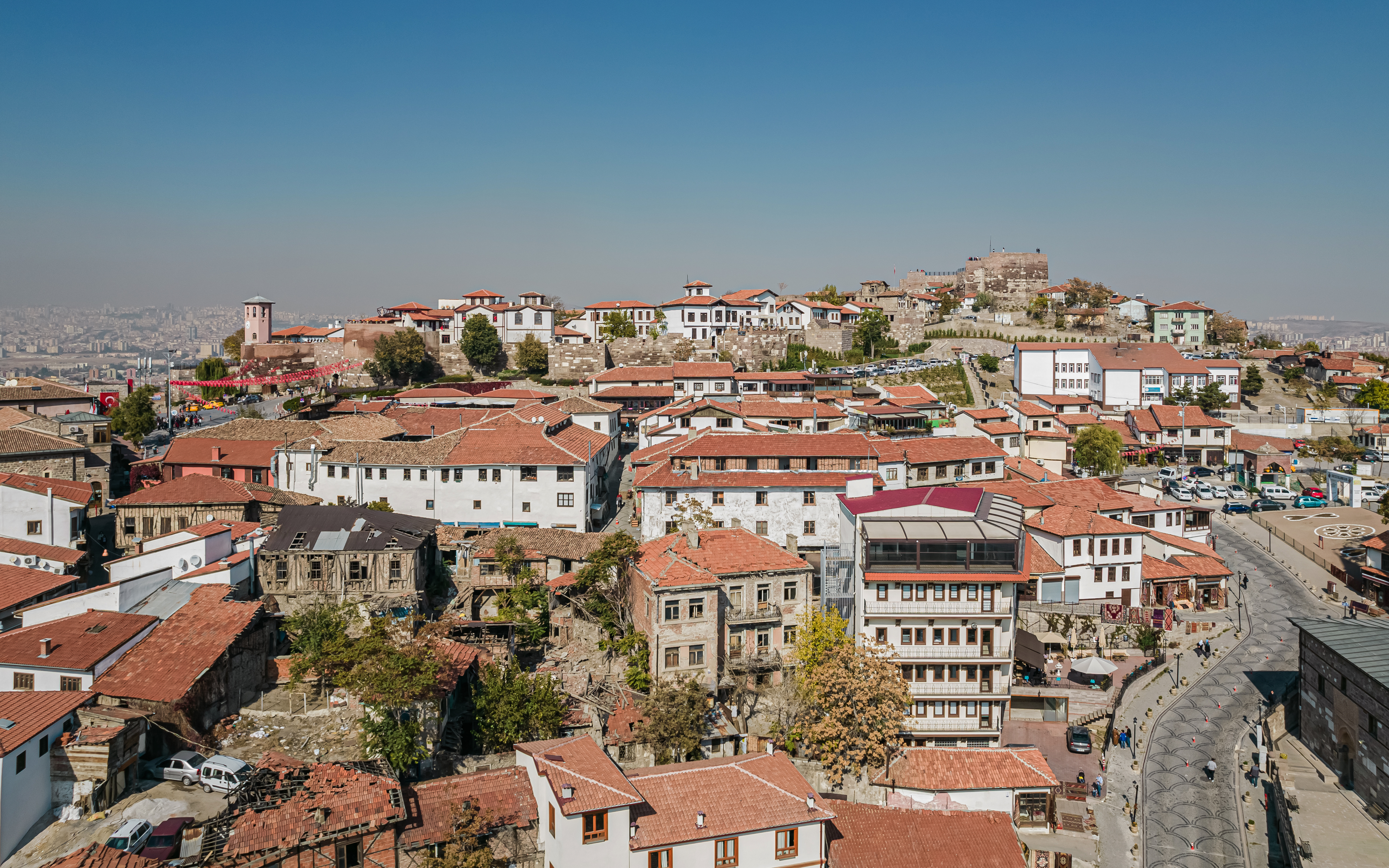
Aerial view of Kale (Altındağ) and the Citadel

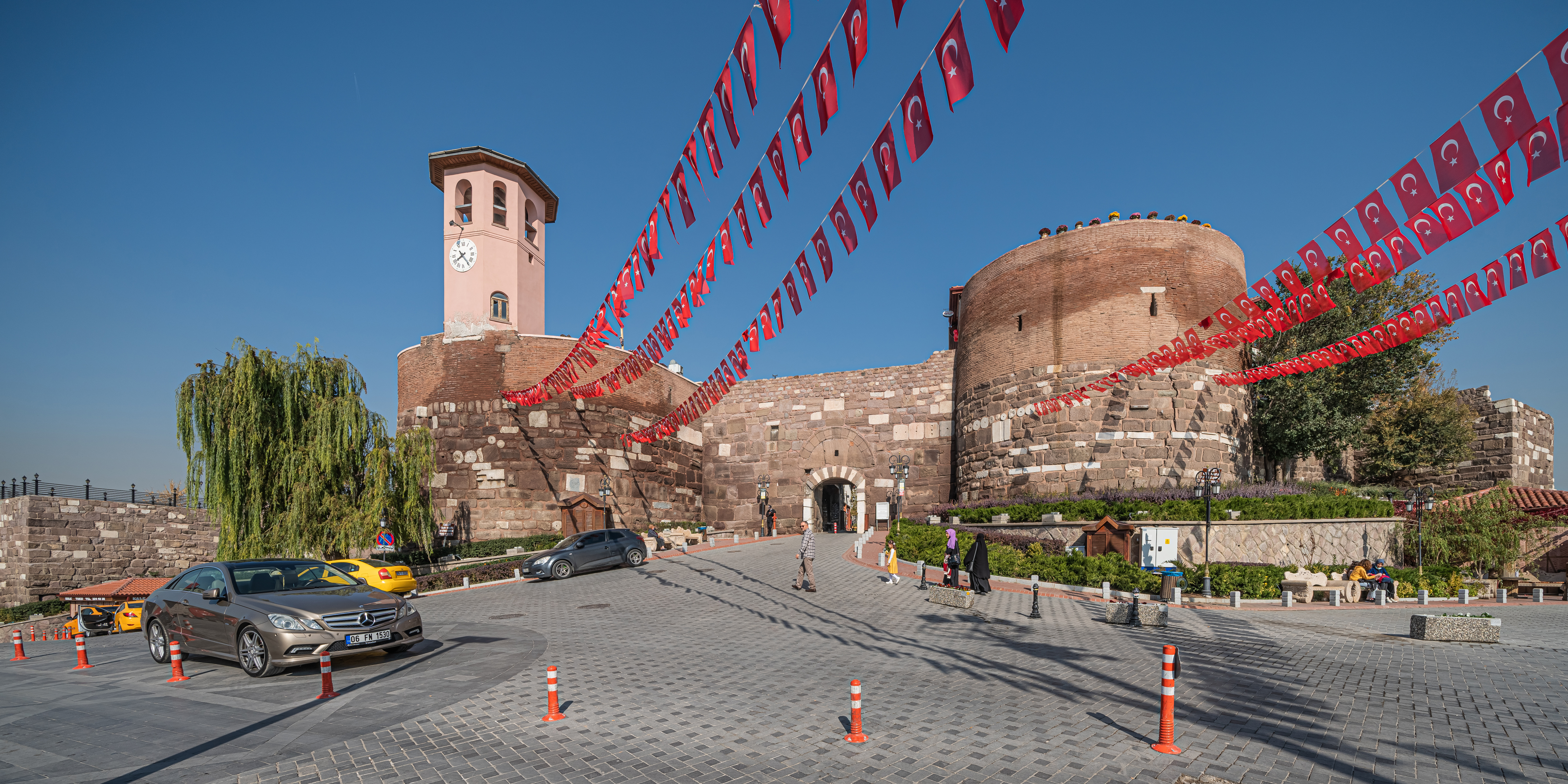
The clock tower and the main gate

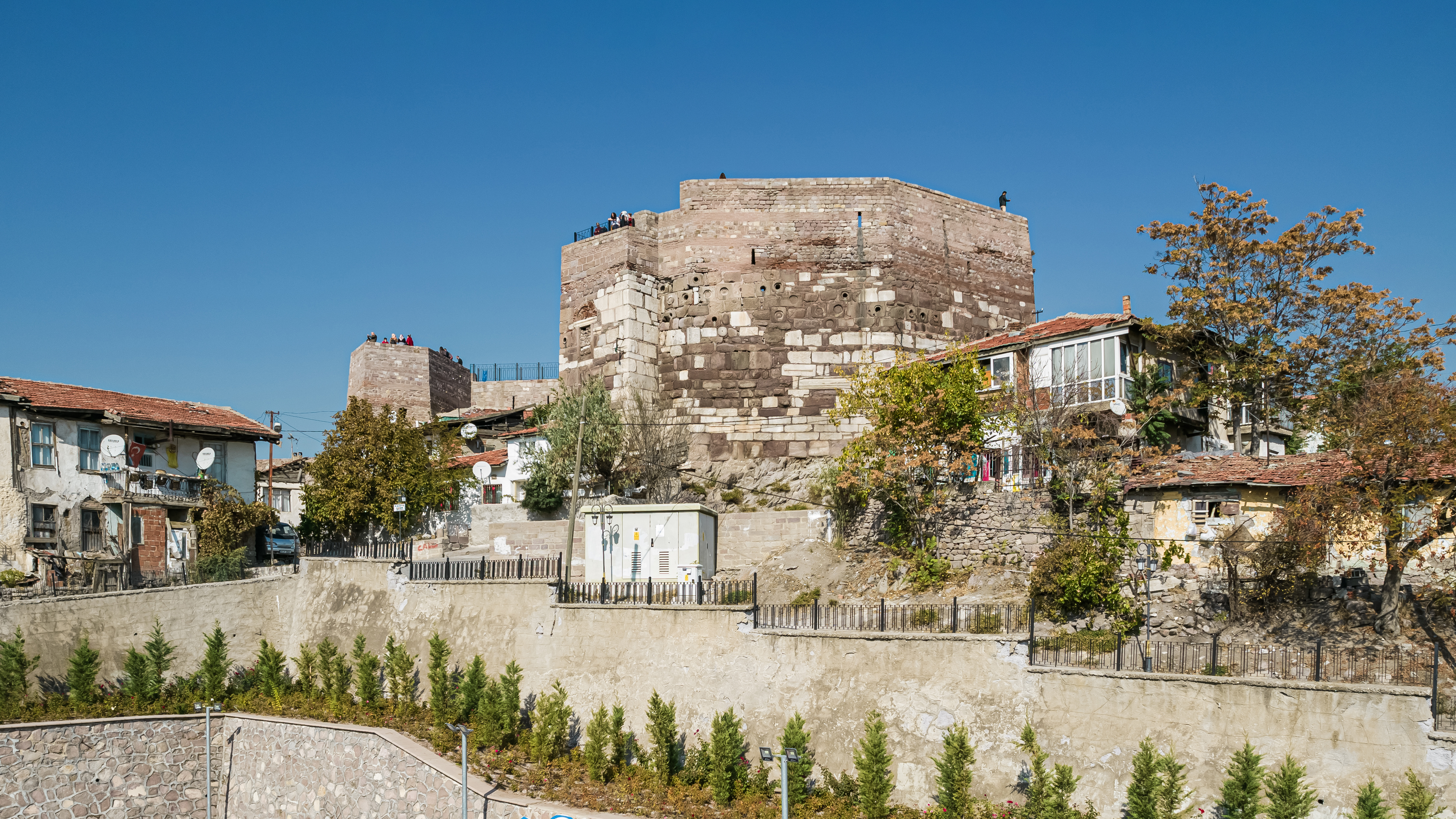
Dungeon Tower

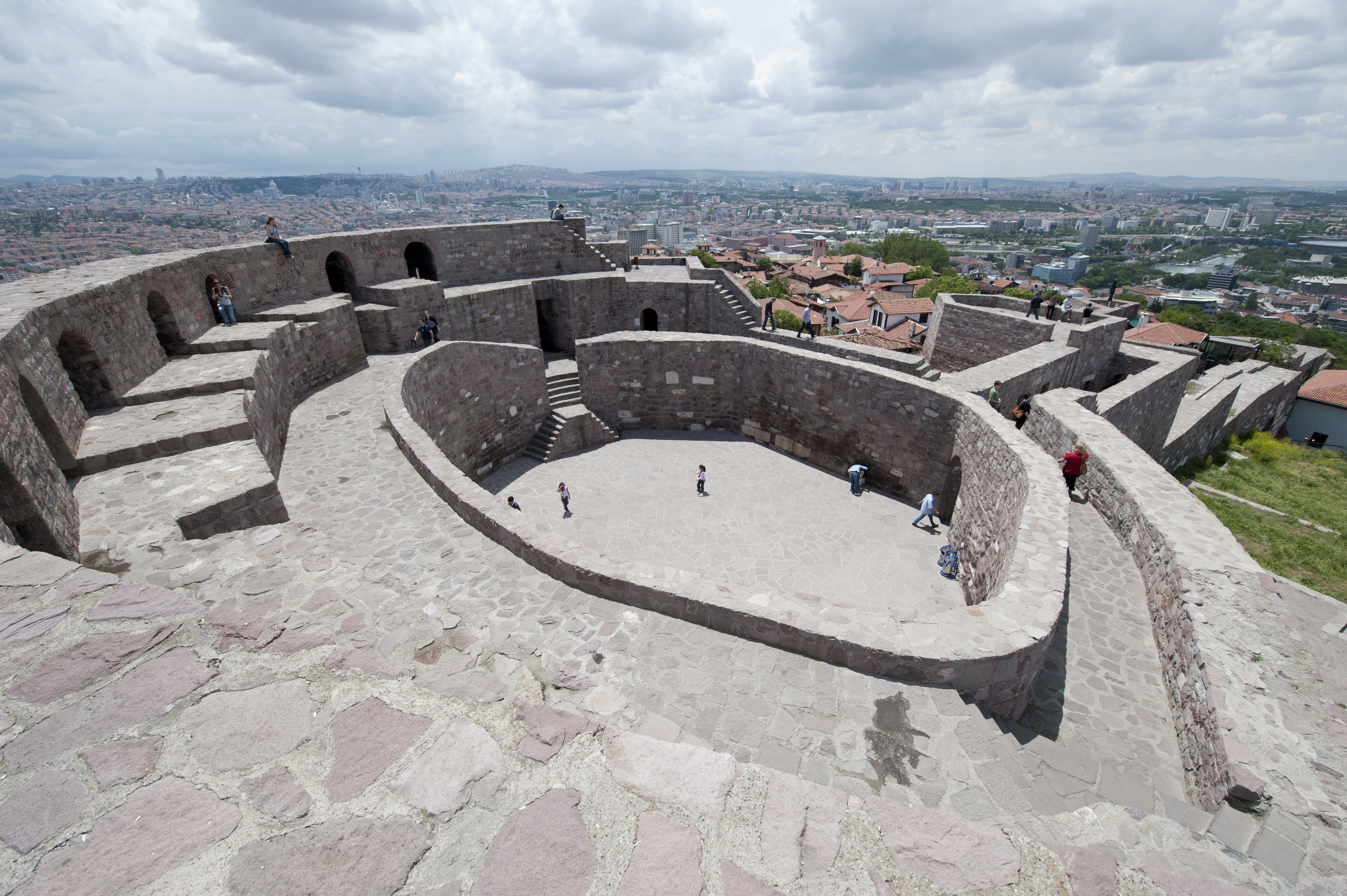
Ankara Castle Eastern Castle

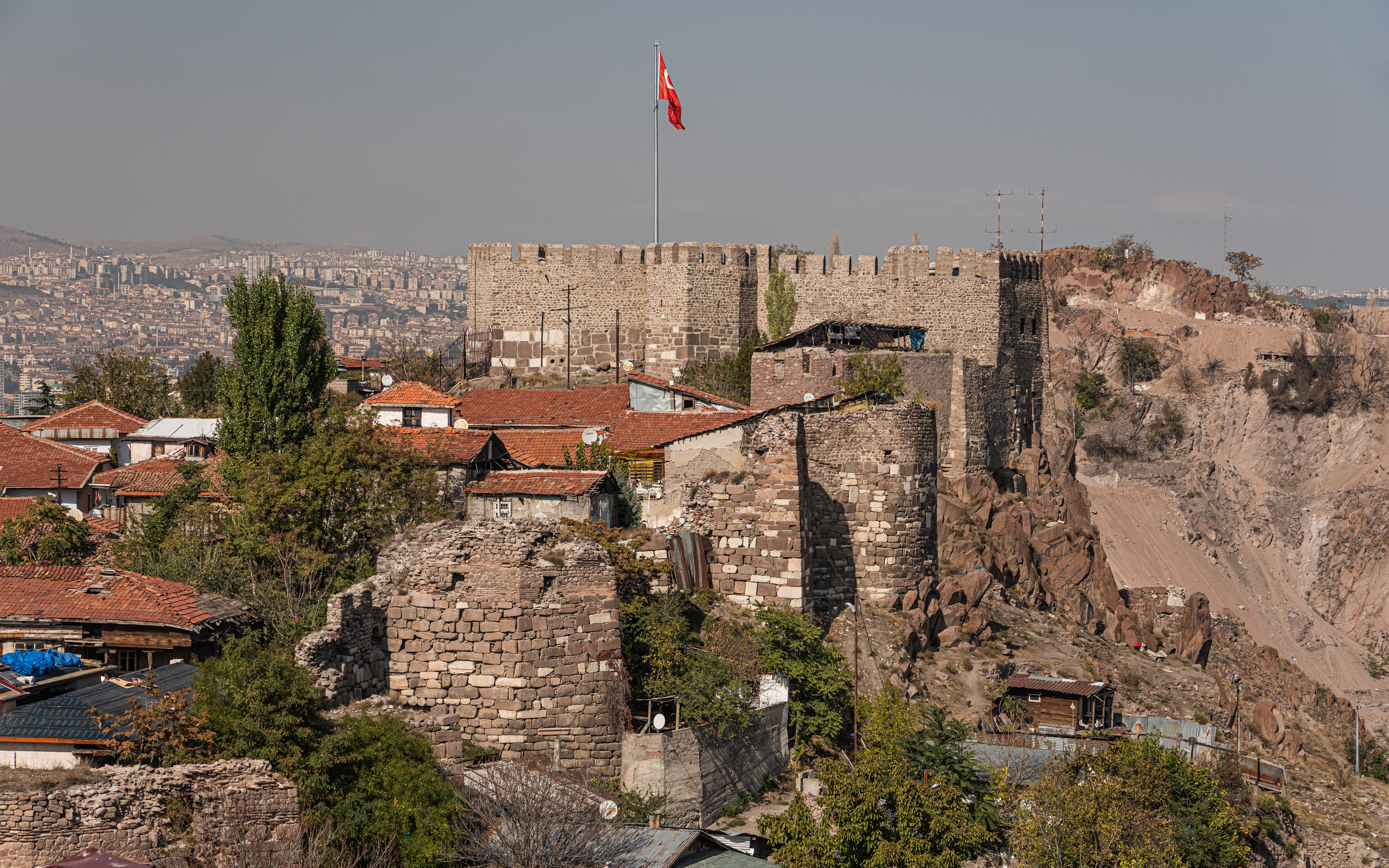
Ak Kale

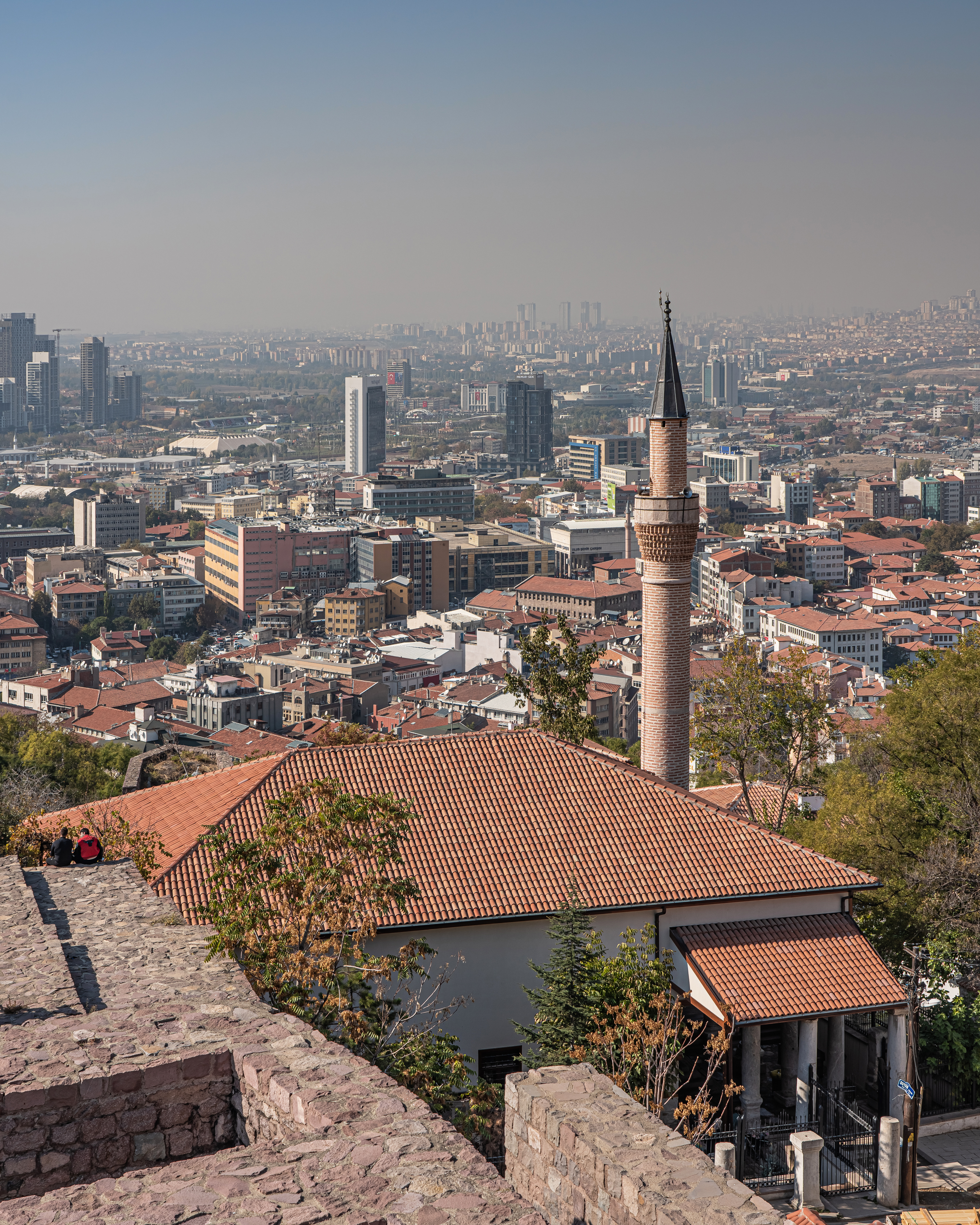
Sultan Alaeddin Mosque

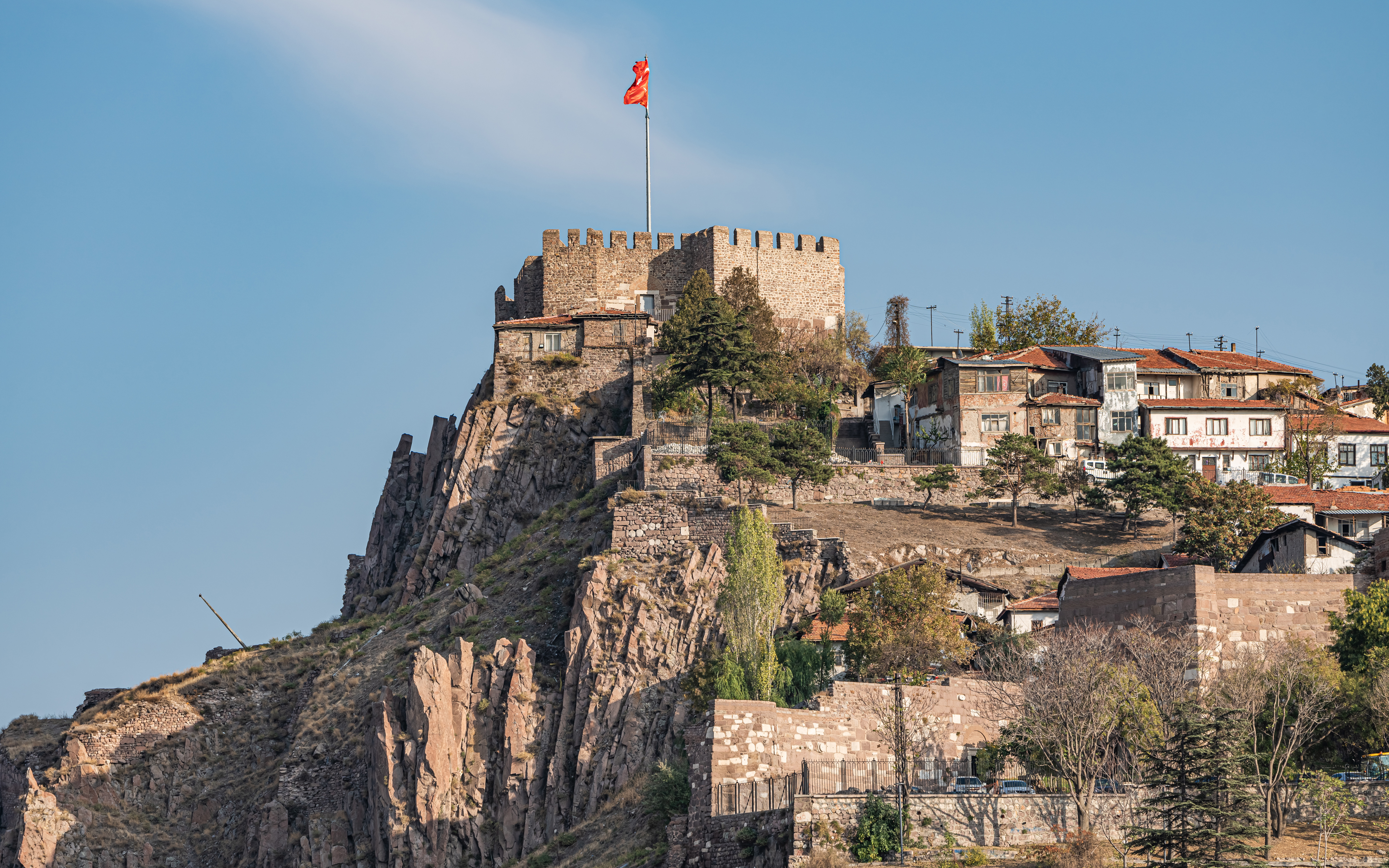
View of the Castle from the Hacı Bayram Mosque Park

== See also ==
- History of Ankara
