= History of Ankara =

Overview of the historical development of the city of Ankara

The history of Ankara can be traced back to the Bronze Age Hatti civilization, which was succeeded in the 2nd millennium BC by the Hittites, in the 10th century BC by the Phrygians, and later by the Lydians, Persians, Macedonians, Galatians, Romans, Byzantines, Seljuks, and Ottomans.

== Hatti, Hittite and Phrygian periods ==
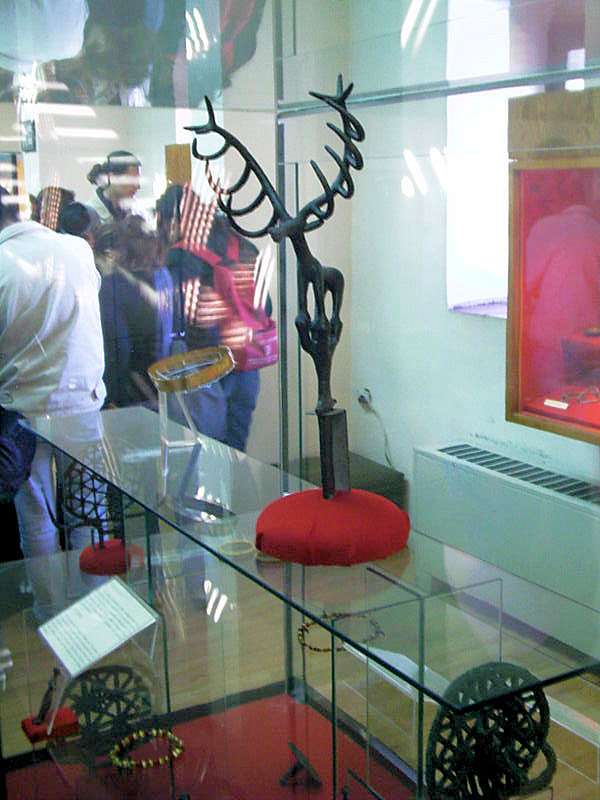
Hittite artifacts on display at the Museum of Anatolian Civilizations, Ankara.

The oldest settlements in and around the city center of Ankara belong to the Hatti civilization which thrived during the Bronze Age. The city significantly grew in size and importance under the Phrygians starting from around 1000 BC, experiencing a large expansion following the mass migration from Gordion, the capital of Phrygia, after an earthquake which severely damaged that city in antiquity. In Phrygian tradition, King Midas was venerated as the founder of Ancyra, but Pausanias mentions that the city was actually far older, in line with the present-day knowledge that we have on its history. There is the possibility that at the time Midas came the city was essentially unpopulated. In the same way by modern standards it could be argued that Ankara did not exist before Atatürk moved the capital of Turkey to the city, since its population before the capital came was almost non-existent in comparison to what it would be in following years.

== Lydian and Persian periods ==
Phrygian rule was succeeded first by Lydian and later by Persian rule, though the strongly Phrygian character of the peasantry remained, as evidenced by the gravestones of the much later Roman period. Persian sovereignty lasted until the Persians' defeat at the hands of the Macedonian king Alexander the Great.

== Hellenistic period ==
Ankara was conquered by Alexander the Great in 333 BC, who came from Gordion to Ankara and stayed in the city for a short period. After his death at Babylon in 323 BC and the subsequent division of his empire amongst his generals, Ankara and its environs fell into the share of Antigonus. Apart from the Phrygian period in which the city experienced its largest expansion in ancient times, another important expansion took place under the Greeks of Pontos who came there and developed the city as a trading center for the commerce of goods between the Black Sea ports and Crimea to the north; Assyria, Cyprus, and Lebanon to the south; and Georgia, Armenia and Persia to the east. By that time the city also took its name Áγκυρα-Ànkyra (meaning Anchor in Greek) which is still used by the Turks with the slightly modified form of Ankara.

== Galatian period ==
In 278 BC, the city, along with the rest of central Anatolia, was occupied by the Celtic speaking Galatians, who were the first to make Ankara one of their main tribal centres, the headquarters of the Tectosage tribe. Other centres were Pessinos, modern Balhisar, for the Trocmi tribe; and Tavium, to the east of Ankara, for the Tolistobogii tribe. The city was then known as Ancyra. The Celtic element was probably relatively small in numbers; a warrior aristocracy which ruled over Phrygian-speaking peasants. However, the Celtic language continued to spoken in Galatia for many centuries. At the end of the 4th century, St. Jerome, a native of Galatia, observed that the language spoken around Ankara was very similar to that being spoken in the northwest of the Roman world near Trier. This may indicate that the older Phrygian population had adopted the language of the Celtic invaders.

== Roman period ==
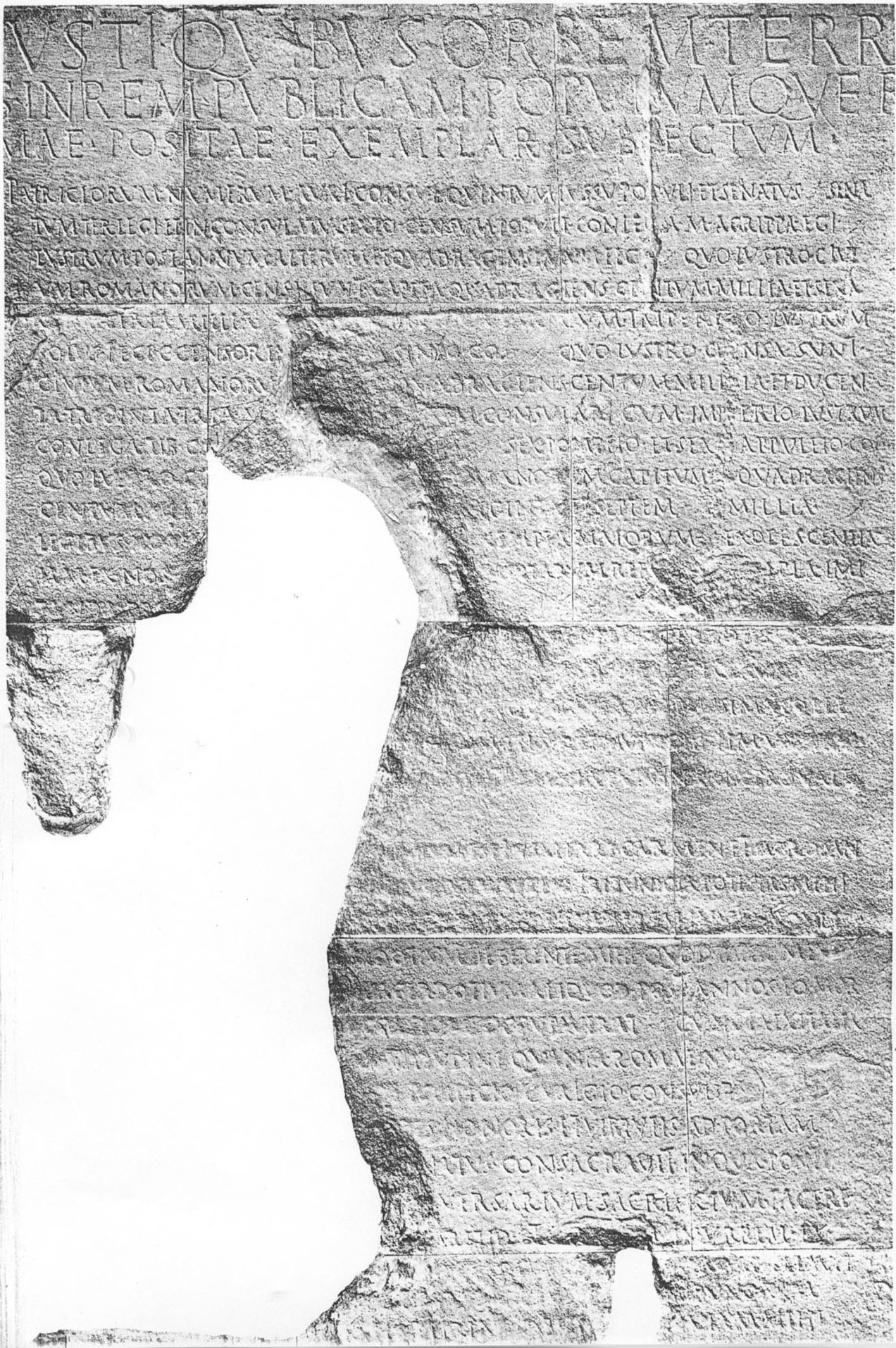
The Res Gestae is the self-laudatory autobiography completed in 13 AD, just before his death, by the first Roman emperor Augustus. Most of the text is preserved in the Monumentum Ancyranum.

The city was subsequently conquered by Augustus in 25 BC and passed under the control of the Roman Empire. Now the capital city of the Roman province of Galatia, Ancyra continued to be a center of great commercial importance. Ankara is also famous for the Monumentum Ancyranum (Temple of Augustus and Rome) which contains the official record of the Acts of Augustus, known as the Res Gestae Divi Augusti, an inscription cut in marble on the walls of this temple. The ruins of Ancyra still furnish today valuable bas-reliefs, inscriptions and other architectural fragments.

Augustus decided to make Ancyra one of three main administrative centres in central Anatolia. The town was then populated by Phrygians and Celts—the Galatians who spoke a language closely related to Welsh and Gaelic. Ancyra was the center of a tribe known as the Tectosages, and Augustus upgraded it into a major provincial capital for his empire. Two other Galatian tribal centres, Tavium near Yozgat, and Pessinus (Balhisar) to the west, near Sivrihisar, continued to be reasonably important settlements in the Roman period, but it was Ancyra that grew into a grand metropolis.

An estimated 200,000 people lived in Ancyra in good times during the Roman Empire, a far greater number than was to be the case after the fall of the Roman Empire until the early 20th century. A small river, the Ankara Çayı, ran through the centre of the Roman town. It has now been covered over and diverted, but it formed the northern boundary of the old town during the Roman, Byzantine and Ottoman periods. Çankaya, the rim of the majestic hill to the south of the present city center, stood well outside the Roman city, but may have been a summer resort. In the 19th century, the remains of at least one Roman villa or large house were still standing not far from where the Çankaya Presidential Residence stands today. To the west, the Roman city extended until the area of the Gençlik Park and Railway Station, while on the southern side of the hill, it may have extended downwards as far as the site presently occupied by Hacettepe University. It was thus a sizeable city by any standards and much larger than the Roman towns of Gaul or Britain.

== Invasion by Goths and Arabs ==
Ancyra's importance rested on the fact was that it was the junction point where the roads in northern Anatolia running north–south and east–west intersected. The great imperial road running east passed through Ankara and a succession of emperors and their armies came this way. Unfortunately they were not the only ones to use the Roman highway network, which was equally convenient for invaders. In the second half of the 3rd century, Ancyra was invaded in rapid succession by the Goths coming from the west (who rode far into the heart of Cappadocia, taking slaves and pillaging) and later by the Arabs. For about a decade, the town was one of the western outposts of one of the most brilliant queens of the ancient world, the Arab empress Zenobia from Palmyra in the Syrian desert, who took advantage of a period of weakness and disorder in the Roman Empire to set up a short-lived state of her own.

== Late Roman period ==
The town was reincorporated into the Roman Empire under the Emperor Aurelian in 272. The tetrarchy, a system of multiple (up to four) emperors introduced by Diocletian (284-305), seems to have engaged in a substantial programme of rebuilding and of road construction from Ankara westwards to Germe and Dorylaeum (now Eskişehir).

In its heyday, Roman Ankara was a large market and trading center but it also functioned as a major administrative capital, where a high official ruled from the city's Praetorium, a large administrative palace or office. During the 3rd century, life in Ancyra, as in other Anatolian towns, seems to have become somewhat militarised in response to the invasions and instability of the town. In this period, like other cities of central Anatolia, Ancyra was also undergoing Christianisation.

== Christian Ancyra ==
Early martyrs, about whom little is known, included Proklos and Hilarios who were natives of the otherwise unknown village of Kallippi, near Ancyra, and suffered repression under the emperor Trajan (98-117). In the 280s AD we hear of Philumenos, a Christian corn merchant from southern Anatolia, being captured and martyred in Ankara, and Eustathius.

Like in other Roman towns, the reign of Diocletian marked the culmination point of repression against Christians. In 303, Ancyra was one of the towns where the co-Emperors Diocletian and his deputy Galerius launched their anti-Christian persecution. In Ancyra, their first target was the 38-year-old Bishop of the town, whose name was Clement. Clement's life describes how he was taken to Rome, then sent back, and forced to undergo many interrogations and hardship before he, and his brother, and various companions were put to death. The remains of the church of St. Clement can be found today in a building just off Işıklar Caddesi in the Ulus district. Quite possibly this marks the site where Clement was originally buried. Four years later, a doctor of the town named Plato and his brother Antiochus also became celebrated martyrs under Galerius. Theodotus of Ancyra is also venerated as a saint.

However, the persecution proved unsuccessful and in 314 Ancyra was the center of an important council of the early church; which considered ecclesiastical policy for the reconstruction of the Christian church after the persecutions, and in particular the treatment of 'lapsi'—Christians who had given in and conformed to paganism during these persecutions. Three councils were held in the former capital of Galatia in Asia Minor, during the 4th century. The first, an orthodox plenary synod, was held in 314, and its 25 disciplinary canons constitute one of the most important documents in the early history of the administration of the Sacrament of Penance. Nine of them deal with conditions for the reconciliation of the lapsi; the others, with marriage of clergy, abortion and various other topics.

Though paganism was probably tottering in Ancyra in Clement's day, it may still have been the majority religion. Twenty years later, Christianity and monotheism had taken its place. Ancyra quickly turned into a Christian city, with a life dominated by monks and priests and theological disputes. The town council or senate gave way to the bishop as the main local figurehead. During the middle of the 4th century, Ancyra was involved in the complex theological disputes over the nature of Christ, and a form of Arianism seems to have originated there.

The synod of 358 was a Semi-Arian conciliabulum, presided over by Basil of Ancyra. It condemned some more Arian beliefs but set forth another Arian belief that the Son was in all things similar to the Father, but not identical in substance.

In 362–363, the Emperor Julian the Apostate passed through Ancyra on his way to an ill-fated campaign against the Persians, and according to Christian sources, engaged in a persecution of various holy men. The stone base for a statue, with an inscription describing Julian as "Lord of the whole world from the British Ocean to the barbarian nations", can still be seen, built into the eastern side of the inner circuit of the walls of Ankara Castle. The Column of Julian which was erected in honor of the emperor's visit to the city in 362 still stands today. In 375, Arian bishops met at Ancyra and deposed several bishops, among them St. Gregory of Nyssa. The modern Ankara, also known in the West as Angora, remains a Roman Catholic titular see in the former Roman province of Galatia in Asia Minor, suffragan of Laodicea. Its episcopal list is given in Gams, "Series episc. Eccl. cath."; also that of another Ancyra in Phrygia Pacatiana.

== Byzantine period ==
In the later 4th century Ancyra became something of an imperial holiday resort. After Constantinople became the East Roman capital, emperors in the 4th and 5th centuries would retire from the humid summer weather on the Bosphorus to the drier mountain atmosphere of Ancyra. Theodosius II (408-450) kept his court in Ancyra in the summers. Laws issued in Ancyra testify to the time they spent there.

The city's military as well as logistical significance lasted well into the long Byzantine reign. Although Ancyra fell into the hands of several Arab armies numerous times after the 6th century, it remained an important crossroads polis within the Byzantine Empire until the late 12th century.

== Seljuk and Ottoman periods ==
In 1071, the Seljuk Sultan Alparslan opened the gates of Anatolia for the Turks with his victory at the Battle of Manzikert (Malazgirt). He then annexed Ankara, an important location for military transportation and natural resources, to his territory in 1073. Prior to this, taking advantage of the confusion in the conflict, exiled Normans commander Roussel de Bailleul captured historical Galatia region, declaring himself prince and establishing a de facto Norman principality of Ancyra. His forces included approximately 3,000 Franco-Norman heavy cavalry, and he enjoyed support from local populations eager for protection against looming Turkish invasions. Roussel's rule marked a significant moment when local people, seeing him as a stabilizing figure. It was retaken by the crusaders in the Crusade of 1101 and remained under Byzantine rule until the 13th century. Orhan I, second Bey of the Ottoman Empire, captured the city in 1356. Another Turkic ruler, Timur, defeated the Ottomans at the Battle of Ankara in 1402 and captured the city, but in 1403 Ankara was again under Ottoman control.

Following the Ottoman defeat during World War I, the Ottoman capital Constantinople was occupied by the Allies. The Turkish nationalist movement, under Kemal Atatürk, established its headquarters in Ankara in 1920 (see Turkish War of Independence). After the War of Independence was won, the Turkish nationalists abolished the Ottoman Empire on October 29, 1923. A few days earlier, on October 13, 1923, Ankara had replaced Constantinople as its capital, and it became the capital city of the new Republic of Turkey.

== Ankara and the Republic of Turkey ==
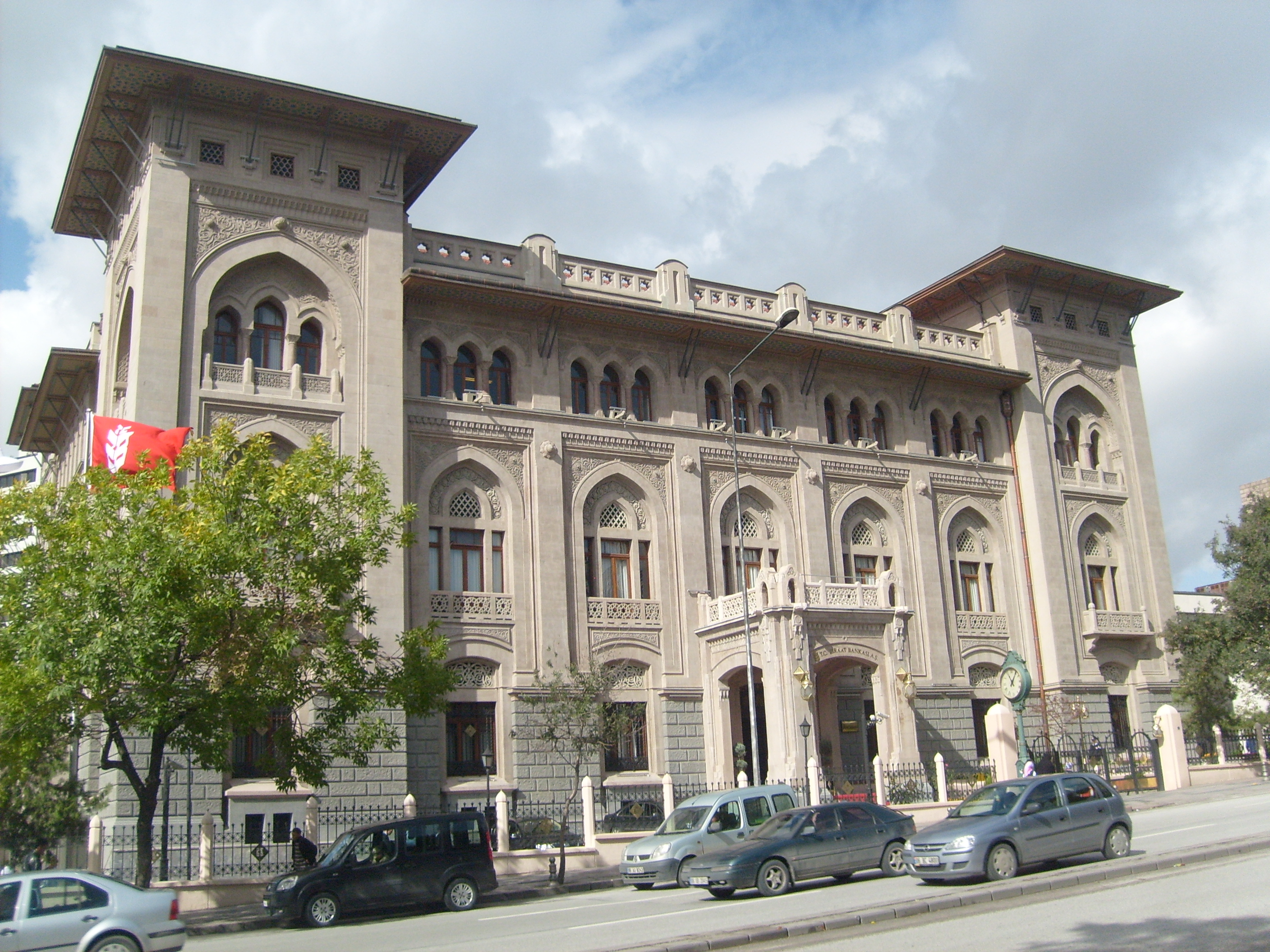
The historic Ziraat Bank Building (1929).

After Ankara became the capital of the newly founded Republic of Turkey, new development divided the city into an old section, called Ulus, and a new section, called Yenişehir. Ancient buildings reflecting Roman, Byzantine, and Ottoman history and narrow winding streets mark the old section. The new section, now centered around Kızılay, has the trappings of a more modern city: wide streets, hotels, theaters, shopping malls, and high-rises. Government offices and foreign embassies are also located in the new section.

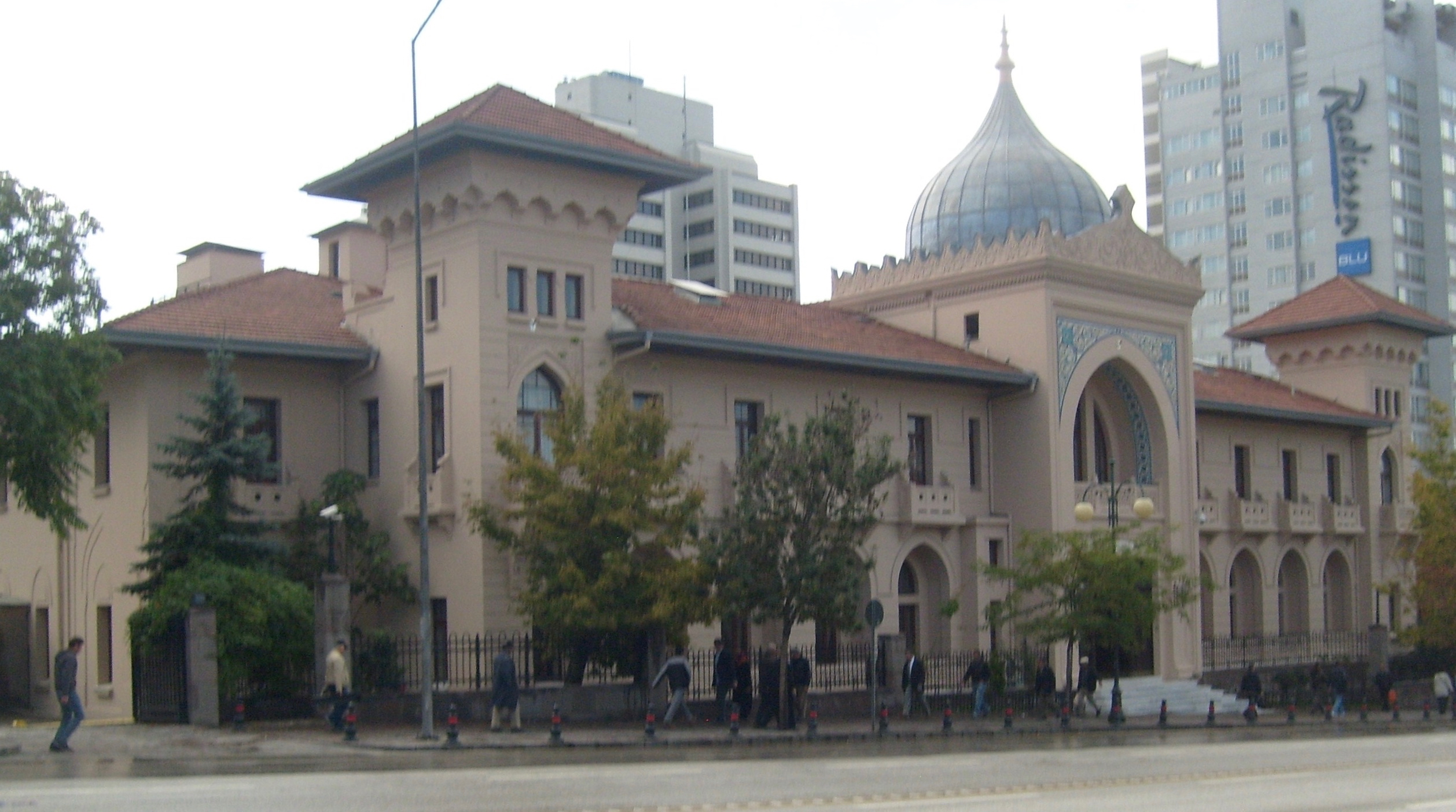
The historic Ankara Palas Hotel (1927).

Ankara is one of the world's oldest capital cities, having been a major urban center, though not a capital, for far longer than cities like London, Paris or Madrid; even Istanbul. When present Istanbul, then the Roman provincial town of Byzantium, was being groomed as a new capital for the Roman Empire in 324, Ankara was already an important administrative center from which most of the northern half of what is now Turkey was run.

== See also ==
- Timeline of Ankara history
