= List of hospitals in Turkey =

This is a list of hospitals in Turkey.

== Adana ==
- Özel Avicenna Ataşehir Hastanesi
- Özel Acıbadem Adana Hastanesi
- Özel Adana Hastanesi
- Özel Adana Metro Hastanesi
- Özel Algomed Hastanesi
- Özel Avrupa Hospital Hastanesi
- Özel Çukurova Göz Hastanesi
- Özel Epc Hastanesi
- Özel Güney Adana Hastanesi
- Özel Medline Adana Hastanesi
- Özel Ortadoğu Hastanesi
- Özel Ortopedia Hastanesi
- Özel Ceyhan Çınar Hastanesi
- Özel Kozan Sevgi Can Hastanesi
- Özel Kozan Kalepark Hastanesi
- Çukurova Üniversitesi Tıp Fakültesi Balcalı Hastanesi
- Başkent Üniversitesi Adana Uygulama ve Araştırma Merkezi
- Avicenna International Hospital
- Adana Devlet Hastanesi
- Adana Numune Eğitim ve Araştırma Hastanesi
- Adana Kadın Doğum ve Çocuk Hastalıkları Hastanesi
- Adana Dr. Ekrem Tok Ruh Sağlığı ve Hastalıkları Hastanesi
- Ceyhan Devlet Hastanesi
- Karaisalı Devlet Hastanesi
- Kozan Devlet Hastanesi
- İmamoğlu Devlet Hastanesi
- Pozantı Devlet Hastanesi
- Tufanbeyli Devlet Hastanesi

== Ankara ==
See List of hospitals in Ankara.

== Antalya ==
- Başkent Üniversitesi Alanya Uygulama ve Araştırma Merkezi
- Memorial Antalya Hospital

== Balıkesir ==
See List of hospitals in Balıkesir.

== Bursa ==
See List of hospitals in Bursa.

== Çanakkale ==
- Çanakkale Devlet Hastanesi

== Denizli ==
- Denizli Devlet Hastanesi

== Diyarbakır ==
- Diyarbakır Devlet Hastanesi
- Diyarbakır Asker Hastanesi

== Erzurum ==
- Erzurum Mareşal Fevzi Çakmak Asker Hastanesi
- Erzurum Bölge Eğitim Araştırma Hastanesi

== Erzincan ==
- Erzincan Devlet Hastanesi
- 13 Şubat Devlet (SSK) Hastanesi

== Eskişehir ==
- Eskisehir Yunusemre Devlet Hastanesi
- Eskişehir Hava Hastanesi
- Osmangazi Universitesi Arastirma Hastanesi
- Anadolu Universitesi Mavi Hastanesi
- Acıbadem Hastanesi
- Ozel Umit Hastanesi

== Istanbul ==
- Emsey Hospital, Pendik
- Acıbadem Hospitals Group
- Bakırköy Psychiatric Hospital
- Balıklı Greek Hospital
- Başakşehir Çam and Sakura City Hospital
- İstanbul Florence Nightingale Hastanesi
- Marmara University Prof. Dr. Asaf Ataseven Hospital
- Memorial Şişli Hospital
- Sancaktepe Prof. Dr. Feriha Öz Emergency Hospital
- Surp Agop Hospital
- Taksim German Hospital
- Yeşilköy Prof. Dr. Murat Dilmener Emergency Hospital
- Avicenna International Hospital, Ataşehir
- Arnavutköy Government Hospital, Arnavutköy
- Batı Bahat Hastanesi, İkitelli
- Düzey Göz Merkezi Istanbul / Avcilar
- Estethica Plastic Surgery Hospitals
- Estetik International Istanbul
- Ethica Hospital
- Gayrettepe Florence Nightingale Hastanesi, Gayrettepe
- Göktürk Florence Nightingale Tıp Merkezi, Göktürk
- Göz Sağlığı Merkezi
- Ivf center in Turkey
- Kadıköy Florence Nightingale Hastanesi, Kadıköy
- Medicana tüp bebek merkezi istanbul
- Memorial Hastanesi Etiler, Ataşehir, Suadiye
- Memorial HIZMET Hospital, Istanbul
- MetropolDoctors, Levent İstanbul
- St Peters Hospital Bakırköy, Istanbul
- Superplast Estetik Cerrahi Merkezi, Nişantaşı İstanbul
- Yaşar Hospital, Bakırköy

== İzmir ==
See List of hospitals in İzmir.

== Kocaeli ==
- Gölcük Deniz Hastanesi
- Gebze Fatih Devlet Hastanesi
- Gebze Devlet Hastanesi
- Özel Gebze Merkez Hastanesi
- Kocaeli Devlet Hastanesi
- Kocaeli Üniversitesi Tıp fakültesi
- özel Yeni yüzyıl hastanesi
- Gebze Tıp merkezi
- Yeşim Tıp Merkezi
- Özel Akademi hastanesi
- Gebze Şifa tıp merkezi

== Konya ==
- SSK Konya Doğumevi ve Çocuk Hastalıkları Hastanesi
- Konya Başkent Hastanesi
- Konya Numune Hastanesi
- Konya Meram Tıp Fakültesi Hastanesi

== Mersin ==
- Mersin University Hospital
- Mersin state Hospital
- Private IMC Hospital
- Private Sistem Tıp Hospital
- Private Doğuş Tanrıöver Hospital
- Private Toros Hospital
- Private Yenişehir Hospital

== Muğla ==
- Muğla Kamu Hastaneleri Birliği
- Muğla Eğitim Araştırma Hastanesi
- Fethiye Devlet Hastanesi
- Milas Devlet Hastanesi
- Bodrum Devlet Hastanesi
- Marmaris Devlet Hastanesi
- Yatağan Devlet Hastanesi
- Köyceğiz Devlet Hastanesi
- Dalaman Devlet Hastanesi
- Ortaca Devlet Hastanesi
- Datça Devlet Hastanesi
- Muğla Ağız ve Diş Sağlığı Merkezi
- Fethiye Ağız ve Diş Sağlığı Merkezi

== Şırnak Province ==
- Şırnak State Hospital

== Nazilli ==
- SSK Nazilli Hastanesi

== Tekirdağ ==
- Çorlu Asker Hastanesi

== Zonguldak ==
- SSK Karadeniz-Ereğli Hastanesi, Karadeniz-Ereğli, Özel Anadolu Hastanesi, Karadeniz-Ereğli

== Others ==
- City Hospital
- Çağıner Hastanesi
- Diomed Hastanesi
- Dr. Zekai Tahir Burak Kadın Hastanesi
- Florence Nightingale Avrupa Hospital, Şişli
- Florence Nightingale Hospital, Çağlayan
- Florence Nightingale Metropolitan Hospital, Gayrettepe
- Florence Nightingale Hospital, Göktürk
- Göz Sağlığı Merkezi
- KBB Tıp Merkezi
- Medline Sağlık Hizmetleri
- Oltu Devlet Hastanesi
- Özel Derman Polikliniği
- Özel Güneş Hastanesi
- Yenikent State Hospital
- T.C. Ziraat Bankası Hastanesi
- Turgut Özal Tıp Merkezi KBB Anabilim Dalı
- Universal Hospital
