= Elvan Işık Gezmiş =

Turkish pharmacist and politician

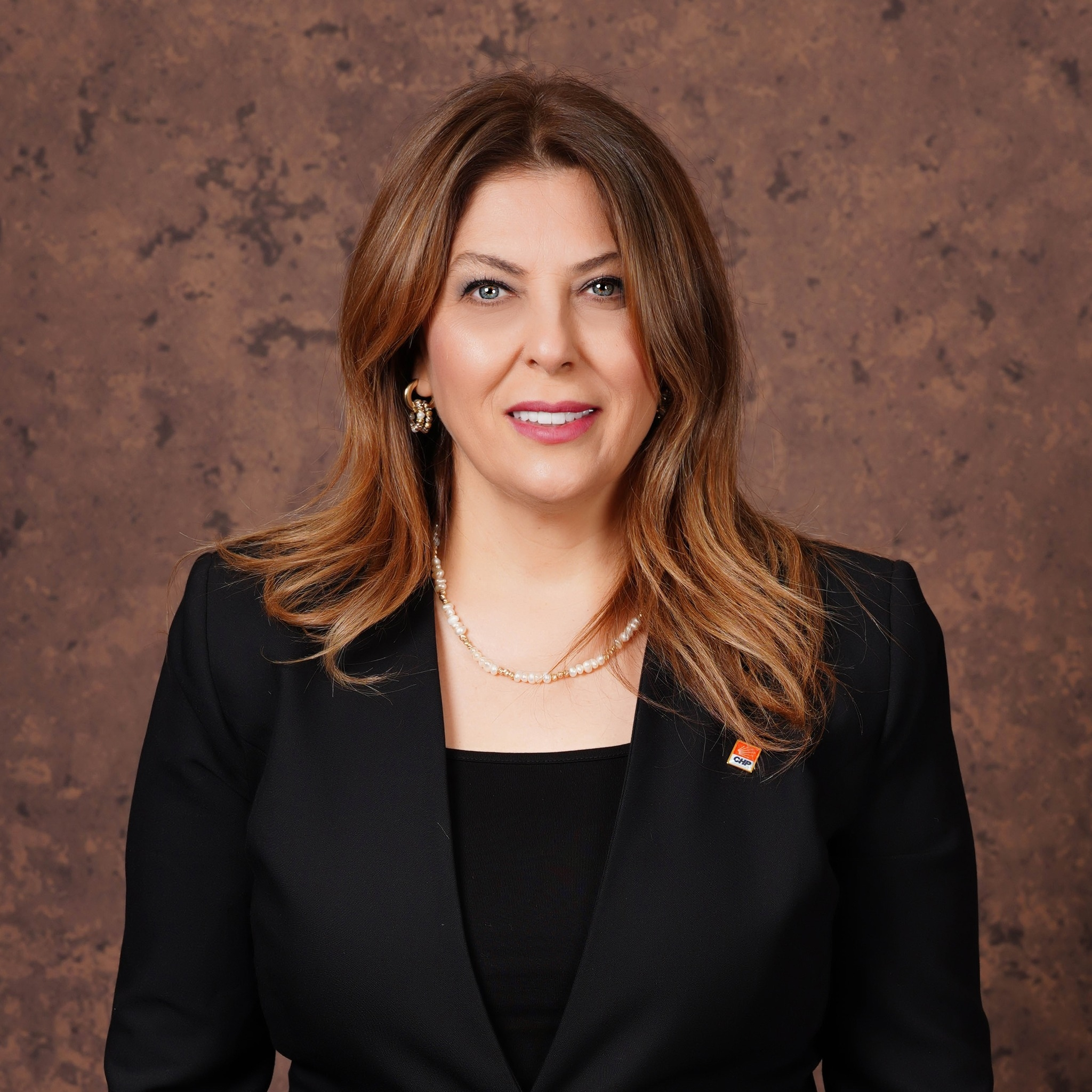

Member of the 28th Parliament of Turkey
- Incumbent
- Assumed office 2 June 2023
- Constituency: Giresun (2023)

Personal details
- Born: 23 October 1974 (age 51) Trabzon, Turkey
- Party: 2023–2026 Republican People's Party (CHP); 2026– New Party (YP)

Elvan Işık Gezmiş (born 23 October 1974, Trabzon) is a Turkish pharmacist and politician, serving as a deputy of the Republican People's Party in the 28th Grand National Assembly of Turkey.

== Biography ==
Elvan Işık Gezmiş was born in 1974. Her father—Mehmet Işık, is one of the former mayors of Giresun and 22nd term Giresun deputy; her mother is Tülay Işık. She completed his secondary education at Giresun High School. She graduated from Marmara University Faculty of Pharmacy and Istanbul University Faculty of Literature Department of Sociology. She studied English language for one year at Durham Technical Community College Language School in North Carolina, United States.

Since 1998, she has worked as a pharmacist in Giresun. She served in Giresun Chamber of Pharmacists, Turkish Pharmacists Association Women Pharmacists Working Group and Women Leadership Academy, Giresun Chamber of Commerce and Industry Women Entrepreneurs Board and Atatürkist Thought Association.

=== Political career ===
Since 1998, she has served as Youth Branch, Women's Branch Provincial Vice President, Central District Vice President, Provincial Vice President in CHP Giresun Provincial Presidency.

In the 2023 Turkish general elections, she became the CHP's Giresun 1st place deputy candidate. She entered the 28th term of the Turkish Grand National Assembly as a deputy and became the first female deputy representing Giresun. She was appointed as the CHP's clerk member in the Grand National Assembly.

=== New Party ===
The 38th Ordinary Congress in November 2023 and the 21st Extraordinary Congress in April 2025 of the Republican People's Party (CHP) were ordered by a court to be annulled due to a ruling of "absolute nullity" issued in the lawsuit. As a result of the court order, interim suspension of the elected party leader Özgür Özel and the party leadership occurred, and Kemal Kılıçdaroğlu and the party bodies existing prior to the congress were restored and continued to perform their duties. As the court-appointed leadership did not set an appropriate early new congress date, the founding of a new party became inevitable for a fraction of the party. 91 CHP parliamentarians, among them Gezmiş, resigned from their party, and founded the New Party on 24 July 2026.
