= Yeşilköy Prof. Dr. Murat Dilmener Emergency Hospital =

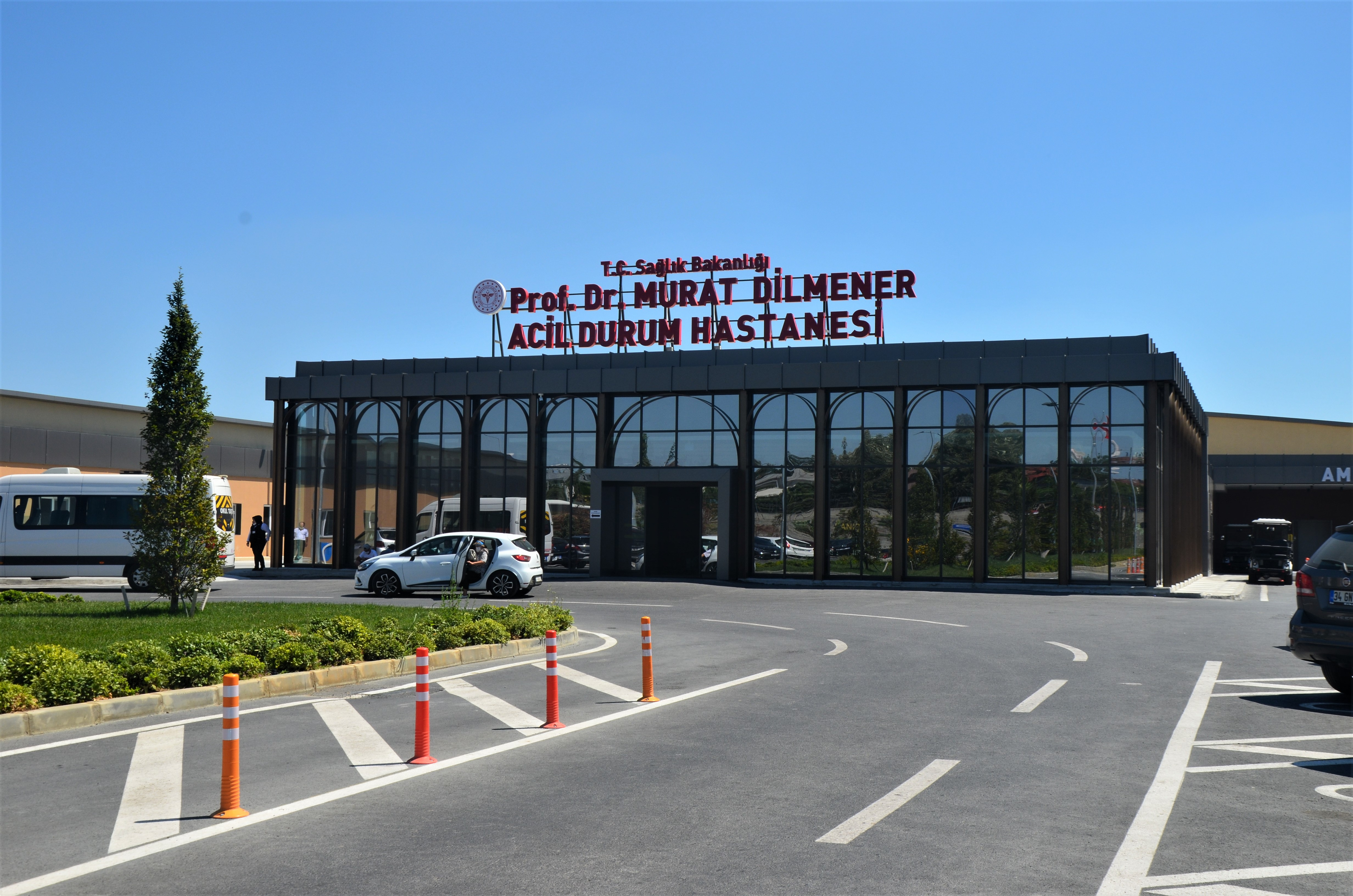
- Main building of Yeşilköy Prof. Dr. Murat Dilmener Emergency Hospital in Istanbul, Turkey

- Location of the hospital in Istanbul, Turkey

Geography
- Location: Istanbul Atatürk Airport, Yeşilköy, Bakırköy, Istanbul, Turkey
- Coordinates: 40°58′17″N 28°48′33″E

Organisation
- Type: Emergency
- Patron: Ministry of Health

Services
- Emergency department: Yes
- Beds: 1,008

History
- Constructed: 9 April 2020
- Opened: 31 May 2020; 6 years ago

Links
- Lists: Hospitals in Turkey

Yeşilköy Prof. Dr. Murat Dilmener Emergency Hospital (Turkish: Yeşilköy Prof. Dr. Murat Dilmener Acil Durum Hastanesi, commonly referred to as Yeşilköy Emergency Hospital), is a hospital in Yeşilköy neighborhood of Bakırköy district in Istanbul Province, Turkey for use in emergency situations like pandemics, epidemics or earthquakes. It was opened in end May 2020.

== History ==
The construction of two large-size emergency hospitals in Istanbul Province was planned soon after the confirmation of the first COVID-19 pandemic case in Turkey. The emergency hospitals, one on Istanbul's European part and the other on the Asian part, with a bed capacity of around 1,000 each were to be situated on the ground of airports and to be built within 45 days only.

The groundbreaking of Yeşilköy Emergency Hospital took place on 9 April 2020. The hospital was inaugurated on 31 May 2020 after completion of the construction and the outfitting works in 52 days from the groundbreaking. It is a type of field hospital, however it has a permanent status and not as the commonly known field hospitals being temporary.

The hospital was named after Murat Dilmener (1942–2020), a physician and former professor at the Istanbul University Cerrahpaşa Faculty of Medicine, who died from COVID-19 pandemic.

== Location and characteristics ==
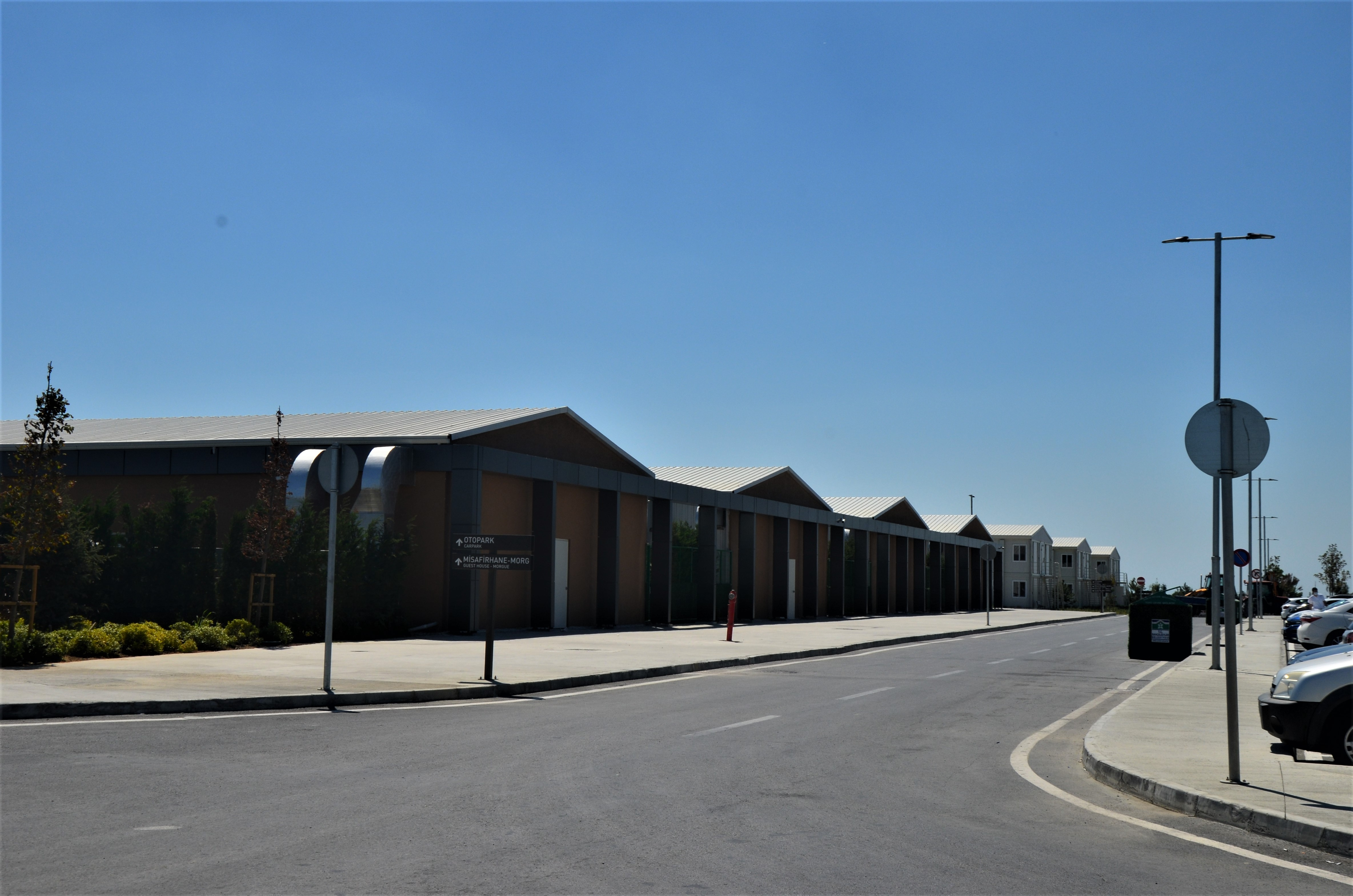
Wings of the Yeşilköy Prof. Dr. Murat Dilmener Emergency Hospital in Istanbul, Turkey.

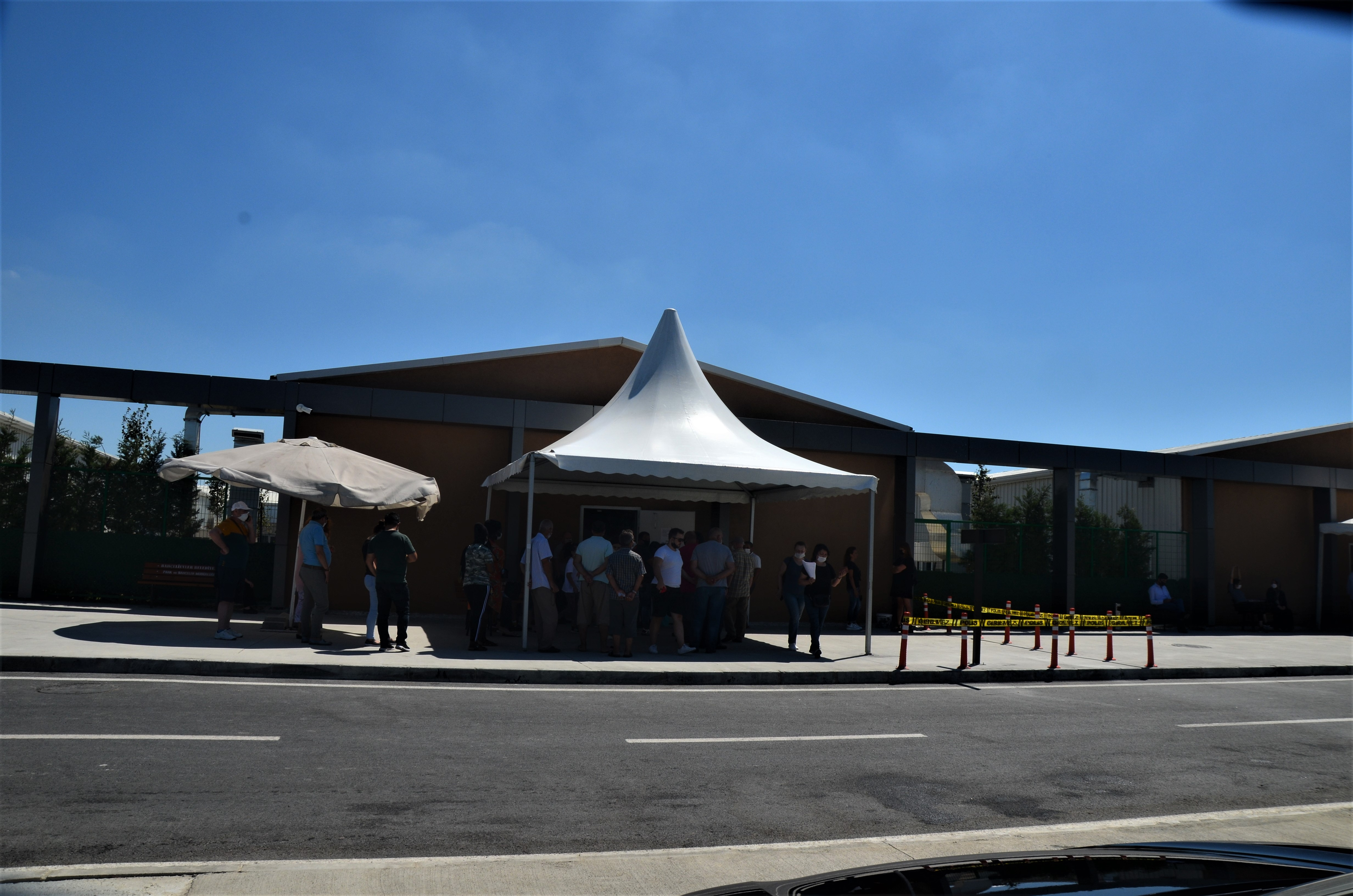
Patients waiting for COVID-19 testing at the entrance of Yeşilköy Emergency Hospital in Yeşilköy, Istanbul, Turkey

The hospital is situated on the ground of Istanbul Atatürk Airport in Yeşilköy neighborhood of Bakırköy district on the European part of Istanbul Province. The one-story building of 75,000 m^{2} (810,000 sq ft) covered space occupies 125,000 m^{2} (1,350,000 sq ft) land area. The hospital features 1,008 hospital beds in total, 576 hospital bedrooms with bath, 432 intensive care beds including 36 installed with dialysis and intensive care equipment, 36 emergency medical hold beds, eight triage rooms, 16 operating theaters, two CRP rooms, four tomography rooms, four MR rooms and two X-ray rooms. The hospital has a parking lot capable of 500 vehicles.

== See also ==
- Sancaktepe Prof. Dr. Feriha Öz Emergency Hospital
