= Marmara University Prof. Dr. Asaf Ataseven Hospital =

Geography
- Location: Maltepe, Istanbul, Turkey
- Coordinates: 40.950624°N 29.138468°E

Organisation
- Type: Teaching, District General
- Affiliated university: Marmara University

Services
- Beds: 535

History
- Opened: 20 June 2020; 6 years ago

Links
- Lists: Hospitals in Turkey

Marmara University Prof. Dr. Asaf Ataseven Hospital (Turkish: Marmara Üniversitesi Prof. Dr. Asaf Ataseven Hastanesi) is a public hospital in Maltepe district of Istanbul, Turkey. It was opened in June 2020.

== History ==
The hospital was initially projected as the second healthcare facility of the Marmara University with a total interior floorspace of 113 daa (113,000 m^{2}) to have 60 hospital beds. Its construction began on 7 October 1991, but continued many years with interruptions. In 2018, Marmara University signed a protocol of affiliation with the Ministry of Health. The project was revised to comply with the Health Ministry's regulations in force.

The hospital was partly opened in April 2020 for the treatment of COVID-19 patients only. The official inauguration following the completion took place on 20 June 2020. Named in the beginning Ministry of Health Marmara University Hospital (Turkish: Sağlık Bakanlığı Marmara Üniversitesi Hastanesi), it was renamed after Asaf Ataseven (1932–2008), a general surgeon and academic.

== Location ==
It is located in Maltepe district on the Asian part of Istanbul Province facing the D-100 highway and taking the advantage of the Sabiha Gökçen International Airport and the M4 metro line.

== Characteristics ==
The hospital building has a total interior floorspace of 113 daa (113,000 m^{2}). It is constructed on a base of 827 seismic base isolators, designed to withstand earthquakes without disruptions to service.

It features 155 clinics, 28 operating theaters and a total of 535 beds, including 60 intensive care unit (ICU) beds and 304 single-room beds.
