= Giresun (electoral district) =

Electoral district for the Grand National Assembly of Turkey

Coordinates: 37°50′N 34°45′E

- electoral district for the Grand National Assembly of Turkey
- Giresun shown within Turkey
- Province: Giresun
- Electorate: 309,800

Current electoral district
- Created: 1923
- Seats: 4 Historical: 5 (1999–2011)
- Turnout at last election: 85.25%
- Representation
- AK Party: 2 / 4
- CHP: 1 / 4
- MHP: 1 / 4

Giresun is an electoral district of the Grand National Assembly of Turkey. It elects four members of parliament (deputies) to represent the province of the same name for a four-year term by the D'Hondt method, a party-list proportional representation system.

== Members ==
Population reviews of each electoral district are conducted before each general election, which can lead to certain districts being granted a smaller or greater number of parliamentary seats.

MPs for Giresun, 1999 onwards
| Election | 1999 (21st Parliament) | 2002 (22nd Parliament) | 2007 (23rd Parliament) | 2011 (24th Parliament) | June 2015 (25th Parliament) |
| MP | Burhan Kara; ANAP | Nurettin Canikli; AK Party | | | Turhan Alçelik; AK Party |
| MP | Hasan Akgün; DSP | Hasan Aydın; AK Party | Hacı Hasan Sünmez; AK Party | Adem Tatlı; AK Party | |
| MP | Rasim Zaimoğlu; DYP | Ali Temür; AK Party | | Mehmet Geldi; AK Party | Orhan Erzurum; MHP |
| MP | Turhan Alçelik; Virtue | Adem Tatlı; AK Party | Eşref Karaibrahim; CHP | Selahattin Karaahmetoğlu; CHP | Bülent Yener Bektaşoğlu; CHP |
| MP | Mustafa Yaman; MHP | Mehmet Işık; CHP | Murat Özkan; MHP | No seat | |

== General elections ==
=== 2011 ===
2011 general election: Giresun
| Party | Candidate | Votes | % | ±% |
|---|---|---|---|---|
| AK Party | 3 elected 0: 1. Nurettin Canikli ✓; 2. Mehmet Geldi ✓; 3. Adem Tatlı ✓; 4. Şengül Şahin ✗ | 154,385 | 59.38 | ▲8.10 |
| CHP | 3 elected 0: 1. Selahattin Karaahmetoğlu ✓; 2. Aykut Gezmiş ✗; 3. Bülent Yener Bektaşoğlu ✗; 4. Nılay Pınar ✗ | 61,579 | 23.69 | ▲7.51 |
| MHP | None elected ▼1: 1. Murat Özkan ✗; 2. Ali Akgün ✗; 3. Nihat Yirmibeş ✗; 4. Savaş Yaman ✗ | 30,966 | 11.91 | ▼4.07 |
| SAADET | None elected: 1. Süleyman Tekbaş ✗; 2. Ömer Öztürk ✗; 3. Davut Tepeyurt ✗; 4. Musa Çakı ✗ | 4,329 | 1.67 | ▼0.75 |
| HAS Party | None elected: 1. Mehmet Başer ✗; 2. Mustafa Kahyaoğlu ✗; 3. Sami Kadıoğlu ✗; 4. Kaya Erdemir ✗ | 2,576 | 0.99 | ▲0.99 |
| DP | None elected: 1. Erdoğan Türkoğlu ✗; 2. Cem Turan ✗; 3. Mustafa Şahin ✗; 4. Abdulkadir Bayram ✗ | 1,953 | 0.75 | ▼3.14 |
| Büyük Birlik | None elected: 1. Ömer Anaç ✗; 2. Haydar Uzun ✗; 3. Erkan Ersan ✗; 4. Murat Öksüz ✗ | 1,127 | 0.43 | ▲0.43 |
| HEPAR | None elected: 1. Sezai Cengiz ✗; 2. Orhan Patan ✗; 3. Sabire Toraman ✗; 4. Hüseyin Yılmaz ✗ | 596 | 0.23 | ▲0.23 |
| DSP | None elected: 1. Mehmet Turan ✗; 2. Hüseyin Olgun ✗; 3. Yılmaz Varol ✗; 4. Ferhat Haliloğlu ✗ | 559 | 0.22 | N/A |
| Labour | None elected: 1. Halit Keskin ✗; 2. Orhan Kara ✗; 3. Coşkun Özbucak ✗; 4. Yusuf Ziya Batuk ✗ | 525 | 0.20 | ▼0.07 |
| DYP | None elected: 1. Yusuf Altınbaş ✗; 2. Tolga Ümit Aytekin ✗; 3. Rifat Arslan ✗; 4. Selami Çiftçi ✗ | 518 | 0.20 | ▲0.20 |
| Nationalist Conservative | None elected: 1. Ülfet Özdemir ✗; 2. Fatma Genç ✗; 3. Bahadır Aydın ✗; 4. Orhan Mumcu ✗ | 285 | 0.11 | ▲0.11 |
| TKP | None elected: 1. Hasan Ali Güngör ✗; 2. Eriş Karanlık ✗; 3. Recep Gül ✗; 4. Evrim Çelik ✗ | 255 | 0.10 | ▼0.09 |
| MP | None elected: 1. Aydoğan Dede ✗; 2. Yaşar Çakır ✗; 3. İbrahim Yalçınkaya ✗; 4. Özcan Şentürk ✗ | 194 | 0.07 | ▲0.07 |
| Liberal Democrat | None elected: 1. Ali Sami Gonca ✗; 2. Mert Mustafa Yücel ✗; 3. Cenk Meşeli ✗; 4. Pınar Gülay Kalender ✗ | 144 | 0.06 | ▼0.11 |
| Total votes | | 259,991 | 100.00 | |
| Rejected ballots | | 4,959 | 1.88 | ▲0.57 |
| Turnout | | 264,099 | 85.25 | ▲2.11 |

=== June 2015 ===
| Abbr. | Party | Votes | % |
|---|---|---|---|
| AK Party | Justice and Development Party | 139,893 | 53.6% |
| CHP | Republican People's Party | 57,313 | 22% |
| MHP | Nationalist Movement Party | 48,374 | 18.5% |
| SP | Felicity Party | 6,391 | 2.4% |
| | Other | 9,017 | 3.5% |
| Total | | 260,988 | |
| Turnout | | 83.18 | |
source: YSK

=== November 2015 ===
| Abbr. | Party | Votes | % |
|---|---|---|---|
| AK Party | Justice and Development Party | 165,268 | 61.8% |
| CHP | Republican People's Party | 53,532 | 20% |
| MHP | Nationalist Movement Party | 38,312 | 14.3% |
| SP | Felicity Party | 2,281 | 0.9% |
| | Other | 8,137 | 3% |
| Total | | 267,350 | |
| Turnout | | 84.82 | |
source: YSK

=== 2018 ===
| Abbr. | Party | Votes | % |
|---|---|---|---|
| AK Party | Justice and Development Party | 149,135 | 52.7% |
| CHP | Republican People's Party | 49,930 | 17.7% |
| IYI | Good Party | 41,343 | 14.6% |
| MHP | Nationalist Movement Party | 30,280 | 10.7% |
| SP | Felicity Party | 3,542 | 1.3% |
| HDP | Peoples' Democratic Party | 2,983 | 1.1% |
| | Other | 5,650 | 2% |
| Total | | 282,863 | |
| Turnout | | 86.81 | |
source: YSK

== Presidential elections ==
=== 2014 ===
2014 presidential election: Giresun
| Party | Candidate | Votes | % |
|---|---|---|---|
| AK Party | Recep Tayyip Erdoğan | 159,171 | 66.64 |
| Independent | Ekmeleddin İhsanoğlu | 76,300 | 31.94 |
| HDP | Selahattin Demirtaş | 3,379 | 1.41 |
| Total votes | | 238,850 | 100.00 |
| Rejected ballots | | 4,851 | 1.99 |
| Turnout | | 243,701 | 75.25 |
| Recep Tayyip Erdoğan win | | | |
