= Timeline of the COVID-19 pandemic in Turkey =

Sequence of major events in ongoing COVID-19 viral pandemic in Turkey

This article documents the timeline of the COVID-19 pandemic in Turkey.

== January 2020 ==
=== 10 January ===
The Ministry of Health set up the Coronavirus Scientific Advisory Board. It consists of 26 members specialized in Chest Diseases, Infectious Diseases and Clinical Microbiology. The number of board members increased later to 31 with the joining of expert academics in Virology, Internal medicine and Intensive care medicine. The board works out guidelines for the treatment by medicals and measures to be followed by the public, and updates them in context of the disease's course in the country.

=== 24 January ===
- On 24 January 2020, Turkey's health ministry installed thermal cameras at the airports.
- The ministry also decided to subject any passengers arriving from China to additional screenings and quarantine anyone showing the symptoms of the coronavirus infection.
  - The screenings were later expanded to include countries that reported a high number of confirmed cases.
- Other precautionary measures on the airports included infrared guns, disinfection at all customs gates and the handing out of free surgical masks and instruction leaflets.

=== 31 January ===
- On 31 January, the Turkish government sent a plane to airlift 34 Turkish citizens and several others from Wuhan. The others include seven Azeris, seven Georgians and one Albanian.
- China ordered 200 million masks from Turkey in addition to Turkey's yearly production of 150 million masks.

== February 2020 ==
=== 3 February ===
- On 3 February, Turkey announced a stop of all the flights from China.
- The border with Iran was closed after the Iranian authorities didn't adhere to the advice of Turkey to quarantine the Iranian city of Qom.
- On the same day, Turkey announced its decision to stop all flights to and from Iran.

=== 29 February ===
- On 29 February, Turkey announced the termination of all flights to and from Italy, South Korea and Iraq.
- Soon after, the border with Iraq was also closed. The ministry also established field hospitals near the Iraq and Iran borders.

== March 2020 ==
=== 8 March ===
- Turkish cities carried out massive disinfection work in public places and mass transit vehicles. In Istanbul, the municipality decided to install hand sanitizers at stations of metrobuses.
- The Ministry of National Education also announced that they were using special disinfectants to keep schools clean against the virus threat. Minister Ziya Selçuk said that every surface open to contact at the schools is being sanitised, noting that vocational schools producing 100 tons of disinfectants daily supply the disinfectants for schools.

=== 11 March ===
- In the early hours of 11 March 2020 (UTC+03:00), Health Minister Fahrettin Koca announced that a Turkish man who had contracted the virus while travelling in Europe was the country's first coronavirus case.
  - The patient had been placed in isolation at an undisclosed hospital, and family members of the patient were put under observation.

=== 12 March ===
- Minister Ziya Selçuk organized a press conference on 12 March and announced that disinfection would be carried out in all schools after the closure. He said that the weekly curriculum would be structured and the necessary training and education support would be provided by EBA on the Internet and TRT on television, and they had taken whatever measures that were necessary to prevent interruptions and delays in educational programs.
- On 12 March, after a meeting between President Recep Tayyip Erdoğan and the rest of the Turkish government, Press Secretary İbrahim Kalın announced that primary schools, middle schools, and high schools in Turkey will be closed starting from 16 March 2020 for a week. Universities will also be closed for three weeks. Sports matches will be played behind closed doors in stadiums until the end of April. The president also postponed all his overseas visits.

=== 13 March ===
- On 13 March, Health Minister Fahrettin Koca made an announcement via his official Twitter account, confirming that a relative of the first person infected with coronavirus had fallen ill with the disease and was taken under observation and necessary measures were taken.
- In the evening, it was announced that three other people in the same family had tested positive for coronavirus, and thus the number of confirmed cases in Turkey rose to five.
- The Grand National Assembly of Turkey announced that no visitors would be accepted to parliament between 13 and 31 March.
- On 13 March, Turkey announced its decision to stop all flights to and from Germany, France, Spain, Norway, Denmark, Belgium, Sweden, Austria and the Netherlands starting from Saturday at 08.00 am until 17 April.
- On the same day, Minister of Justice Abdulhamit Gül announced that meetings in all open and closed prisons, the use of family meeting rooms and transfers between prisons were delayed for two weeks.

=== 14 March ===
- On 14 March, following a meeting between President Recep Tayyip Erdoğan and Azerbaijani President Ilham Aliyev, the two countries temporarily stopped land and air transportation.
- On the same day, Turkey and Georgia announced their mutual decision to close the Sarp Border Gate.
- Later in the evening, Koca announced that the number of confirmed cases rose to six, with a pilgrim who recently returned from Umrah testing positive.

=== 15 March ===
- On 15 March, the Ministry of Culture and Tourism announced that between 16 and 30 March all libraries in Turkey will be closed.
- According to the statement made by the Ministry of Youth and Sports, 5,392 out of 10,300 citizens who returned from Umrah were quarantined in state dormitories in Ankara and 4,938 were quarantined in Konya.
- The Ministry of the Interior announced that pavilions, discotheques, bars and night clubs will be closed temporarily starting from 10:00 on 16 March.
- On the same day, Fahrettin Koca announced that the number of confirmed cases increased to 18, with 7 of the new cases originating from Europe and 3 cases originating from the United States.

=== 16 March ===
- On 16 March, the Turkish Directorate of Religious Affairs announced a nationwide ban on prayer gatherings in mosques, including Friday prayers, due to the pandemic.
- Later that day, the Ministry of the Interior also sent a notice on coronavirus precautions to the 81 provinces of Turkey, temporarily closing all public gathering places such as cafes, gyms, Internet cafés and movie theaters, except shops and restaurants not offering music, starting 24:00 that evening.
- Fahrettin Koca announced that Egypt, England, Ireland, Switzerland, Saudi Arabia and the United Arab Emirates were added to the list of countries for which the flight ban was imposed.
- Koca also announced that the number of confirmed cases rose to 47, with new cases originating from Middle East, Europe and the United States.
- The Directorate of Communications announced that President Erdoğan will head a comprehensive coordination meeting on Wednesday to discuss plans for combating the new type of coronavirus and inform the public about the results afterwards.

=== 17 March ===
- On 17 March, Minister Selçuk visited TRT studios where content related to the new distance education format was prepared, and stated that the new process was being reviewed to the finest detail, and that the planning and infrastructure preparations would be completed by the week of 23 March. Selçuk stated that the first lesson using this training technique would be given by him.
- Later that day, Minister Koca reported the first death from the coronavirus, an 89-year-old patient, while the number of confirmed cases rose to 98.

=== 18 March ===
- On 18 March, President Erdoğan urged the public to stay at home and not to visit hospitals outside emergency cases. Erdoğan further stated that public banks will deliver pensions to retirees above the age of 76 to their homes, with the minimum amount of payment for retired people being ₺1,500.
- A ₺100 million economic measures package was also announced by the government to address financial issues of companies and low-income households. With this package the government promised to raise the Credit Guarantee Fund (KGF) limit, postpone tax liabilities, SGK premium payments and credit debts of employers in sectors most affected by the crisis, and make a resource transfer of ₺2 billion to families in need, among other measures.
- Later that day, Minister Koca announced the second death from coronavirus, a 61-year-old male patient. Koca further stated that the number of confirmed cases rose to 191 with 93 new cases.
- The Turkish Medical Association, TTB Specialist Associations, Public Health Experts Association, Turkish Clinical Microbiology and Infectious Diseases Association, Turkish Thoracic Society, and Turkish Intensive Care Association had a meeting on 17 March to evaluate the developments regarding the COVID-19 outbreak. In their paper, released on 18 March, they concluded that the pandemic poses significant dangers for healthcare workers and patients, adding that deficiencies in information and precautions have caused confusion, and insufficient information on drug use, lack of access to tests, and various other issues have made it difficult to combat the pandemic.

=== 19 March ===
- On 19 March, it was reported that former commander in chief of the Turkish Army Aytaç Yalman died of coronavirus disease on 15 March 2020, aged 79.
- Later that day, one person had tested positive for coronavirus, and 45 co-workers and their family members were quarantined in Çeşme district of İzmir Province.
- Youth and Sports Minister Mehmet Kasapoğlu announced that football, volleyball, basketball and handball leagues were postponed.
- The Measuring, Selection and Placement Center postponed 9 exams, including TUS and MSÜ, which were planned to be held soon.
- The Directorate of Religious Affairs issued a circular to be sent to the provincial muftis, and stating that mosques would be kept closed on Friday.
- In a statement published on his Twitter account, Minister of Health Fahrettin Koca announced that an 85-year-old woman had lost her life, adding that there were 168 new confirmed cases.
- The announced economic measures package, set to be provided by the government, was criticized by institutions and individuals, including economists and politicians. The lack of a detailed action plan was the center of criticism. Additionally, at a time when people were encouraged to stay at home, the government was criticized for allowing airline passenger transport and tax reductions that support tourism. Critics asked for lowering the down payment of housing loans and emphasized on the need to provide employment support to different sectors.

=== 20 March ===
- On 20 March, Ministry of Health issued an order to declare all hospitals with at least two specialists in infections, pulmonology, internal medicine and clinical microbiology, including private and foundation hospitals, as coronavirus pandemic hospitals.
- Minister Koca reported that total number of confirmed cases and deaths rose to 670 and 9, respectively.
- Through a presidential statement, it was announced that all kinds of scientific, cultural, and artistic meetings or activities were postponed until the end of April.
- The Human Rights Association, Human Rights Foundation of Turkey, Association of Lawyers for Liberty, Contemporary Lawyers Association, and Health and Social Service Workers Union of Civil Society in the Penal System, also published a statement on the COVID-19 outbreak and urged for immediate action in prisons. In their article, they emphasized on informing the public, especially family and lawyers of prisoners, about quarantine practices and the health status of prisoners.
- Free public transportation for people 65 years of age or older was temporarily suspended in Balıkesir, Konya and Malatya.
- Horse racing games were postponed until a second announcement is made in the future.

=== 21 March ===
- On 21 March, Minister Koca has reported that the number of confirmed cases rose to 947 with a death toll of 21, following the death of 12 elderly patients.
- The Ministry of the Interior reported that, with the circular it sent to the 81 provincial governorships, military farewell ceremonies were temporarily suspended. In addition, it was announced that the activities of barber shops, hair dressers and beauty parlours were to cease by 6:00 pm.
- The Ministry of Agriculture and Forestry banned barbecuing in gardens, parks and promenades.
- The Ministry of Transport and Infrastructure announced that as of 5:00 pm flights to 46 more countries had stopped, thereby cutting air transport with 68 countries in total.
- The Ministry of Interior announced a total curfew for those who are over the age 65 or chronically ill.
- The announcement further stated that starting from midnight, restaurants, dining places and patisseries were to be closed to the public for sitting, and were only allowed to offer home delivery and take-away.
- Fenerbahçe Basketball announced that some players in its team and administrative staff had symptoms of the coronavirus disease.
- Free public transportation for people over 65 was temporarily suspended in Ankara, Antalya and İzmir.

=== 22 March ===
- With a presidential order, all bankruptcy and financial executives processes were stopped until 30 April, however obligations regarding alimony and child support payments remained in force.
- Additionally, through a new statement issued by the president, public institutions and organizations were ordered to allow for alternating and flexible schedules and enforce remote working if possible.
- The Ministry of the Interior declared that the health workers, mayors, provincial directors, social service institutions officers, public servants, public service providers and pharmacists, especially doctors, were exempted from the curfew, which is enforced for the people aged 65 and over.
- The Banks Association of Turkey also sent a notice to different banks across the country and limited their working hours to 12:00 pm to 5:00 pm, which went into effect on 23 March 2020.

=== 23 March ===
- At a press conference, Koca announced that a drug called Favipiravir, which was reported by Chinese authorities to be effective in treating the disease, was imported and started to be administered to intensive care patients. Koca also announced that healthcare workers would be paid an additional fee on their paychecks for 3 months.
- On the same day, Fatih Terim, a famous Turkish association football manager and former player, was diagnosed with the COVID-19.
- The remote classes for primary, secondary and high schools started on 23 March 2020 on TRT EBA TV, a channel created through the collaboration of TRT and the Ministry of Education.
- It was decided that the Grand Bazaar in Istanbul would remain open between 10.00 am-4.00 pm, however, entering and exiting would be controlled and done only through two doors.
- The Youth and Sports Minister Mehmet Kasapoğlu announced that the number of people coming from abroad and quarantined at home was 11,269.

=== 24 March ===
- The Ministry of the Interior issued a statement, announcing that markets could serve customers between 9:00 am to 9:00 pm, adding that the number of customers in every store needed to be limited to one tenth of its original number based on its area. In addition, it was announced that public transportation vehicles that work in and across the cities could fill up only 50% of their capacity with people at a time.
- Import tariffs on ethanol, disposable medical masks, and ventilators have been lifted with presidential decrees.

=== 25 March ===
- At the press conference held on 25 March, Minister Selçuk announced that remote teaching would continue until 30 April.
- It was announced that a football player and a healthcare professional from Fenerbahçe football team, President of Başakşehir F.K. Göksel Gümüşdağ, and journalist Ali Sirmen had tested positive for COVID-19.
- President Recep Tayyip Erdoğan delivered a speech to the nation.

=== 26 March ===
- On the same day, YÖK President Yekta Saraç stated that there would be no in-person teaching at universities in the remainder of the spring semester, and that they would continue with remote education only. He added that the programs, courses and practical courses that could not be offered with distance education and digital education would be completed in the summer months. He announced that the Higher Education Institutions Exam was postponed to 25–26 July.
- With the decision of the Ministry of Trade, the export of respiratory equipment was permitted.
- TÜBİTAK and the Ministry of Industry and Technology launched the COVID-19 Turkey Web Portal.
- The Minister of National Education Ziya Selçuk announced that the High School Entrance Exams would be made only from the material covered in the first semester curriculum.
- During the pandemic, the first call for tender for Istanbul Canal was criticized by the opposition.
- The Ministry of the Interior postponed the meetings of the metropolitan, provincial, district, municipal municipalities and local administrative unions and provincial councils in April, May and June.
- Kilyos and Beykoz were determined as burial places in Istanbul for those who lost their lives due to COVID-19.
- In his statement, the mayor of Istanbul Ekrem İmamoğlu announced that they were expecting a controlled curfew for Istanbul from the government.

=== 27 March ===
- On 27 March, the Ministry of the Interior issued a new statement regarding gatherings during weekends, announcing that starting from 28 to 29 March, having picnics, fishing at the shores, doing outside physical exercises (including running and walking in the weekends in city and town centers) would be banned until the virus spread has been contained. It was also stated that, should they deem it necessary, local authorities may extend these new measures to weekdays.
- With the advice of the Ministry of Health, Kendirli town in Rize and Yeniselimiye, Beştepe, Esentepe and Maltepe villages close to the town were quarantined to prevent the spread of coronavirus.
- In a message published by the Minister of National Education Twitter on 27 March, it announced that subjects that were set to be covered during the second semester were removed from the Higher Education Institutions Exam.
- Also on 27 March, President Erdoğan announced that all overseas flights were terminated, adding that intercity travel was subject to permission by the state governors, and that places such as picnic areas, forests and ruins would be closed on the weekend.
- Public Personnel Selection Examinations were postponed to September, October and November.
- Friday prayers were done in Beştepe National Mosque with a limited number of people determined by the Directorate of Religious Affairs.
- It was announced that public and private healthcare workers could not leave their posts for three months.

=== 28 March ===
- Turkish Airlines announced that its domestic flights were restricted from Istanbul and Ankara to some metropolitan cities.
- The Minister of Transport Mehmet Cahit Turhan was dismissed and Adil Karaismailoğlu was appointed to replace him.
- Rüştü Reçber, former captain of the national football team of Turkey, announced that he had tested positive for COVID-19.
- At the entrance and exit points of the cities, new measurements were enforced for the drivers and passengers.
- With the circular issued by the Ministry of the Interior, a "Travel Permit Certificate" requirement was introduced for domestic air transportation.

=== 29 March ===
- With the circular issued by the Ministry of the Interior, it was announced that from midnight, Istanbul, Ankara and İzmir would limit the number of commercial taxis by enforcing an even-odd system, according to the last digit on their registration plate. The decision was left to the governors for other provinces.
- With the decision taken by the governorships of Istanbul and Ankara, children were prohibited from entering bazaars and markets.

=== 30 March ===
- On the same day, the presidential cabinet gathered for the first time using the teleconference method. Speaking after the meeting, President Erdoğan announced that 41 settlements were under quarantine. He also announced the initiation of a donation campaign called "We're Enough for Each Other Turkey" (Biz Bize Yeteriz Türkiyem). While the campaign was supported by representatives of the ruling party, members of the oppositions had a less favorable reaction to it.
- It was announced that the sea buses and ferry services that make intercity trips in Istanbul would stop operating from 5:00 pm.
- The Turkish Medical Association announced the number of confirmed cases and death figures by province.

=== 31 March ===
- The Mayor of Istanbul, Ekrem İmamoğlu, mentioned Istanbul as the center of the pandemic in Turkey, and reiterated the demand for a curfew in Istanbul.
- Kırklareli Governor Osman Bilgin and a doctor in the Grand National Assembly tested positive for COVID-19.
- Through a circular issued by the Ministry of the Interior, the donation accounts set by the municipalities were blocked.
- TÜRK-İŞ leader Ergün Atalay issued a written statement on 31 March, demanding the banning of layoffs and asked for stopping all works for at least 15 days except those offering essential goods and services. Atalay stressed the necessity of the rapid introduction of the Unemployment Insurance Fund to address the issue of the loss of income, and added that all workers who suffer loss of employment and income should have their provisional income support by their employer, the Unemployment Insurance Fund and the state.
- DİSK, KESK, TMMOB and TTB launched a signature campaign on 31 March to enforce seven emergency measures. During this period, they believed that "Works should be terminated immediately during the epidemic in all sectors except those providing basic, compulsory and urgent goods and services. Dismissals should be prohibited during the epidemic, small tradesmen should be supported, employees should be given paid leave, and unemployment support should be provided for the unemployed. Consumer, housing and vehicle loans and credit card debts and electricity, water, natural gas and communication bills should be postponed during the epidemic without future interests."

== April 2020 ==
=== 1 April ===
- On 1 April, Minister Koca broke down the regional cases for the first time, adding that confirmed cases had been detected in all 81 of Turkey's provinces. Until then, regional figures were not made public to avoid people moving away from worse affected areas, spreading the virus from one region to another. In Turkey, 60% of cases were seen in Istanbul.
- The Minister of Health also announced that 601 health workers had tested positive for coronavirus and 1 doctor had died.
- As of 1 April 2020, the campaign Biz Bize Yeteriz Türkiyem had raised ₺552 million. After the government's decision to take money from the income of several institutions in order to make donations to this campaign, the Confederation of Public Employees' Unions filed a criminal complaint as a result of the salary cuts of the staff of many institutions such as MEB, BOTAŞ, General Directorate of Forestry, Ministry of Justice, Supreme Court and Social Service Provincial Directorates.
- 11 metropolitan mayors from the CHP issued a joint statement on the decision made by the government to block their donation accounts.
- With the circular issued by the Ministry of the Interior, it was announced that there should at least be a 3-meter distance between the racks in the market places, a determined number of customers could be allowed in the market, and entries and exits would be made from different places.
- Cemil Taşcıoğlu, a faculty member at the Internal Medicine Department of Istanbul University, died due to complications from COVID-19. Taşçıoğlu was the first doctor to die due to COVID-19 in Turkey.

=== 2 April ===
- After the donation campaign initiated by the metropolitan municipalities with CHP administration was terminated by the Ministry of the Interior and their bank accounts were blocked, the Ankara Bar Association issued a statement, saying: "Although the aforementioned circular and blocking process enforced by the Ministry of the Interior are clearly unlawful, the provision of social services belongs neither exclusively to the local governments nor to the central government."
- With the decision of Provincial Sanitary Boards, it was announced that those coming to Antalya, Burdur, Tunceli and Bodrum would be kept under quarantine for 14 days.
- It was decided to control the traffic in Tunceli on an even-odd base, according to the last digit of the vehicle registration plates.
- President Recep Tayyip Erdoğan met with the AK Party mayors using the video conferencing method.
- PTT announced that it has temporarily closed its branches, which are usually filled with people and where social distancing rules cannot be applied.

=== 3 April ===
- The Istanbul Chamber of Physicians suggested that the figures given by the Ministry of Health were based on cases that test positive for PCR, and do not include the number of 'suspected / possible cases' among inpatients or outpatients. The Chamber of Physicians also criticized the practices carried out in private hospitals in Istanbul.
- On the same day, President Erdoğan announced a 15-day entrance ban to 30 metropolitan municipalities as well as Zonguldak. Also, the curfew was extended to people younger than 20 years old. Using masks in public places became mandatory. However, with the additional circular issued and sent to all provinces, exceptions to this ban were determined. According to the new order, procedures involving health care assistance, funerals, military and passenger transports would be exempted from the ban, provided that certain conditions were met.
- Istanbul and Ankara Metropolitan Municipalities announced that free masks would be distributed to the public after a ban on traveling without a mask in public transport vehicles was enforced.
- The Turkish Football Federation said in a statement that the league could start at the earliest in early June, and the situation would be reassessed by the Board of Directors in the first week of May.
- Turkish Airlines stopped domestic flights until 20 April.
- The Kocaeli Governorate announced that it was forbidden to leave a job in the province for 15 days. The governor's office later issued a new statement, saying that the previous one was released by accident.

=== 4 April ===
- On 4 April 2020, Deputy Minister of Foreign Affairs Yavuz Selim Kıran announced that the death toll of Turkish expatriates who lost their lives to COVID-19 reached to 156. Kıran tweeted that 55 in France, 31 in Germany, 22 in Netherlands, 16 in UK, 14 in Belgium, 7 in US, 5 in Sweden, 3 in Switzerland, 2 in Austria and 1 in Lebanon died because of the disease.
- Tekirdağ Governorate announced that public transportation would be stopped in the province for 15 days.
- Mayor of Istanbul Ekrem İmamoğlu stated on his Twitter account that starting from Monday, 6 April, the metro services would be made until 9:00 PM. He also added that the İstiklal Street trams and the F1 Taksim–Kabataş funicular line would be stopped and emergency lighting system would be implemented at metro stations.

=== 5 April ===
- The Ministry of the Interior announced in its circular that workers between the ages of 18 and 20 would be exempted from the curfew set by the government for people under the age of 20.
- According to a report published by Google, community mobility in Turkey had decreased by 75%.

=== 6 April ===
- The Speaker of the Grand National Assembly, Mustafa Şentop, announced that the celebrations of National Sovereignty and Children's Day on 23 April were postponed and asked the public to sing the National Anthem from their balconies on 23 April at 9.00 pm local time.
- President Recep Tayyip Erdoğan said in his statement that the sale of masks in exchange for money was banned and a 1000-room field hospital would be established in the lands surrounding Istanbul Atatürk Airport and Sancaktepe.
- With the decision taken by the Ministry of Health and the Ministry of Transport and Infrastructure, it was decided to distribute free masks to citizens aged 20–65 through Ptt.

=== 7 April ===
- All MPs attending the general session of the Grand National Assembly appeared in their seats wearing masks.
- Lemon exports were subjected to permission by the government.

=== 8 April ===
- Cemeteries were temporarily closed to visitors in Ankara.
- President of the Religious Affairs, Ali Erbaş, announced that the Tarawih prayers to be performed in Ramadan will not take place in mosques during the pandemic.

=== 9 April ===
- The Ministry of the Interior announced in its circular that citizens under 20 years of age diagnosed with autism, severe intellectual disability and down syndrome were exempt from curfew.
- It was announced that free mask distribution would be made through pharmacies in Istanbul.
- Treatment of coronavirus cases officially fell under the tasks performed by the emergency sections of hospitals.
- Turkey donated 100,000 protective masks, 2,000 protective suits, and 1,500 COVID-19 testing kits to Serbia.

=== 10 April ===
- On the same day, at a special meeting among the members of the Turkic Council, President Erdoğan expressed hopes for overcoming the pandemic, "Of course we will win this war. The adoption of such a movement will make our council more visible and increase its global strength."
- In the late hours of 10 April, a 48-hour curfew was declared by the Ministry of the Interior in 30 metropolitan municipalities and Zonguldak, starting from 12:00 am on 11 April. Upon announcement of the ban 2 hours ahead of its start, people lined in front of bakeries and markets. A number of incidents and quarrels took place among the people who were waiting in line in different locations.

=== 11 April ===
- It was announced that the Istanbul Metro would not operate for two days due to the curfew.

=== 12 April ===
- On the same day, the Minister of the Interior Süleyman Soylu announced that he intended to resign after criticism of the weekend lockdown which led to panic buying and other incidents. The resignation was not accepted by President Erdoğan, and Soylu remained in office.

=== 13 April ===
- After the cabinet meeting on Monday, 13 April, Recep Tayyip Erdoğan announced that a curfew will be imposed from Friday, 17 April to Sunday night, 19 April.

=== 14 April ===
- On 14 April, Independent Turkey Party chairman Haydar Baş died at age 73, from COVID-19.
- The Minister of National Defense, Hulusi Akar, announced that the recruitment of 53 thousand people who would join the army in April was postponed, and the service period of those who joined the military in November 2019 was extended by one month.
- The presidential decision to provide care for all citizens who have caught COVID-19 for free is published in the T.C. Resmi Gazete.

=== 15 April ===
- The Grand National Assembly passes a new set to protect healthcare workers from violence A separate bill was also passed, setting the framework for teachers during and after the pandemic.
- The Minister of Agriculture and Forestry, Bekir Pakdemirli, announced that those engaged in agriculture and animal husbandry will be exempted from the curfew.
- Ali Ülkü Azrak, one of the former deans of the Faculty of Political Sciences of Istanbul University, died of COVID-19.
- The Ministry of the Interior announced that quarantine was implemented in a total of 227 neighborhoods in 58 provinces.

=== 16 April ===
- The bill, which includes new measures for alleviate the effects of the coronavirus pandemic on social and economic life, was ratified by the Grand National Assembly.
- In the circular sent to the 81 provincial governorships by the Ministry of the Interior, it was stated that a curfew would be applied in 31 provinces for the upcoming weekend. Bakeries, pharmacies, public and private health institutions and public institutions and organizations and businesses necessary for the maintenance of compulsory public services will be open during the curfew.
- The writer and translator Nevzat Erkmen, who made the first Turkish translation of Ulysses, died due to COVID-19.

=== 29 April ===
- On 29 April, Ziya Selçuk announced that the interval previously announced for remote education was extended until 31 May.

== May 2020 ==
=== 4 May ===
- On the same day, President Erdoğan made a press statement after the cabinet meeting. Explaining that the return to normal life will happen gradually, Erdoğan stated that they made the regulations regarding the gradual stretching of the restrictions to be imposed through several steps in May, June and July.

=== 5 May ===
- On the same day, the Industry and Technology Minister Mustafa Varank stated that on 11 May, all the main automotive factories in the country will start to operate again.

=== 6 May ===
- On 6 May 2020, Fahrettin Koca spoke about the normalization process in Turkey. Describing the new phase with loosened restrictions as "controlled social life", Koca stated that the outbreak in Turkey was now under control but the risk continues and that citizens should not give up measures.

=== 7 May ===
- On 7 May 2020, the price ceiling for surgical masks was estimated as ₺1.
- Through a handbook published on the same day, it was announced that barbers, hairdressers and beauty saloons will not be able to accept customers without masks and preexisting appointments, and that nobody other than customers and employees can be present at the workplace.

=== 18 May ===
- On 18 May, President Erdoğan announced that the schools which were expected to open on 1 June will remain closed and the 2019–2020 Academic Year has officially ended. He added that the new academic year will begin in September 2020.

== June 2020 ==
=== 1 June ===
- On 1 June, domestic flights were resumed and most public spaces were opened, including restaurants, swimming pools, beaches, parks, libraries and museums.

=== 2 June ===
- On 2 June, the Turkish Parliament resumed full activities for the first time in 48 days since a hiatus was declared due to the pandemic. The Parliament started working under "new norms" including enhanced hygiene measures, use of masks and social distancing.

=== 4 June ===
- In June, the Emergency Medical Experts Association launched a story contest titled "COVID-19 Stories". They said that in this contest they would evaluate the stories related to the effects of the pandemic on citizens' lives and later award the best three inputs.

=== 13 June ===
- On 13 June 2020, the National Defense University Military Student Candidate Determination Exam (2020-MSÜ) was held.

=== 20 June ===
- On 20 June 2020, the exams organized by the Transition System for High Schools were held across Turkey. A partial curfew was imposed during the exam.

=== 27 June ===
- A partial curfew was imposed during the Higher Education Institutions Exams that were held on 27–28 June.

== August 2020 ==
=== 26 August ===
- With the circular issued by the president's office, rotational, flexible and remote work in public institutions and organizations was allowed. The rotational, flexible and remote working practice, which was initiated by the circular previously published on 22 March 2020, had expired on 1 June 2020.

== September 2020 ==
=== 30 September 2020 ===
- The Minister of Health, Fahrettin Koca, released a statement after meeting with the Coronavirus Scientific Advisory Board and said, "Not every case is sick. Because there are those who test positive but show no symptoms, and they are the vast majority." Explaining the distinction between definitions of patient and case, Koca said, "The number of new patients that are announced and focused on every day should be an issue of attention."

== October 2020 ==
=== 2 October 2020 ===
- The Ministry of Health released its September weekly reports with delay, approximately a month after the weekly report covering 24–30 August. The ministry, which explained the number of cases in previous reports, started to give data on the number of patients instead of cases in new reports.

=== 9 October 2020 ===
- Fahrettin Koca announced the latest developments in making an indigenous vaccine and added that trials on humans would probably begin in 2 weeks.

== November 2020 ==
=== 17 November ===
- Recep Tayyip Erdoğan announced new measures to control the spread of the virus. He stated that distant learning would continue until the end of the year, a curfew would be imposed on weekends except between 10:00 am–08:00 pm, restaurants would only provide take-away service, and shopping malls and markets would close at 08:00 pm.

=== 20 November ===
- On 20 November, Ministry of Health reinstated the curfew on people age 65 and older and people twenty and younger. On the same day, Minister of Internal Affairs ordered businesses and places of worship to halt indoor activities. Grocery stores and pharmacies have remained open, with legally imposed limits to capacity.

=== 30 November ===
- On 30 November, official figures showed that gross domestic product expanded 15.6 per cent compared with the previous quarter, and 6.7 per cent compared with a year earlier.

== December 2020 ==
=== 6 December ===
- On 6 December, Ministry of Health Fahrettin Koca announced that 50 million doses of CoronaVac should arrive by the end of February 2021, and 10 million doses of the Pfizer–BioNTech COVID-19 vaccine should start arriving still during December.

=== 7 December ===
- On 7 December, Pfizer and BioNTech finalized their submission to the Turkish Medicines and Medical Devices Agency (TMA), which has been reviewing data from the clinical trial on a rolling basis since October. The TMA said it would recommend granting an emergency use authorization if it concluded "that the benefits of the vaccine outweigh its risks in protecting against COVID-19", based on the 2004 law that created the TMA's process.

=== 10 December ===
- On 10 December, the seven-day averages for three of the primary metrics (tests, cases, hospitalizations) were at record highs. Earlier in the spring of 2020, during the first COVID-19 surge in the Turkey, the rising death toll reached a peak on 22 April, with a seven-day average of 122 daily deaths. In December, the seven-day average of deaths in Turkey from COVID-19 broke that record, at 255 on 29 December.

=== 13 December ===
- On 13 December, TMA pushed back formal assessments of two COVID-19 vaccines, delaying distribution of the Pfizer–BioNTech COVID-19 vaccine and CoronaVac in Turkey to the end of December. The TMA said it planned to give an opinion on the Pfizer–BioNTech COVID-19 vaccine at a meeting on 29 December. TMA has also delayed assessing the rival Moderna vaccine until 12 January.

== January 2021 ==
=== 1 January ===
- Turkey detected 15 cases of the UK coronavirus variant on 1 January 2021.

=== 14 January ===
- On 14 January 2021, Turkish President Recep Tayyip Erdoğan received the COVID-19 vaccine.

== See also ==
- COVID-19 pandemic in Turkey
- Timeline of the COVID-19 pandemic
