= Coronavirus Scientific Advisory Board =

Group of medical scientists set up by the Ministry of Health

The Coronavirus Scientific Advisory Board (Turkish: Koronavirüs Bilim Kurulu) is a group of medical scientists set up by the Ministry of Health to develop measures in the fight against the COVID-19 pandemic in Turkey that are imposed by the government.

The Scientific Advisory Board was set up on 10 January 2020 following the emergence of the coronavirus outbreak, before the World Health Organization confirmed it mid March as pandemic. The board initially consisted of 26 members, including 21 university professors and 4 medical experts specialized in Pulmonology, Infectious Diseases, Clinical Microbiology and a legal adviser. The number of board members later increased to 31 with the joining of expert academics in virology, internal medicine, intensive care medicine. The Minister of Heath Fahrettin Koca mentioned in a press conference on 7 April that the advisory board has 35 members. This number later increased to 38.

The board members do their own work in the morning and meet every day in the afternoon at the Ministry of Health. The board works out guidelines for the treatment by medicals and measures to be followed by the public, and updates them in context of the disease's course in the country. The board reports to the Health Minister. The implementation of the measures is carried out by the government. Almost every board member is invited by television, radio and newspapers to inform and warn the public about the coronavirus and personal protection as well as to prevent information pollution in the social media.

== Activities ==
Until now the Scientific Board has published a set of general recommendations, including moving Turkish citizens in China back to Turkey, prohibiting international flights, closing the land borders to certain countries, establishing hospitals exclusively for the pandemic, postponing the trips by Turkish citizens to other countries, enforcing a 14-day quarantine for people coming back from other countries, promoting remote education, temporarily changing the working system for restaurants, dormitories and nursing homes, and postponing meetings between family members and prisoners in all prisons.

After the first death on 9 January 2020 in Wuhan, the "2019-nCoV Disease Guide" prepared by the Scientific Board was published by the Ministry of Health on 14 January. In the guide, general information on the care and isolation process for patients are written in detail for healthcare workers, and the symptoms helpful for the identification and confirming a case and the procedures to be followed after the identification are also included. Following the emergence of new information and further developments, the information on the guide was updated on 28 January after a meeting between board members. On 2 February, an oral presentation on the guide was released on the website as a result of the decision taken after another meeting.

To spread information on COVID-19, the Ministry of Health prepared booklets that were distributed to the Provincial Health Directorates, all health units and public institutions. The booklet included information on the definition of the virus, symptoms of the disease and methods of transmission. On 26 March 2020, members of the Scientific Board met with Chinese officials and scientists using the video conferencing method. During the three-hour meeting, discussions about sharing knowledge and experience took place. Hürriyet newspaper columnist Abdulkadir Selvi said that during the meeting, Chinese scientists made four recommendations. He claimed that isolation is the main means of fighting the disease and quarantining confirmed cases, those coming back from other countries and infected healthcare workers would be helpful.

Writing for the Habertürk website, Muharrem Sarıkaya claimed that the Scientific Board had worked on a three-stage plan following their meeting on 27 March 2020 to control the pandemic in Turkey. He added that all of the plans included enforcing quarantines and curfews in certain parts of the country, and out of the three plans only Plan A was being used at the time. He wrote that the quarantine of some villages and towns was the result of this plan. He claimed that the partial curfew would be implemented under Plan B, and the absolute curfew would be applied under Plan C. While explaining that the provisions of "National Preparation Plan for Influenza Pandemic" prepared in 2009 were implemented, he said that they were not considering a switch to Plan C under the current conditions.

After the Science Board's meeting on 28 March 2020, the Minister of Health Fahrettin Koca said that the decisions taken were forwarded to the Office of the President and he would make a statement after evaluation by the President. After evaluating and taking into consideration the Science Board's recommendations, the President of Turkey Recep Tayyip Erdoğan announced new measures to battle the ongoing pandemic across the country. He announced that the international flights were completely terminated, the intercity trips could only be done with the permission of the governorships, pandemic boards would be formed by the governorships, and that these decisions would be implemented meticulously in 30 metropolitan areas. Based on the directions by the Ministry of the Interior, the "Circular on Flight / Bus Schedule within the Scope of Coronavirus Measures to 81 Provincial Governorships" was published. According to the circular, it was announced that instructions were sent to the governorships in order to increase the effectiveness of the decisions taken in line with the recommendations of the Ministry of Health and the Scientific Board. It was also mentioned that the citizens should apply to the new platform "Travel Permit Board" to be created by the governorships for the domestic and intercity bus services, and those who are deemed eligible can travel by obtaining a "Travel Permit Certificate". Based on this circular, additional decisions were later made and a "2-Day Curfew" was announced on 10 April 2020 by the Ministry of the Interior, adding that curfews would be imposed on two consecutive days in 30 metropolitan municipalities as well as Zonguldak. After the details of the new arrangements were revealed, people went to the markets and grocery stores in an hour or two before the ban was imposed, violating the social distancing rules, and this caused controversy among the public. According to a claim made by Yeniçağ columnist Fatih Ergin, the announcement of the decision late at night even disturbed some members of the Scientific Board. It was said that the violation of the social distancing rules brought some members of the Scientific Board to the brink of resignation, but as a result of Fahrettin Koca's intervention, they changed their mind. It was also alleged that Koca was disturbed because of the panic buying at markets and grocery stores, believing that it had disrupted their efforts against the pandemic. Tevfik Özlü, a member of the Scientific Board, said in a program he on 24 TV, "unfortunately, there is a possibility of a terrible contamination now, because our people went out without caution last night." At the same time, he mentioned that this was a breaking point and added, "... I think there will be a price paid in the next 10 days because of the people who are on the streets today and spread the disease." Another board member, Serap Şimşek Yavuz, addressed the issue on Twitter and said, "What is this confluence when we all have food for 10 days at home? Please come to yourself! It is done to prevent the virus from spreading, but the social distancing has disappeared based on the videos I watched ..." Candas Tolga Işık, a columnist for Posta newspaper, quoted Ateş Kara, a member of the Scientific Board, and wrote, "The risk has grown very, very much. As of last night, those who went out to the street must quarantine themselves for 14 days."

On 13 March, the Scientific Board convened with the participation of the Minister of Justice Abdulhamit Gül, Minister of Health Fahrettin Koca and Minister of Transport and Infrastructure Mehmet Cahit Turan. Abdulhamit Gül said that all the recommendations given by the Scientific Board and the Ministry of Health would carried out by the Ministry of Justice, and during their meeting they talked about measures necessary for the units and services related to the Ministry of Justice. The Ministry of Justice announced an emergency action plan based on the Scientific Board's recommendations. The plan contains measures such as closing prisons to visitors until the end of April, looking for convicts who had spent time abroad before their first detention period during the pandemic, and keeping detainees and convicts who come to the institution for the first time in a separate area for 14 days. On 28 March, the period for executing these measures was extended for two weeks. With the proposal of the Scientific Board on 10 April, it was agreed that the measures will be carried out at least until 30 April 2020. In another statement made by the Ministry of Justice, it was announced that all meetings between convicts and lawyers and the transfer process for detainees from one prison to another would be postponed to a later date.

The "COVID-19 (SARS-CoV-2 Infection) Guide", prepared by the Scientific Board members to assist healthcare professionals in diagnosis, precaution, and possible procedures, was updated on 14 April. New modifications were made to several sections on the guide, including "sampling, contact follow-up, ambulance patient transport, home patient monitoring, adult patient management in the designated COVID-19 outpatient clinic, adult patient treatment, supportive treatment, pediatric patient management and treatment, evaluation of health workers who have had contact with the infected people, morgue and burial arrangements." Bülent Ertuğrul, Member of the Board of the Turkish Clinical Microbiology and Infectious Diseases Association, said that "according to the treatment guide, we will start treating the disease in a very early stage."

== Members ==
The members of the board are people who have experience with Ebola, Crimean–Congo hemorrhagic fever and flu cases. Among them are people with various scientific studies and people who examine the studies on different diseases by international scientists. Their studies contribute to precise case definition, developing guides and treatment algorithms. The board initially had 26 members.

Some members of the board, including Levent Akın, Firdevs Aktaş and Ayşegül Füsun Eyüboğlu, had contributed to the preparation of the "Influenza Pandemic - National Preparation Plan" in 2009, which was again updated in 2019 and released for giving information to the general public, institutions and organizations across the country. Ateş Kara, one of the members of the Board, has been an adviser to the World Health Organization at various times. He was also among the 25 people who worked as a group to assist WHO in preventing the spread of Ebola. He prepared the "Ebola virus disease information and case management guide" with Şebnem Erdinç. Cemil Güneş, Legal Counsel of the Ministry of Health, was included in the Board to inspect the decisions taken and to investigate that there were no violations of laws. Levent Akın actively served during the emergence of Swine flu cases and was a member of the Pandemic Board. Recep Öztürk was a member of the Crimean Congo Hemorrhagic Fever Scientific Advisory Board.

In March 2020, the number of members increased to 31. After the suggestion that one of the members of the Turkish Dental Association should be on the Scientific Board, Figen Çizmeci Şenel was appointed as a member to represent the dentists by the Ministry of Health. Ahmet Demircan, a member of the Gazi University Faculty of Medicine and chief physician of the Gazi Hospital, was also asked to join the board. The Minister of Health Fahrettin Koca and the Scientific Board members came together for the first time on 3 April using the video conferencing method. In a statement made after the meeting at the Bilkent Campus of the Ministry of Health, it was said that one of the members of the Scientific Board had shown symptoms of COVID-19.

On 5 April 2020, more people joined the board and the number of members increased from 31 to 38. According to the statement of the Ministry of Health with the participation of new experts, the mission of the board was further expanded and added that they were "preparing a different team within the board who will work on the psychological, sociological, statistical and religious sociology aspects [of the pandemic]." In a statement made by Fahrettin Koca himself after the Coronavirus Scientific Board meeting on 7 April, it was said that a new board was formed and its name was the Social Sciences Board. About the tasks of this new board, he said, "...they will make studies about the process, offer social suggestions, and make proposals that will make life easier for us, and say what should be avoided by us as a society, family and individual."

Member	University/Bureau	Department/Position
Afşin Emre Kayıpmaz	Başkent University Faculty of Medicine	Emergency Medicine
Ateş Kara	Hacettepe University Faculty of Medicine	Pediatric Infectious Diseases
Ahmet Demircan	Gazi University Faculty of Medicine	Emergency Medicine
Levent Akın	Hacettepe University Faculty of Medicine	Epidemiology
Tevfik Özlü	Karadeniz Technical University Faculty of Medicine	Chest Diseases
Ayşegül Füsun Eyüboğlu	Başkent University Faculty of Medicine	Chest Diseases
Recep Öztürk	Istanbul Medipol University Faculty of Medicine	Infectious Diseases and Clinical Microbiology
Firdevs Aktaş	Gazi University Faculty of Medicine	Infectious Diseases and Clinical Microbiology
Serhat Ünal	Hacettepe University Faculty of Medicine	Infectious Diseases and Clinical Microbiology
Alpay Azap	Ankara University Faculty of Medicine	Infectious Diseases and Clinical Microbiology
Yeşim Taşova	Çukurova University Faculty of Medicine	Infectious Diseases and Clinical Microbiology
Hasan Tezer	Gazi University Faculty of Medicine	Pediatric Infectious Diseases
Şebnem Erdinç	University of Health Sciences, Ankara Training Research Hospital	Infectious Diseases and Clinical Microbiology
Aydın Yılmaz	University of Health Sciences, Ankara Atatürk Chest Diseases and Thoracic Surgery Training and Research Hospital	Chest Diseases
Rahmet Güner	Ankara Yıldırım Beyazıt University Faculty of Medicine Ankara City Hospital	Infectious Diseases and Clinical Microbiology
Canan Ağalar	University of Health Sciences, Fatih Sultan Mehmet Training and Research Hospital	Infectious Diseases and Clinical Microbiology
Müşerref Şule Akçay	Başkent University Faculty of Medicine	Chest Diseases
Akın Kaya	Ankara University School of Medicine	Pediatric Infectious Diseases
İlhami Çelik	Kayseri City Education and Research Hospital	Infectious Diseases and Clinical Microbiology
Levent Ya	University of Health Sciences, Gülhane Training and Research Hospital	Intensive Care and Internal Diseases
Zeliha Tufan Koçak	Council of Higher Education Executive Board Member	Infectious Diseases and Clinical Microbiology
Serap Şimşek Yavuz	Istanbul Medical Faculty	Infectious Diseases and Clinical Microbiology
Mehmet Doğanay	Erciyes University Faculty of Medicine	Infectious Diseases and Clinical Microbiology
Figen Çizmeci Şenel	Turkey Health Care Quality and Accreditation Institute	President
Gülay Korukluoğlu	National Virology Laboratory	Responsible
Ayla Aydın	Ministry of Health Infectious Diseases Department	President
Ali Göktepe Ayla Aydın	Ministry of Health Early Warning and Response to Threats Department	President
Selçuk Kılıç	Biological Products Department	President
Cemil Güneş		Legal Adviser
Pınar Okyay	Menderes University Faculty of Medicine	Public Health
Selma Metintaş	Osmangazi University Faculty of Medicine	Public Health
Deniz Çalışkan	Ankara University School of Medicine	Public Health
Seçil Özkan	Gazi University Faculty of Medicine	Public Health
Ali Özer	İnönü University Faculty of Medicine	Public Health
Mustafa Öztürk	University of Health Sciences, Hamidiye Institute of Health Sciences	Public Health
Ahmet Tevfik Sünter	Ondokuz Mayıs University Faculty of Medicine	Internal Medicine

== Reception ==
The scope and variety of the board was discussed by many professional groups and chambers. Uğur Emek, the head of the Department of Economics of Başkent University, stated that the Scientific Board was formed upon the discourse of "establishing a scientific advisory board and this board should be helpful in public communication" within the framework of the "Influenza Pandemic - National Preparation Plan", thus it was a mistake to create the board only from medical scientists and that the pandemic had multidimensional sectoral effects. In his interview with the BirGün newspaper, he said that it is necessary to act not only on providing help for healthcare services, but also develop "a macro-scale plan that covers economy, security, agriculture, and diplomacy." Saying that the board plays a crucial role in combating the epidemic, Mental Health Association President Ömer Akgül said, "The Coronavirus Scientific Board should be strengthened with psychological and sociological factors, or a detached Psychosocial Coronavirus Board should be established." He stated that the Scientific Board should be reshaped in order to give importance to the psychological struggle as well as the biological effectiveness of the pandemic.

Atilla Ataç, President of the Turkey Dental Association, thank the Ministry of Health and the Scientific Board, but criticized them for the lack of dentists in the board. He considered the absence of someone representing the union as a deficiency. In the following days, after the decision of the Scientific Board members that the dentist should be part of the board, a member of the Turkey Dental Association joined the board as a member. The Association of Turkish Pharmacists, while demanding the implementation of compulsory curfew across the country, explained that it is necessary to provide pharmacists with diagnostic test kits and they should have a member within the Scientific Board. Turkey Child and Adolescent Psychiatry Association Board Member Ayşen Coşkun, emphasized that keeping youth and children at home is not easy and this process is difficult. She said that mental health counselors should also be on the Scientific Board. On 5 April 2020, president of the Turkey Religious and Foundation Services Branch Public Officials Union, Nuri Ünal, mentioned that a representative from the Directorate of Religious Affairs should join the board as a member. In his statement, he said, "... we think and demand that one person from the Directorate of Religious Affairs should join the scientific boards in order to provide the correct information about religion." He also explained that they had written and sent their requests to the Minister of Health Fahrettin Koca. Following such criticisms, on 7 April 2020, an advisory structure called "Social Sciences Board" was created, where "a different team will work on the psychological, sociological, statistical and religious sociology aspects [of the pandemic]."

The board's competence and its function regarding the "curfew" also became a subject of discussion. Speaking to journalist Cüneyt Özdemir on his YouTube channel, İYİ Party leader Meral Akşener claimed that members of the Scientific Board "demanded full quarantine, but President Recep Tayyip Erdoğan refused." In her statement she emphasized that she was not speaking as a political authority but as an academic, and added, "I have a call for scientists here. They are obliged to share what they put forward with the nation and the citizens. If what they say is not done, they have to resign ..." Ahmet Saltık, a faculty member of Ankara University School of Medicine - Public Health Department, said in a program on FOX TV that there was a public health expert at the Scientific Board initially and then 6-7 experts joined. He mentioned "Managing the outbreak is the work of Public Health Experts all over the world. But the main problem is that the decisions taken by the Scientific Board are not implemented ..." and claimed that "the existence of the scientific board was meaningless in this case." Deputy leader of İYİ Party, Lütfü Türkkan, said "The Scientific Board is presenting reports to the government that it wants more radical decisions, especially a curfew," but "the government did not accept it."

The chairman of the Nationalist Movement Party, Devlet Bahçeli, criticized the board's way of sharing information with the public, and said, "... each of these scientists goes to different television channels and repeats the same things ... By choosing a spokesperson from the Scientific Board, contradictory statements can be prevented ..." He stated that appointing a spokesperson for the Scientific Board would prevent confusion. He mentioned the necessity of this in order to inform the public clearly. Gaye Usluer, a Republican People's Party Party Assembly Member and Infectious Diseases and Clinical Microbiology Specialist, criticized the discussion programs on television channels while evaluating the role and decisions of the Coronavirus Scientific Board regarding the pandemic and added, "The members of the Scientific Board should make correct statements without frightening the citizen ... by the Minister of Health or someone authorized." He also stated that "decisions regarding the coronavirus pandemic should be taken by the Scientific Board" and the role of the government is "to support the decisions of the Scientific Board and the Ministry of Health".

Sözcü newspaper columnist Yılmaz Özdil compared the Scientific Board to the Wise People Delegation and claimed that the board was set up to create sensation, "In the past 17 years, why would the government mentality which has made them not consult anyone about healthcare would change in a way to gather and form the Scientific Board?" He claimed that the board was not lean and objective asked them to "... tell the nation what happened to the nation with all its nakedness." Karar newspaper columnist Ahmet Taşgetiren said there is a good relationship between the political will and the board and commented that "the feeling of being in good hands gives confidence to the society. Therefore, the restrictions regarding the life of the society provide general support." He also pointed out the "polyphonic" and "independent of political will" stance of the board as factors affecting the trust in the society. He also referred to the Wise People Delegation, which was established during the Kurdish–Turkish peace process, and claimed that the political will facilitated the act of "communicating between the state and society" similarly through these two boards.

President of the Union of Chambers and Commodity Exchanges of Turkey Rifat Hisarcıklıoğlu said that social media contents, rumors that cause citizens to lose confidence in the Scientific Board caused serious destruction in the fight against coronavirus and added, "The Scientific Board is guiding us in this struggle. That's the truth."

== See also ==
- COVID-19 pandemic in Turkey
- Timeline of the COVID-19 pandemic in Turkey
