= Taksim German Hospital =

Taksim German Hospital Taksim Alman Hastanesi
- Location within Istanbul

Geography
- Location: Sıraselviler Cad. Beyoğlu, Istanbul, Turkey
- Coordinates: 41.03348°N 28.98418°E

Organisation
- Type: District General

Services
- Beds: 300

History
- Founded: 1852

Links
- Lists: Hospitals in Turkey

The Taksim German Hospital (Turkish: Taksim Alman Hastanesi) is a health care institution in Cihangir, Istanbul which is owned by the Universal Hospitals Group since 1992. It was closed for a three-year refurbishment and re-opened in 1995. The hospital had around 300 beds. It shut down most of its clinics during 2013 and closed its doors indefinitely following a temporary, one-month closure in 2014.

The hospital was founded in 1852 by three nurses working to the model of German Pastor Theodor Fliedner.
