= Universal Hospitals Group =

One of Turkey's largest hospital groups

- Industry: Healthcare
- Founded: 1972
- Headquarters: Turkey
- Key people: Azmi Ofluoğlu (chairman)
- Website: universalinternational.org

Universal Hospitals Group (Turkish: Universal Hastaneler Grubu) is one of Turkey's largest hospital groups. In 2013, it has 11 hospitals in 7 cities in Turkey, and is planning expansion outside Turkey to reach 25 hospitals and 4000 beds by the end of 2013, using investment from ADM Capital, and the International Finance Corporation. The Group owns the Taksim German Hospital since 1992.
