= COVID-19 pandemic in Turkey =

Aspect of viral disease pandemic

- Disease: COVID-19
- Pathogen: SARS-CoV-2
- Location: Turkey
- First outbreak: Wuhan, Hubei, China
- Index case: Undisclosed (Note: Data Protection Law number 6698 precludes the Turkish Ministry of Health from disclosing sensitive patient health information, interpreted broadly to include location during the pandemic.)
- Arrival date: 11 March 2020 (6 years, 7 months and 16 days)
- Confirmed cases: 17,004,726
- Recovered: 17,129,892
- Deaths: 101,419
- Fatality rate: 0.6%

Government website
- Ministry of Health covid19.tubitak.gov.tr corona.cbddo.gov.tr

The COVID-19 pandemic in Turkey is part of the ongoing pandemic of coronavirus disease 2019 (COVID-19) caused by severe acute respiratory syndrome coronavirus 2 (SARS-CoV-2).

The first case in Turkey was recorded on 11 March, when a local returned home from a trip to Europe. The first death due to COVID-19 in the country occurred on 15 March. Turkey stood out from the rest of Europe by not ordering a legal lockdown (Note: Turkey's Article 11/C of the Law on Public Health authorizes only provinces to order quarantines, for a maximum period of 15 days. The national government is barred by the constitution from ordering lockdowns.) until April 2021, when the country enacted its first nationwide restrictions. The government kept many businesses open, and allowed companies to set their own guidelines for workers.

The Turkish health system has the highest number of intensive care units in the world at 46.5 beds per 100,000 people (compared to 9.6 in Greece, 11.6 in France, and 12.6 in Italy). As of 3 May 2021, Turkey's observed case-fatality rate stood at 0.84%, the 148th highest rate globally. This low case-fatality rate has generated various explanations, including the relative rarity of nursing homes, favorable demographics, a long legacy of contact tracing, the high number of intensive care units, universal health care, and a lockdown regime that led to a higher proportion of positive cases among working-age adults. But according to an August 2020 academic study by The International Journal of Health Planning and Management, the government of Turkey has been underreporting COVID-19 statistics.

On 30 September 2020, Turkish Minister of Health Fahrettin Koca acknowledged that since 29 July, the reported number of cases was limited to symptomatic cases that required monitoring, which was met with rebuke by the Turkish Medical Association. This practice ended on 25 November, when the ministry started to report asymptomatic and mildly symptomatic cases alongside symptomatic ones.

== Background ==
On 12 January 2020, the World Health Organization (WHO) confirmed that a novel coronavirus was the cause of a respiratory illness in a cluster of people in Wuhan, Hubei, China, which was reported to the WHO on 31 December 2019.

The case fatality ratio for COVID-19 has been much lower than SARS of 2003, but the transmission has been significantly greater, with a significant total death toll.

== Timeline ==
=== January 2020 ===
On 10 January 2020, ignoring China's insistence on the lack of evidence for human-to-human transmission, Ministry of Health experts stated that they suspected that SARS-CoV-2 was transmitted among people, and accordingly set up the Coronavirus Scientific Advisory Board. 26 experts in infectious diseases and clinical microbiology originally comprised the Coronavirus Advisory Board, which was subsequently enlarged to include five additional experts in intensive care medicine, internal medicine, and virology. The board put forward voluntary recommendations while the government issued legal restrictions for businesses and public gatherings.

On 24 January, Turkey's health ministry installed medical stations nationwide to measure the body temperature of passersby and set up free hand sanitizer stations across public transportation hubs.

=== February 2020 ===
On 1 February, Turkey announced its decision to stop all flights from China. After Iranian authorities downplayed the spread of SARS‑CoV‑2, Turkey castigated Iran for its duplicity and laxity and unilaterally closed its border on 23 February. On the same day, Turkey announced its decision to stop all flights to and from Iran.

On 29 February, Turkey announced the termination of all flights to and from Italy, South Korea and Iraq.

=== March 2020: First confirmed case, closures, and cancellations ===
Travel restrictions imposed by Turkey Turkey Entry refused to people from these countries

Turkish cities carried out massive disinfection work in public places and mass transit vehicles. In Istanbul, hand sanitizers were installed at metrobus stations.

On 11 March 2020, the day the first known coronavirus case in Turkey was announced, the Ministry of Health created a website to track COVID-19 cases, monitor hot spots, enable people to report places selling fake PPE, and report hospital wait times.

The next day, the Ministry of National Education announced that except for schools catering to students with special needs, all schools in Turkey would close on 16 March. Given the intense learning needs of students with disabilities, the Ministry of National Education announced that elementary-, middle-, and high-school students with special needs would continue to attend school in person in fixed small groups, with adults rotating into the class, so as to facilitate contact tracing. The ministry subsequently announced that teachers and staff in schools for students with disabilities could opt out of in-person teaching if they or their families had a health risk.

Minister Koca updated the number of infected people as four on 13 March, including a pilgrim who had returned from Saudi Arabia. Following the updated tally, Turkey extended the flight ban to include many European countries, including Austria, France, and Germany.

On 16 March, Minister of the Interior Soylu ordered businesses and places of worship to halt indoor activities. With that announcement, more than 80 million people in Turkey started to live under some form of restriction to their movements when trains and public transit came to a halt nationwide.

On 20 March, Ministry of Health issued a decree that designated as "pandemic hospitals" all hospitals that employed at least two specialist doctors in infectious diseases and clinical microbiology, pulmonology, and internal diseases, and had level-3 adult ICU beds. (Note: The Ministry of Health order also requires pandemic hospitals to reserve a special ward and ICUs for COVID-19 cases and make necessary arrangements to maximize the number of ICUs allocated to this task.) At the same time, Turkey started to open drive-through screening clinics, based on the South Korean-pioneered model, which allows testing at no cost, while avoiding nosocomial transmission of SARS-CoV-2.

On 21 March, Soylu announced a total curfew, effective midnight on 22 March, for those over age 65 or whose immune system was compromised by "chronic pulmonary diseases, asthma, COPD, cardiovascular disease, kidney disease, hypertension, and liver disease."

On 23 March, Koca announced that the Ministry of Health authorized the Japanese anti-flu drug Favipiravir for emergency use, after early data disclosed by China's Science and Technology Minister Wang Zhigang showed that the drug shortened COVID-19 patients' recovery time.

On 31 March, after consulting with trade unions spearheaded by TÜRK-İŞ and DİSK, the government launched a paycheck protection program that helped small businesses keep employees on their books. Trade unions criticized this plan for not directly subsidizing employment, which would have required businesses to keep workers employed. On the same day, the government unveiled further emergency measures, including a moratorium on evictions, a stay on all debt, seizure (except for alimony and child support), and bankruptcy proceedings until 31 December.

=== April 2020: Restrictions continue ===
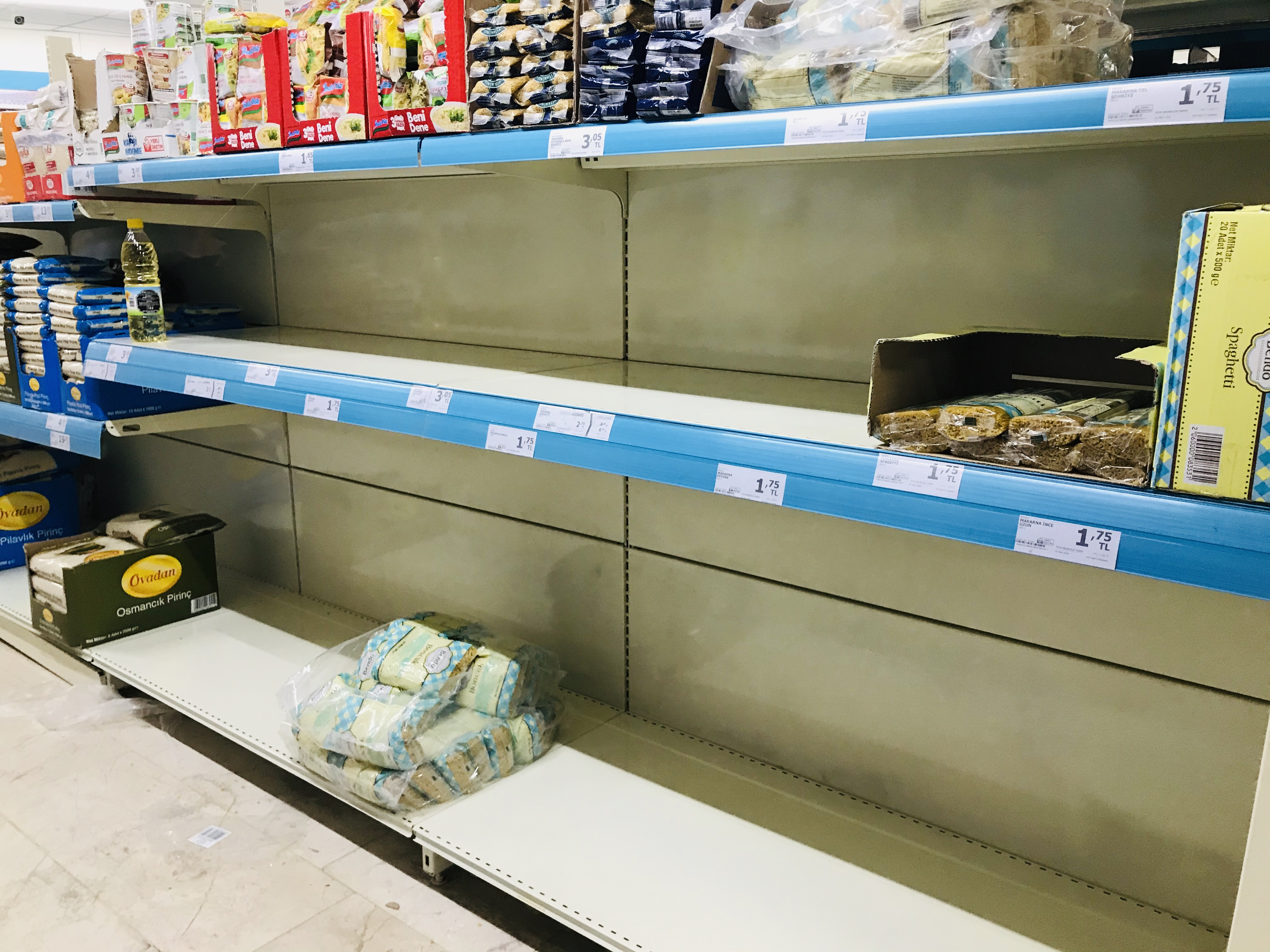
Pasta shelves at a supermarket in Istanbul after panic buying

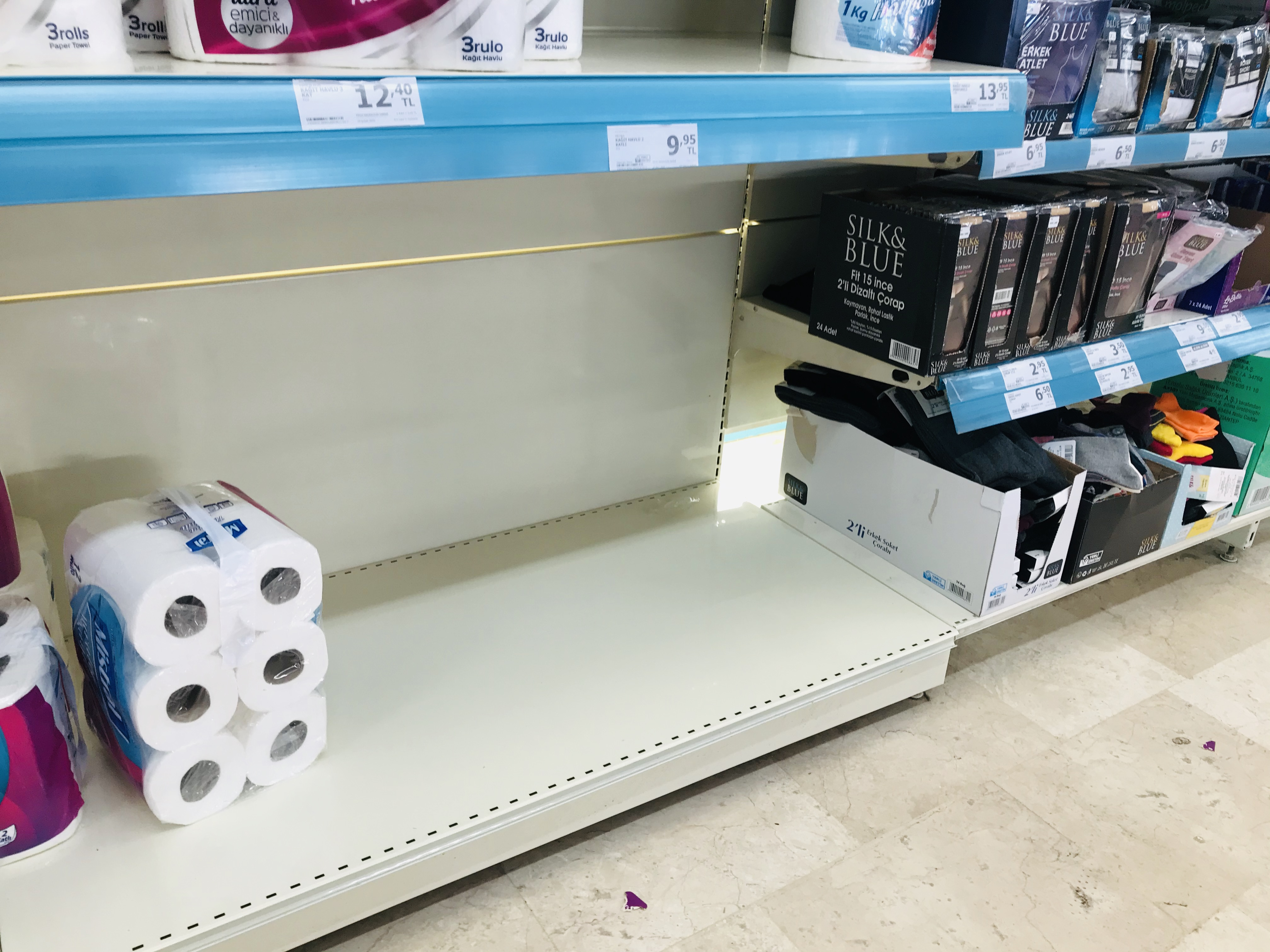
Toilet paper shelves in the same store

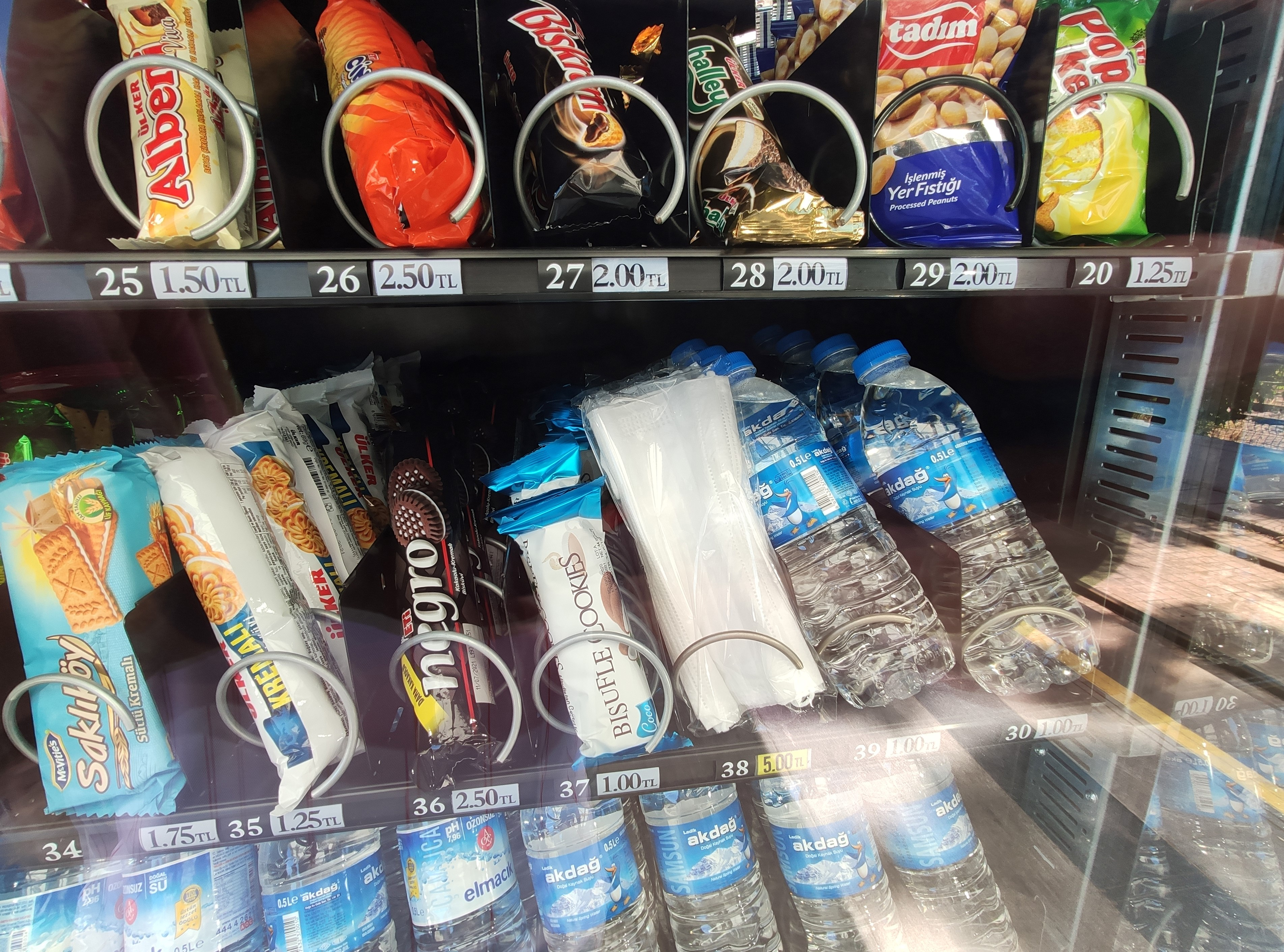
Face masks sold in a vending machine in Samsun, for 5 Turkish lira each

On 2 April, the Istanbul Medical Chamber expressed concern about the Ministry of Health's tally, which included only cases confirmed by reverse-transcription polymerase chain reaction tests, thereby excluding the ELISAs administered in private hospitals. Criticizing private hospitals' use of new antigen-testing technology that have much lower sensitivity, the Chamber of Physicians expressed concern over the decentralization of data collection.

On 3 April, citing potential asymptomatic transmission of SARS-CoV-2 by children, the Ministry of Health extended the curfew, which initially applied only to those 65 and older, to people 20 and younger. In a televised address the same day, President Erdoğan announced measures prohibiting entry into and exit from Turkey's largest cities, including Istanbul, for 15 days.

On 6 April, the government announced the building of two hospitals at Istanbul Airport that could accommodate 2,000 patients and would specialize in common life-support techniques, such as Extracorporeal membrane oxygenation (ECMO), for people with severe cases of COVID-19. On the same day, to promote face-mask use, the government started to mail masks (Note: Masks were sent on request, and limited to five masks per person per week.) to everyone.

On 10 April, the Ministry of Internal Affairs announced curfew with just two hours' notice. This resulted in pandemonium, with residents lining up by bakeries, shops, and markets to stock up on essentials. After widespread criticism, Soylu was forced to apologize and offer his resignation, which Erdoğan rejected.

On 13 April, Erdoğan announced that curfews on weekends would continue but the restrictions were less stringent during the week, and many non-essential businesses, including construction sites remained open.

On 23 April, Turkey became the seventh country to report more than 100,000 coronavirus cases.

=== May 2020: Easing on restrictions ===
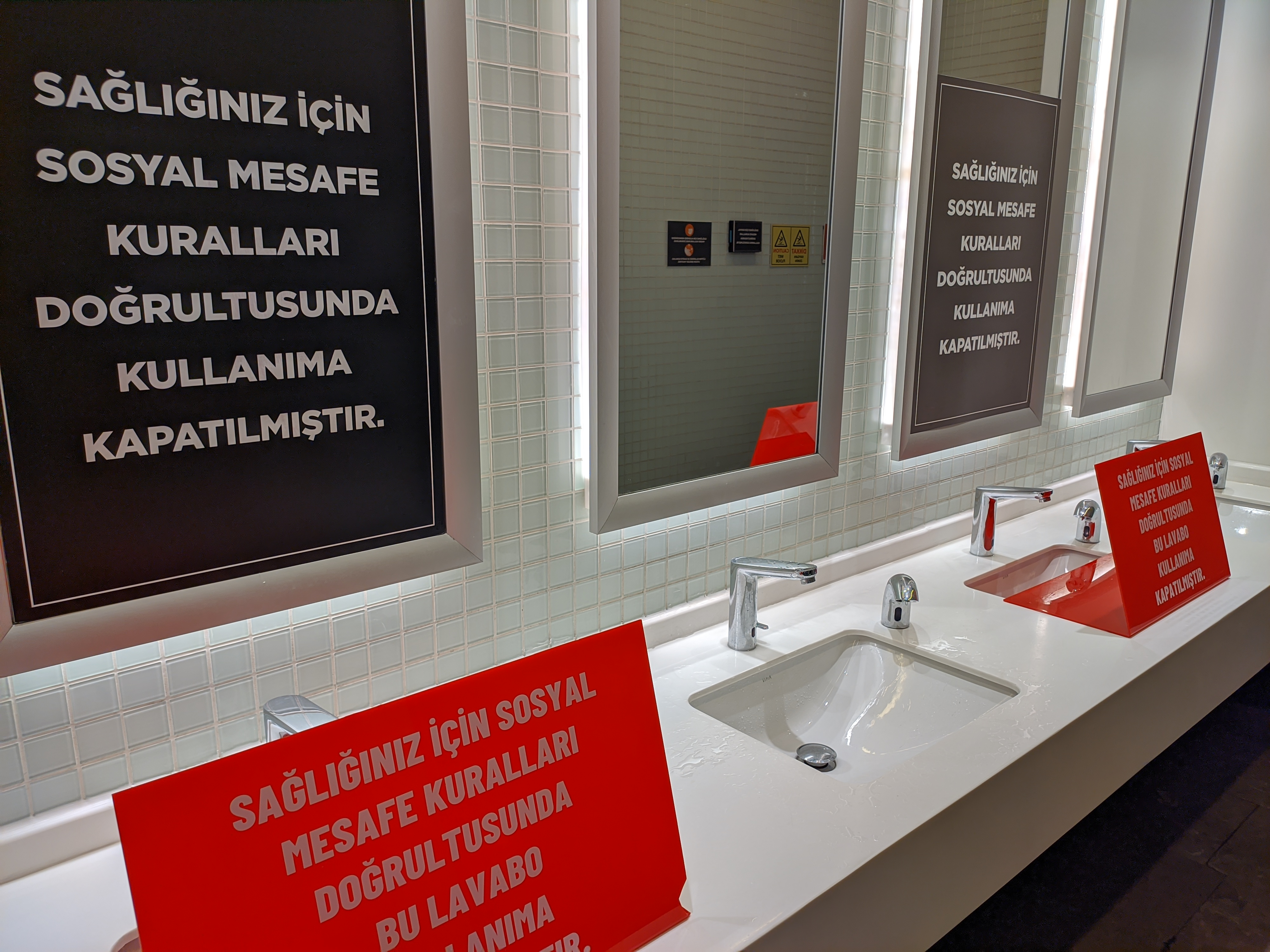
Social distance warnings in a mall's toilet.

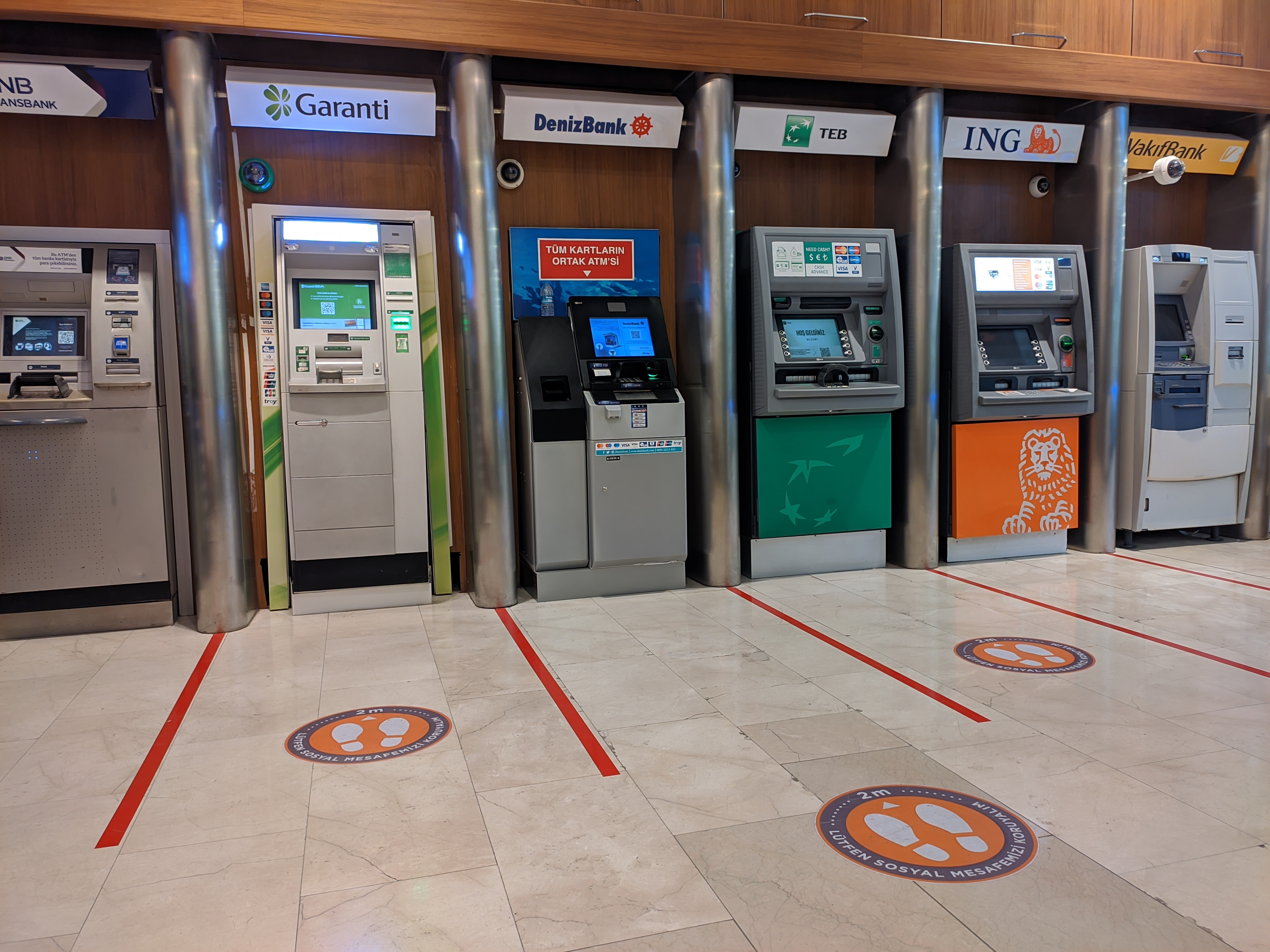
Social distance stickers placed on the floor in the ATM part of a shopping mall.

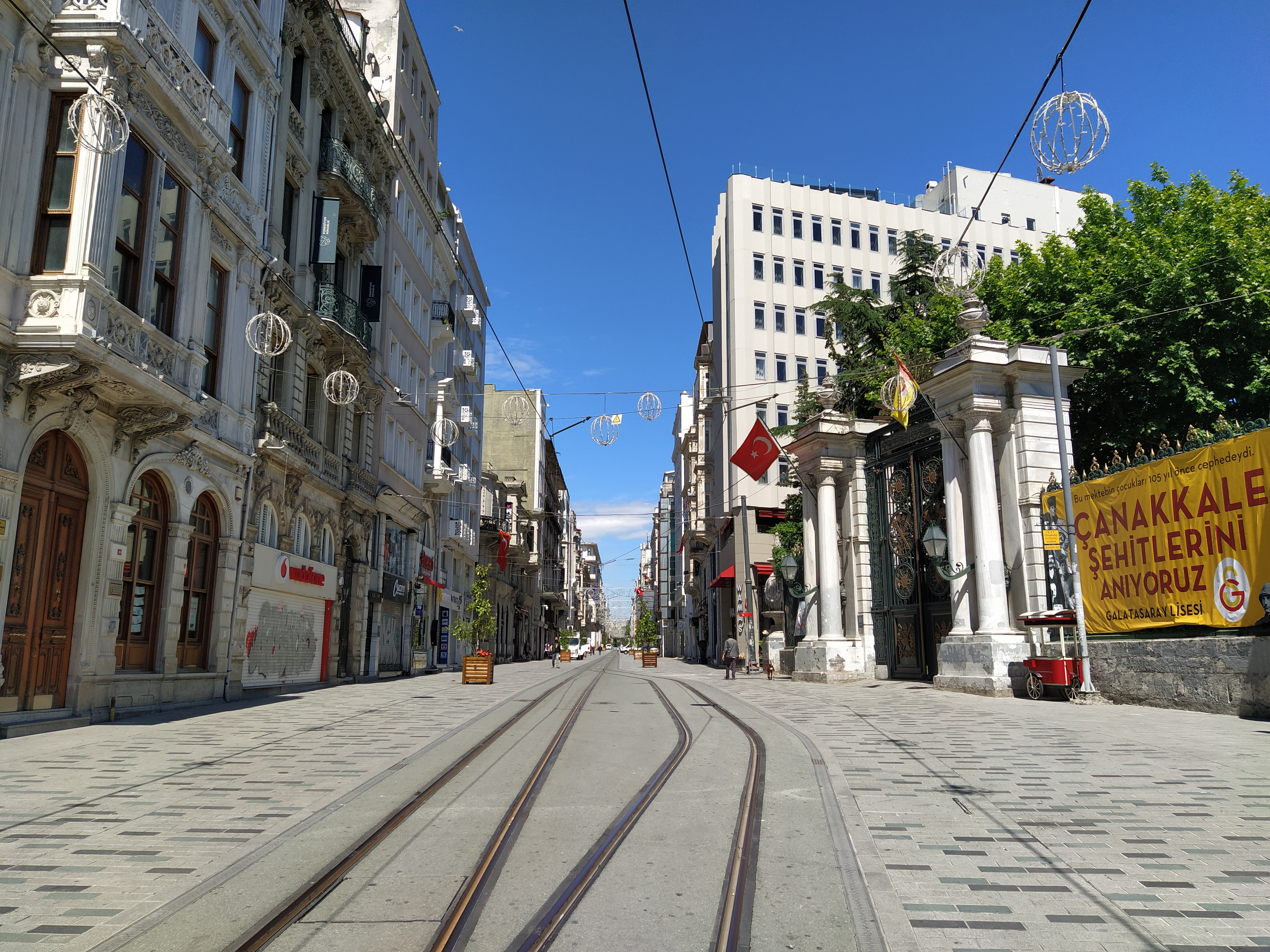
İstiklal Avenue and Galatasaray, Beyoğlu during the curfew on 30 May 2020

On 4 May, the Coronavirus Scientific Advisory Board stated that public-health interventions—lockdowns and mask use—had led to major drops in caseloads, reducing the strain on emergency rooms and intensive-care units. Explaining that normal life would return gradually, the Ministry of Health said that Turkey had an opportunity to create and upgrade to permanently pandemic-resistant cities by subsidizing businesses to make ventilation upgrades to limit viral spread, tackling poor indoor air quality, which has long been a source of disease.

State lawmakers' response to the Ministry of Health's handling of the pandemic broke down along partisan lines. On 5 May, the opposition criticized the fact that businesses had no clear triggers for when and how to shut down or reduce capacity in buildings.

On 7 May, the government acknowledged that the social-distancing measures, including the closure of offices and schools and ban on mass gatherings were rolled out without knowing which measures would work. Ministry of Health stated that by relaxing restrictions gradually, it could make more informed recommendations on social-distancing measures in the future.

=== June 2020: Reopening ===
On 1 June, domestic flights resumed and most public spaces opened, including restaurants, swimming pools, beaches, parks, libraries, and museums.

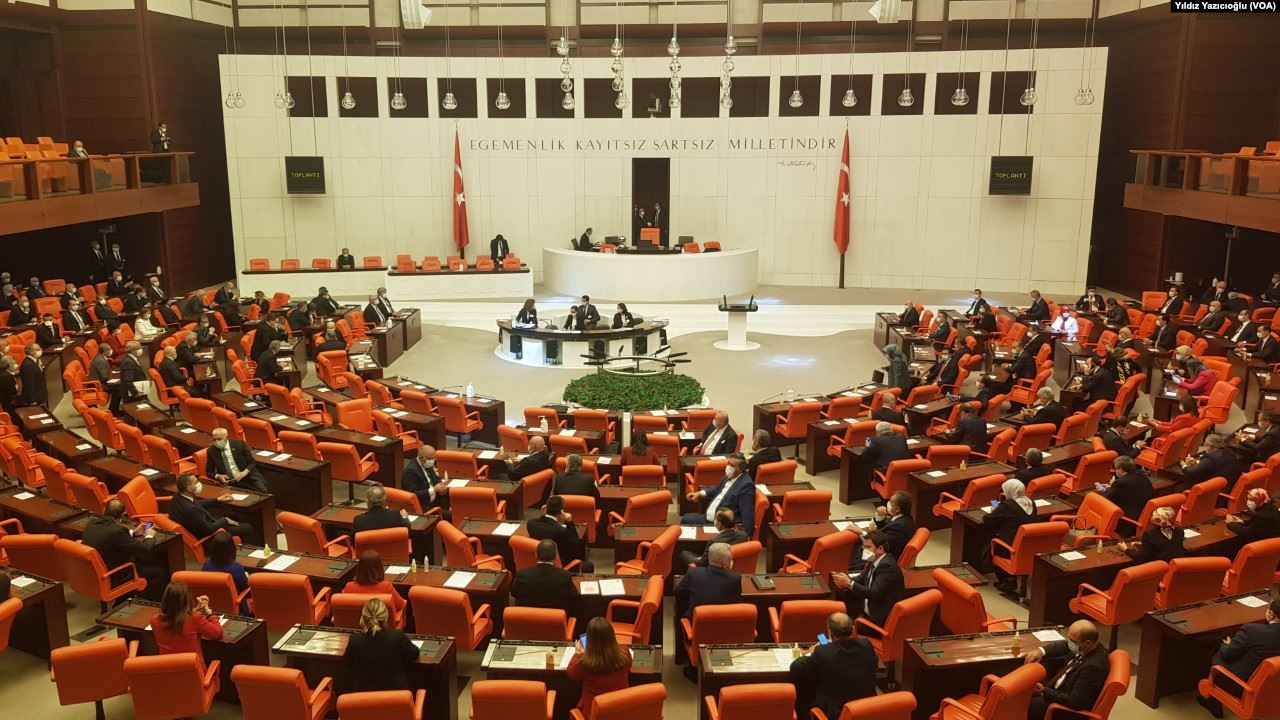
Turkish parliament resumes work after COVID-19 hiatus, while wearing masks and keeping distance

On 2 June, the Turkish Parliament resumed full activities for the first time in 48 days since a hiatus was declared due to the pandemic. The parliament started working under "new norms", including enhanced hygiene measures, use of masks, and social distancing.

=== July 2020: Turkey opens for tourism ===
In July, Erdoğan urged a rewrite of Coronavirus Scientific Advisory Board guidelines to discourage reporting asymptomatic people who tested positive for SARS-CoV-2. Over the objections of Coronavirus Scientific Advisory Board scientists, Ministry of Health started to publish incomplete coronavirus tallies on 29 July.

=== August 2020: Turkey remains open for tourism ===
Gross domestic product shrank 11% in the second quarter, the largest decline ever published by the Turkish Statistical Institute. The worst-affected sector was manufacturing, which contracted by 18%.

On 30 August, mayors of Istanbul and Ankara Ekrem İmamoğlu and Mansur Yavaş said that there was a mismatch between the statistics reported by Ministry of Health and the local data, and accused the national government of covering up the coronavirus resurgence.

=== September 2020: Further economic measures announced ===
On 18 September, as part of statutory measures taken to counter the pandemic's impact on the economy, a presidential decree extended the rule that limits corporations' dividends to 25% of their net profits in 2019. The rule, initially included in the Turkish Commercial Code as provisional article 13, was to phase out on 30 September.

=== October 2020: Reintroduction of restrictions ===
In October, official figures showed that 9.3 million people visited Turkey in the first eight months of this year, mainly from Russia, the United Kingdom, Ukraine, Germany and Bulgaria, with 2.2 million arriving in August.

On 2 October, the Minister of Internal Affairs, following an advisory opinion of the Coronavirus Scientific Advisory Board, instructed all provinces to prohibit holding large public meetings until 1 December.

=== November 2020: New lockdown ===
On 20 November, the Ministry of Health reinstated the curfew on people 65 and older and 20 and younger. On the same day, the Minister of Internal Affairs ordered businesses and places of worship to halt indoor activities. Grocery stores and pharmacies remained open, with legally imposed capacity limits.

On 30 November, official figures showed that gross domestic product expanded 15.6% compared with the previous quarter, and 6.7% compared with a year earlier.

=== December 2020: Rising death roll and assessment of coronavirus vaccines ===
Rate of vaccination by provinces (update 28 June 2021)

On 6 December, Ministry of Health Fahrettin Koca announced that 50 million doses of CoronaVac should arrive by the end of February 2021, and 10 million doses of the Pfizer–BioNTech COVID-19 vaccine should start arriving during December.

On 7 December, Pfizer and BioNTech finalized their submission to the Turkish Medicines and Medical Devices Agency (TMA), which had been reviewing data from the clinical trial since October. The TMA said it would recommend granting an emergency use authorization if it concluded "that the benefits of the vaccine outweigh its risks in protecting against COVID-19", based on the 2004 law that created the TMA's process.

On 10 December, the seven-day averages for three of the primary metrics (tests, cases, hospitalizations) were at record highs. In the spring of 2020, during the first COVID-19 surge, the rising death toll reached a peak on 22 April, with a seven-day average of 122 daily deaths. In December, the seven-day average of deaths from COVID-19 broke that record, at 255 on 29 December.

On 13 December, TMA pushed back formal assessments of two COVID-19 vaccines, delaying distribution of the Pfizer–BioNTech COVID-19 vaccine and CoronaVac in Turkey to the end of December. The TMA said it planned to give an opinion on the Pfizer–BioNTech COVID-19 vaccine at a meeting on 29 December. TMA also delayed assessing the rival Moderna vaccine until 12 January.

=== January 2021: Vaccination and the UK variant ===
Turkey detected 15 cases of the UK coronavirus variant on 1 January 2021. On 14 January 2021, Erdoğan received the COVID-19 vaccine.

=== March 2021 ===
At the beginning of March, the Turkish government eased restrictions, but infection rates rose to 21,030. Turkey had a very bad tourism season due to the restrictions, but bars and restaurants were allowed to reopen at half-capacity in provinces with lower infection rates.

On 30 March, after confirming 37,303 new cases, Turkey said it would reimpose lockdowns during weekends and restrictions during Ramadan.

=== April 2021 ===
With the country's infection rate among the highest in Europe, on 29 April 2021, Turkey entered its first nationwide lockdown.

=== February 2022 ===
On February 5, 2022, Erdoğan and his wife, Emine, tested positive for COVID-19. Erdoğan announced that they had been infected with the Omicron variant and had mild symptoms.

== Government response ==
=== Child welfare and education ===
On 12 March 2020, the Ministry of National Education announced that except for schools catering to students with disabilities, all schools would close starting on 16 March. Given the intense learning needs of students with disabilities, the Ministry of National Education announced that elementary-, middle- and high-school students with disabilities would continue to attend school in person in fixed small groups, with adults rotating into the class, so as to facilitate contact tracing. The Ministry of National Education subsequently announced that teachers and staff in schools for students with disabilities are able to opt out of in-person teaching if they or their families had a health risk.

On 17 March, Minister Selçuk said that a subset of teachers were focusing on content generation for the national online platform on TRT EBA TV, which became functional on 23 March, with the rest of the teachers matched to students to provide individual assessment, coaching, and tutoring from 23 March to the end of the semester.

After the Ministry of National Education announced the closure of all schools (except those catering to students with disabilities) on 12 March, the government acknowledged the impact of the closure of schools on the welfare of children. Noting that children with preexisting mental-health issues or who live in non-supportive home environments were likely to suffer from being out of school, the government announced emergency measures, including fund increases for foster children, expansion of the nutrition assistance program, direct payments to families, and a national moratorium on evictions. To alleviate students' social isolation, Selçuk piloted a project on 27 March, where the Ministry of National Education started paying schools to offer small group activities for students on Mondays and Fridays, with deep cleaning sessions in between.

=== Economy ===
Throughout the pandemic, despite additional headwinds such as Saudi bans on Turkish goods, the Turkish economy performed far better than that of many of the country's peers. The International Monetary Fund expected the Turkish economy to contract by 3.6% in 2020, versus 5.3% in Malaysia, 9% in Mexico, 9% in Greece, and 11.3% in Argentina.

Turkey provided a boost to the economy in a series of historically large economic packages. In the ₺141 billion (Note: The ₺141 billion package is the sum of the ₺100 billion measure the government announced plus the ₺41 billion collected through donations.) economic measures package, Parliament provided ₺500 billion ($63 billion) in forgivable loans to small businesses in part by raising the Credit Guarantee Fund (KGF) limit; sent ₺1,500 checks to retired Turks; and disbursed ₺2 billion as unemployment checks.

Unemployment peaked at 12.7% in 2020, and decreased to 11.9% following the economic expansion in the third quarter and governmental job retention programs. But youth unemployment increased to 24.3%, meaning that the demographic least capable of bearing financial pain bore most of it.

=== International aid ===
Countries that received medical supplies/aid from Turkey

During the pandemic, Turkey provided funds, doctors, medical equipment such as PPE, reverse-transcription polymerase chain reaction testing kits, and other assistance to at least 55 countries.

The dispatched medical equipment included 1,300,000 N-95 masks and 300,000 reverse-transcription polymerase chain reaction testing kits in April alone.

By setting itself up as a provider rather than a recipient of aid, Turkey portrayed itself as a valuable partner in combating the global spread of SARS-CoV-2.

== See also ==
- Timeline of the COVID-19 pandemic in Turkey
- Coronavirus Scientific Advisory Board (Turkey)
- 2018–2022 Turkish currency and debt crisis
- COVID-19 pandemic in Northern Cyprus
- COVID-19 pandemic in Europe
- COVID-19 pandemic by country and territory
