= Turkish Pharmacists Association =

The Turkish Pharmacists Association (Türk Eczacıları Birliği) is a professional association established in 1956 in Istanbul. It is a statutory body and a public institution. Its headquarters moved from Istanbul to Ankara in 1984. It serves about 30,000 pharmacists with 54 Pharmacists Rooms in the provinces of Turkey.

The Turkish Competition Board investigated the association and fined it TL 18,062,307 in 2017 for abusing its dominant position in the market contrary to Law No. 4054 on the Protection of Competition, but the decision was annulled in December 2021.

Erdoğan Çolak is the chairman of the association. During the Turkish currency and debt crisis, 2018 he reported on the difficulties in securing supplies of medication.

It is the main supplier of orphan drugs, on a named patient basis.

The association had a legal monopoly on the importation of medication into Turkey until 2013 when the Turkish Medicines and Medical Devices Agency permitted some pharmacies to import independently, although the Association successfully contested this decision. Under Law No. 7151 on Amendment of Certain Laws and Decree Laws related to Healthcare, published in December 2018 the Social Security Institution and state institutions and organisations approved by the Ministry of Health (Turkey) can import medicine.
