= List of hospitals in Bursa Province =

This is a list of hospitals in Bursa Province, Turkey.

== State hospitals ==
- Bursa Devlet Hastanesi
- Gemlik Devlet Hastanesi
- Harmancık Devlet Hastanesi
- İnegöl Devlet Hastanesi
- İznik Devlet Hastanesi
- Karacabey Devlet Hastanesi
- Mudanya Devlet Hastanesi
- Mustafakemalpaşa Devlet Hastanesi
- Orhaneli Devlet Hastanesi
- Orhangazi Devlet Hastanesi
- Yenişehir Devlet Hastanesi
- Bursa Şehir Hastanesi

== Social security hospitals ==
- SSK Demirtaş Polikliniği
- SSK Duaçınar Polikliniği
- SSK Gemlik Hastanesi
- SSK Hastanesi
- SSK İnegöl Hastanesi
- SSK Karacabey İstasyonu
- SSK Kestel İstasyonu
- SSK Orhangazi İstasyonu
- SSK P. Sanayi Polikliniği
- SSK Şevket Yılmaz Hastanesi

== Birth hospitals ==
- Zübeyde Hanım Doğumevi

== University hospitals ==
- Uludağ Üniversitesi Tıp Fakültesi Hastanesi

== Special hospitals ==
- A.O.S. Onkoloji Hastanesi
- Bursa Çocuk Hastanesi
- Göğüs Hastanesi
- Yüksek İhtisas Hastanesi
- Dr. Ayten BOZKAYA Spastik Çocuklar Hastanesi ve Rehabilitasyon Merkezi

== Private hospitals ==
- Özel Bursa Anadolu Hastanesi
- Özel Acıbadem Bursa Hastanesi
- Özel Jimer Hastanesi
- Özel Ceylan İnternational Hospital
- Özel Medicabil Hastanesi
- Özel Gümüş Göl Hastanesi
- Özel Retinagöz Hastanesi
- Özel Esentepe Hastanesi
- Özel VM Medical Park Bursa Hastanesi
- Özel Doruk Bursa Hastanesi
- Özel Hayat Hastanesi
- Özel Çekirge Kalp ve Aritmi Hastanesi
- Özel Dünya Göz Bursa Hastanesi
- Özel Doruk Yıldırım Hastanesi
- Özel Aritmi İnegöl Hastanesi
- Özel Cihangir Hastanesi
- Özel Romatem FTR Hastanesi
- Özel Pembe Mavi Hastanesi
- Özel Aritmi Osmangazi Hastanesi
- Özel Medicana Bursa Hastanesi
- Özel Medicabil Yıldırım Hastanesi
