= Mehmet Işık =

Turkish politician

Member of the 22nd Parliament of Turkey

Personal details
- Born: Giresun, Turkey
- Died: February 10, 2022 (aged 83–84) Istanbul, Turkey
- Party: Republican People's Party
- Occupation: Politician

Mehmet Işık (1938, Giresun, Turkey – 10 February 2022, Istanbul, Turkey) was a Turkish politician.

== Biography ==
He graduated from Istanbul University Faculty of Forestry. He worked as Regional Chief of Forestry, Directorate of Operations, Giresun and Isparta Regional Chief Directorate of Forestry, and Mayor of Giresun Municipality for two terms. He is Giresun Deputy of the 22nd Term of the Grand National Assembly of Turkey. He is married and has four children.

He died on 10 February 2022 in Istanbul in the hospital where he was being treated.

After Işık's death, his daughter Elvan Işık Gezmiş was elected as an MP for Giresun in the 2023 Turkish general elections and entered the Turkish Grand National Assembly.
