= Istanbul Medical Chamber =

The Istanbul Medical Chamber (Turkish: İstanbul Tabip Odası) is a medical association in Istanbul, Turkey. Founded in 1929, it is an affiliate of the Turkish Medical Association.
