= List of hospitals in Balıkesir Province =

This is a list of hospitals in Balıkesir Province, Turkey.

== State hospitals ==
- Ayvalık Devlet Hastanesi
- Balıkesir Devlet Hastanesi
- Balıkesir Göğüs Hastalıkları Hastanesi
- Bandırma Devlet Hastanesi
- Bigadiç Devlet Hastanesi
- Burhaniye Devlet Hastanesi
- Dursunbey Devlet Hastanesi
- Edremit Devlet Hastanesi
- Gönen Devlet Hastanesi
- Sındırgı Devlet Hastanesi
- Susurluk Devlet Hastanesi

== Social security hospitals ==
- SSK Balıkesir Hastanesi
- SSK Bandırma Hastanesi
- SSK Bigadiç Hastanesi
- SSK Edremit Hastanesi

== Military hospitals ==
- Balıkesir Asker Hastanesi
- Edremit Asker Hastanesi
