= Libraries in Turkey =

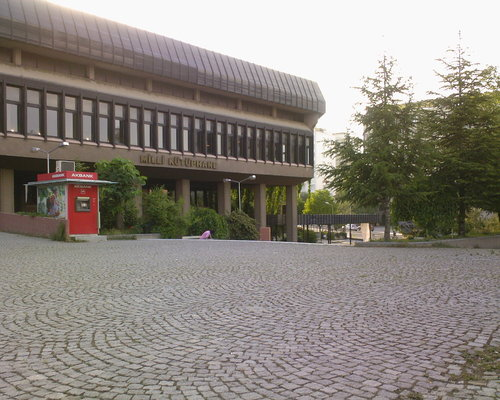
National Library

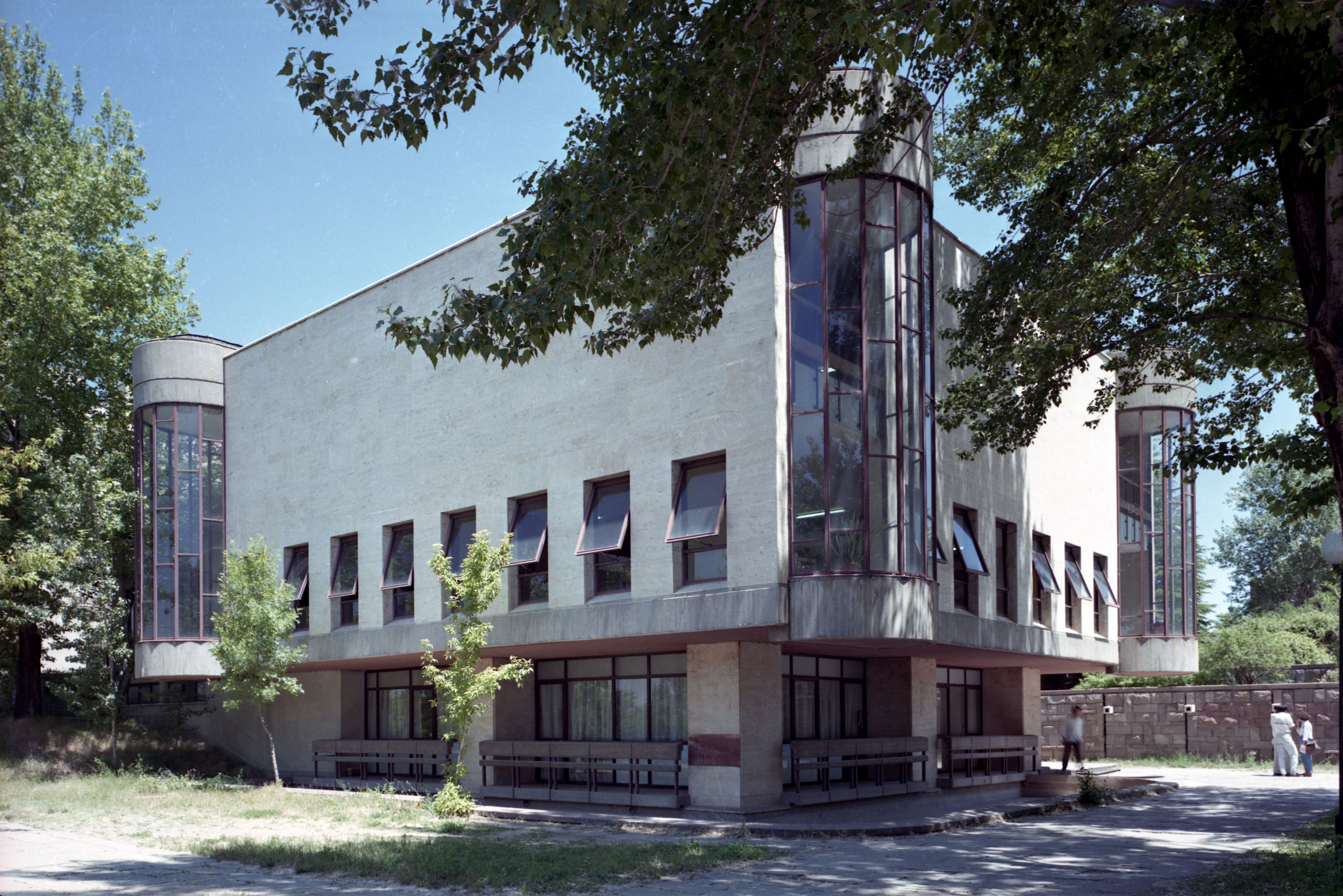
Middle East Technical University Library

There are four type of libraries in Turkey.

1. National Library
2. Public Libraries
3. School libraries
4. University libraries

In 2017 the Turkish Statistical Institute published the data about the libraries in Turkey (as of 31.12.2016)

Library type	Number of libraries	Total no. of books	Number of users
National Library	1	1,298,952	636,488
Public Libraries	1,137	18,828,188	23,266,599
University Libraries	552	15,236,013	
School Libraries	27,280	27,430,168	
Total	28,970	62,793,321	
