= Turkish Medicines and Medical Devices Agency =

Turkish regulatory authority

- Türkiye İlaç ve Tıbbi Cihaz Kurumu
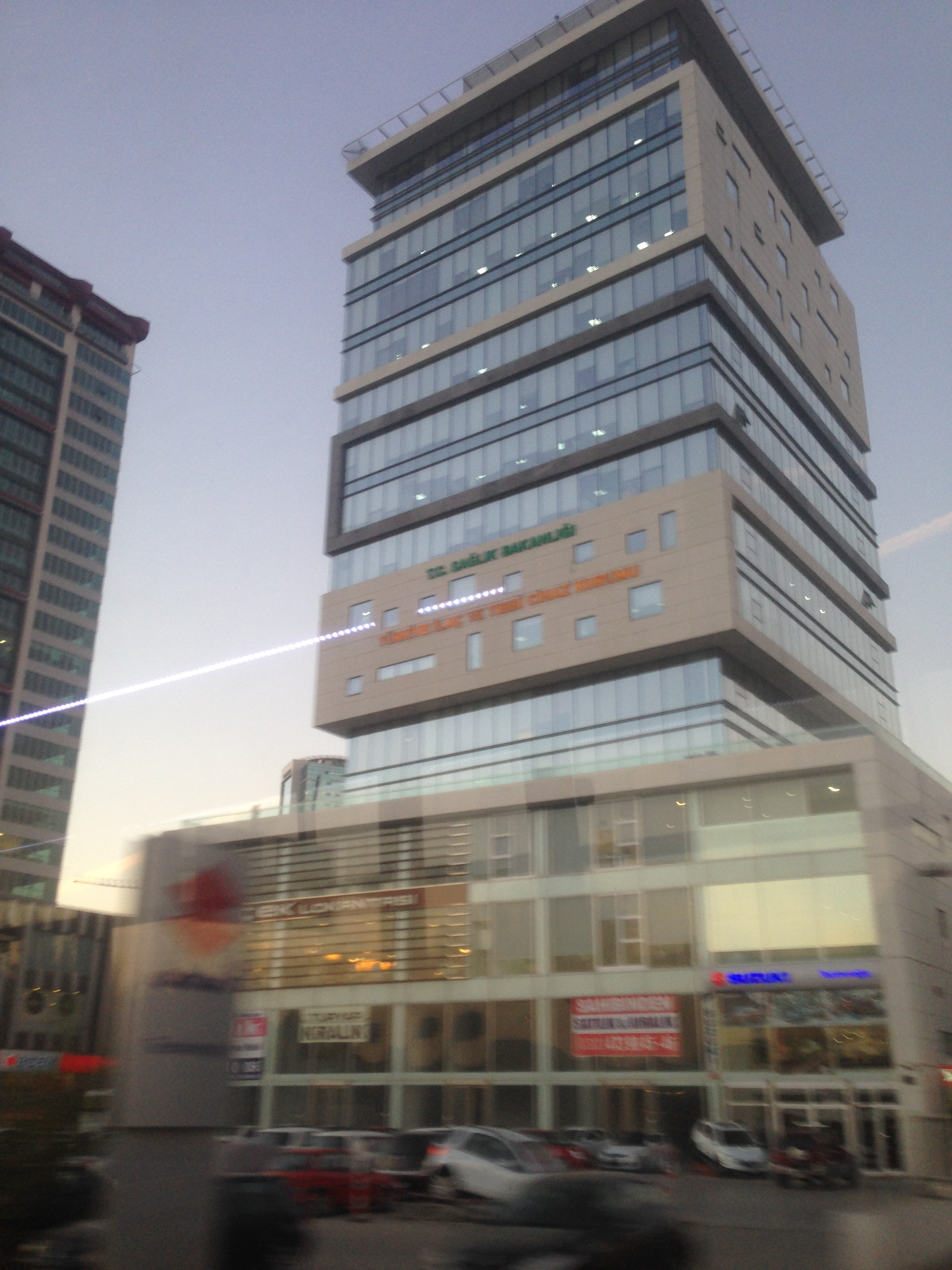

Agency overview
- Formed: 1936
- Preceding agency: Pharmacy and Preparations Branch, General Directorate of Pharmaceuticals and Pharmacy
- Jurisdiction: Government of Turkey
- Headquarters: Ankara, Turkey
- Agency executive: Prof. Dr. Ahmet Ayar, Chairman
- Parent agency: Ministry of Health
- Website: titck.gov.tr

The Turkish Medicines and Medical Devices Agency (TMMDA; Turkish: Türkiye İlaç ve Tıbbi Cihaz Kurumu) is a regulatory agency of the Government of Turkey that acts as the highest sanitary authority in terms of medical safety on medicines, health products, cosmetics and personal care products.

It is responsible for the enforcement of the Turkish Cosmetic regulations, which came into effect in 2005. The current Medical Device Regulation came into force on June 7, 2011. A new draft regulation aligned with the new European regulation was published in 2018.

In 2013 the Agency proposed to permit some pharmacies to import medicine independently, bypassing the Turkish Pharmacists Association although the Association successfully contested this decision. Under Law No. 7151 on Amendment of Certain Laws and Decree Laws related to Healthcare, published in December 2018 the Social Security Institution and state institutions and organisations approved by the Ministry of Health can import medicine. It announced principles for the approval of secondary packaging and storage facilities for pharmaceuticals in January 2019.

== See also ==
- Health care in Turkey
- Ministry of Health
- Pharmacoepidemiology
