= List of ministers of health of Turkey =

Minister of Health of Turkey
- Sağlık Bakanı
- Flag of Turkey

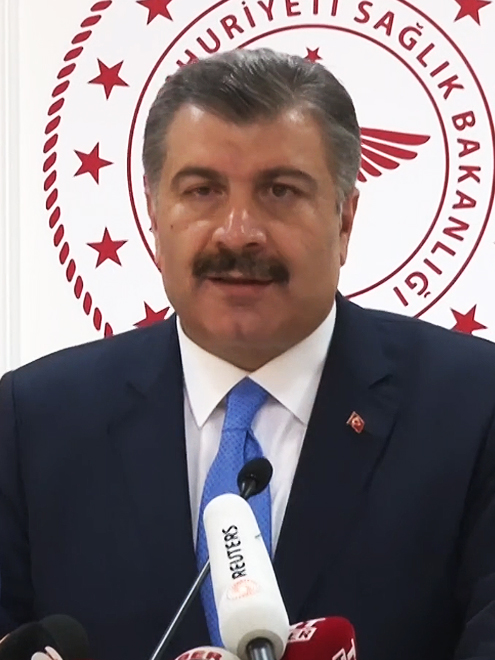
- Incumbent; Fahrettin Koca since 10 July 2018
- Ministry of Health
- Member of: Cabinet of Turkey
- Reports to: President of Turkey
- Seat: Ankara
- Appointer: President of Turkey
- Inaugural holder: Adnan Adıvar
- Formation: 3 May 1920
- Website: Ministry of Health, Turkey

The minister of health (Turkish: Sağlık Bakanı) is the head of the Ministry of Health and a member of the Cabinet of Turkey. The current minister of health is Fahrettin Koca (independent), who has been in office since 10 July 2018.

#	Minister	Took office	Left office	Party
1	Dr. Adnan Adıvar	3 May 1920	10 March 1921	Independent
2	Dr. Refik Saydam	10 March 1921	20 December 1921	Independent
3	Dr. Rıza Nur	24 December 1921	27 October 1923	Independent
(2)	Dr. Refik Saydam	30 October 1923	21 November 1924	Republican People's Party
4	Dr. Mazhar Germen	22 November 1924	3 March 1925	Republican People's Party
(2)	Dr. Refik Saydam	4 March 1925	25 October 1937	Republican People's Party
5	Dr. Ahmet Hulusi Alataş	25 October 1937	18 January 1945	Republican People's Party
6	Dr. Sadi Konuk	18 January 1945	5 August 1946	Republican People's Party
7	Dr. Behçet Uz	7 August 1946	10 June 1948	Republican People's Party
8	Dr. Kemali Bayazıt	10 June 1948	22 May 1950	Republican People's Party
9	Prof. Dr. Nihat Reşat Belger	22 May 1950	19 September 1950	Democrat Party
10	Dr. Ekrem Hayri Üstündağ	20 September 1950	17 May 1954	Democrat Party
(7)	Dr. Behçet Uz	18 May 1954	9 December 1955	Democrat Party
11	Nafiz Körez	9 December 1955	25 November 1957	Democrat Party
12	Dr. Lütfi Kırdar	26 November 1957	27 May 1960	Democrat Party
13	Prof. Dr. Nusret Karasu	27 May 1960	25 August 1960	Military
-	Prof. Dr. Nusret Hasan Fişek (acting)	25 August 1960	5 September 1960	Military
14	Prof. Dr. Salih Ragıp Üner	5 September 1960	20 November 1961	Military
15	Dr. Süleyman Suat Seren	20 November 1961	26 June 1962	Justice Party
16	Dr. Yusuf Azizoğlu	26 June 1962	26 October 1963	New Turkey Party
17	Prof. Dr. Fahrettin Kerim Gökay	5 November 1963	26 December 1963	New Turkey Party
18	Dr. Kemal Demir	26 December 1963	20 February 1965	Republican People's Party
19	Dr. Faruk Sükan	22 February 1965	27 October 1965	Justice Party
20	Dr. Edip Somunoğlu	27 October 1965	1 April 1967	Justice Party
21	Dr. Vedat Ali Özkan	1 April 1967	12 March 1971	Justice Party
22	Prof. Dr. Türkan Akyol	26 March 1971	13 December 1971	Independent
23	Dr. Cevdet Aykan	13 December 1971	23 May 1972	Republican People's Party
(18)	Dr. Kemal Demir	23 May 1972	16 April 1973	Republican People's Party
24	Dr. Vefa Tanır	16 April 1973	26 January 1974	Justice Party
25	Dr. Selahattin Cizrelioğlu	26 January 1974	18 November 1974	Republican People's Party
(18)	Dr. Kemal Demir	18 November 1974	18 April 1977	Republican People's Party
(24)	Dr. Vefa Tanır	18 April 1977	21 June 1977	Justice Party
26	Prof. Dr. Celal Ertuğ	21 June 1977	21 July 1977	Republican People's Party
27	Cengiz Gökçek	21 July 1977	5 January 1978	Nationalist Movement Party
28	Dr. Mete Tan	5 January 1978	12 November 1979	Republican People's Party
29	Dr. Münif İslamoğlu	12 November 1979	12 September 1980	Justice Party
30	Prof. Dr. Necmi Ayanoğlu	22 September 1980	23 December 1981	Military
31	Prof. Dr. Kaya Kılıçturgay	23 December 1981	23 December 1983	Military
32	Mehmet Aydın	23 December 1983	17 October 1986	Motherland Party
33	Dr. Mustafa Kalemli	17 October 1986	21 December 1987	Motherland Party
34	Bülent Akarcalı	21 December 1987	26 June 1988	Motherland Party
35	Cemil Çiçek	26 June 1988	26 July 1988	Motherland Party
36	Nihat Kitapçı	6 July 1988	31 March 1989	Motherland Party
37	Halil Şıvgın	31 March 1989	23 June 1991	Motherland Party
38	Dr. Yaşar Eryılmaz	23 June 1991	20 November 1991	Motherland Party
39	Dr. Yıldırım Aktuna	20 November 1991	25 June 1993	True Path Party
40	Rıfat Serdaroğlu	25 June 1993	28 November 1993	True Path Party
41	Kazım Dinç	28 November 1993	15 August 1994	True Path Party
42	Dr. Doğan Baran	15 August 1994	17 March 1996	True Path Party
(39)	Dr. Yıldırım Aktuna	7 March 1996	26 April 1997	True Path Party
43	Nafiz Kurt	30 April 1997	13 May 1997	True Path Party
44	Dr. İsmail Karakuyu	13 May 1997	30 June 1997	True Path Party
45	Dr. Halil İbrahim Özsoy	30 June 1997	11 January 1999	Motherland Party
46	Dr. Mustafa Güven Karahan	11 January 1999	29 May 1999	Democratic Left Party
47	Dr. Osman Durmuş	29 May 1999	19 November 2002	Nationalist Movement Party
48	Prof. Dr. Recep Akdağ	20 November 2002	24 January 2013	Justice and Development Party
49	Dr. Mehmet Müezzinoğlu	24 January 2013	24 May 2016	Justice and Development Party
(48)	Prof. Dr. Recep Akdağ	24 May 2016	19 July 2017	Justice and Development Party
50	Dr. Ahmet Demircan	19 July 2017	10 July 2018	Justice and Development Party
51	Dr. Fahrettin Koca	10 July 2018	2 July 2024	Independent
52	Dr. Kemal Memişoğlu	2 July 2024	In office	Independent

== See also ==
- Ministry of Health (Turkey)
