= List of international presidential trips made by Serdar Berdimuhamedow =

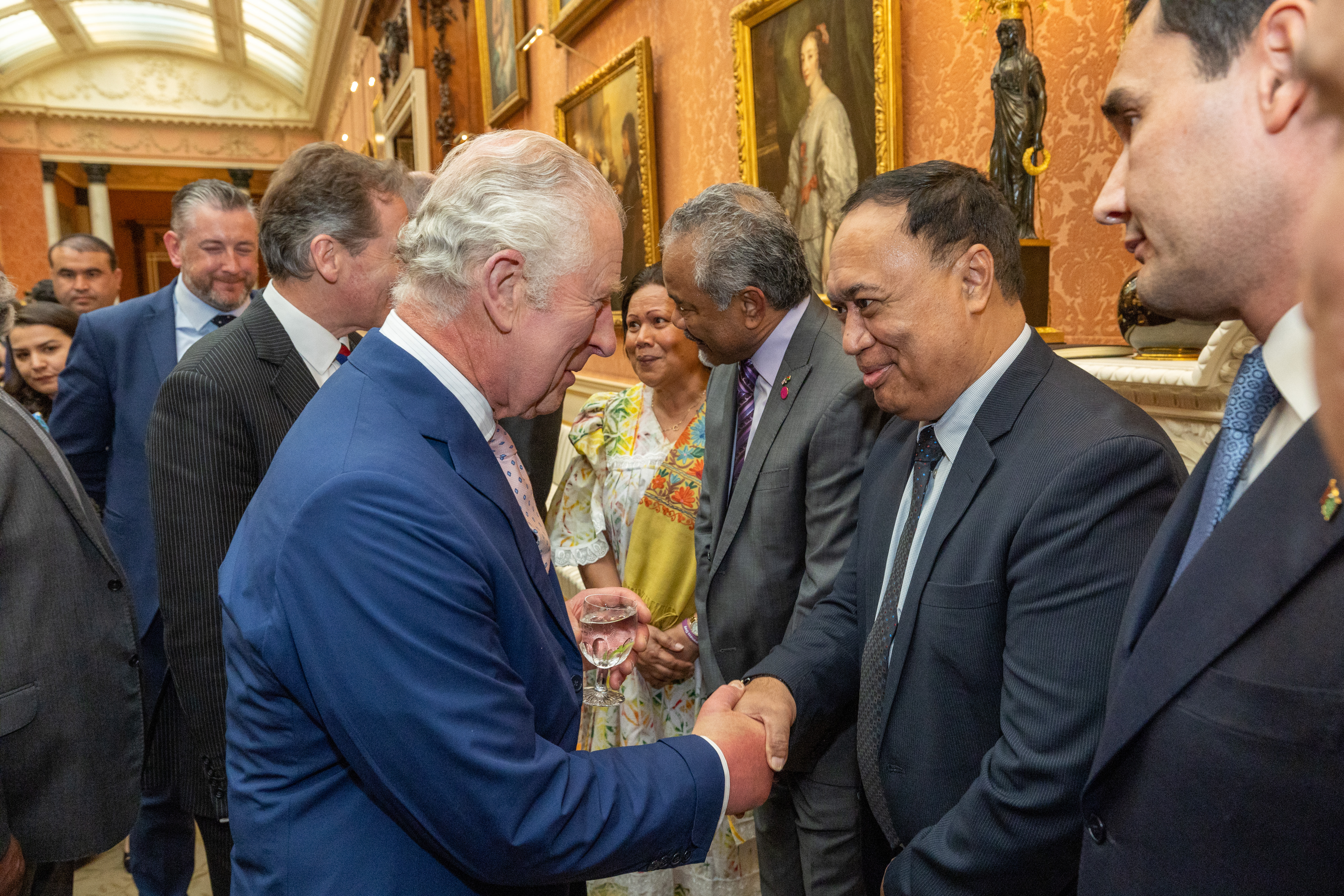
Berdimuhamedov at a reception at Buckingham Palace.

This is a list of presidential trips made by Serdar Berdimuhamedow, the 3rd President of Turkmenistan.

== Summary ==
The number of visits per country where President Berdimuhamedov traveled are:

- One visit to Bahrain, Iran, Japan, Kyrgyzstan, Malaysia, Qatar, Tajikistan, the United Kingdom and the United States
- Two visits to Azerbaijan, China, Saudi Arabia and the United Arab Emirates
- Three visits to Turkey and Uzbekistan
- Four visits to Kazakhstan
- Ten visits to Russia

== 2022 ==
Country	Location	Date	Details
Saudi Arabia	Mecca, Medina	1–2 June	Private visit. Met with Governor Khalid bin Faisal Al Saud.
Russia	Moscow	10 June	State visit. Met with President Vladimir Putin.
Iran	Tehran	15 June	State visit. Met with President Ebrahim Raisi.
Uzbekistan	Tashkent, Khorazm Vilayat	14–15 July	State visit. Met with PresidentShavkat Mirziyoyev.
Kyrgyzstan	Cholpon-Ata	21 July	Working visit. Met with President Sadyr Japarov.
Uzbekistan	Samarkand	15 September	Attended the 2022 SCO summit. Met with President Shavkat Mirziyoyev and President of China Xi Jinping.
Russia	Saint Petersburg	7 October	Attended the CIS summit and met with President Vladimir Putin.
Kazakhstan	Astana	14–15 October	State visit. Met President Kassym-Jomart Tokayev.
United Arab Emirates	Abu Dhabi	21–22 November	State visit. Met with President Mohamed bin Zayed Al Nahyan.
Russia	Saint Petersburg	26–27 December	Working visit. Met with President Vladimir Putin.

== 2023 ==
Country	Location	Date	Details
China	Beijing	5–6 January	State visit.
Bahrain	Muharraq, Manama	21-22 February	Official visit.
Azerbaijan	Baku	2 March	Working visit.
Qatar	Doha	19–20 March	State visit.
United Kingdom	London	6 May	Attended the Coronation of Charles III and Camilla.
Russia	Moscow	9 May	Attended the Moscow Victory Day Parade.
Tajikistan	Dushanbe	10–11 May	State visit. Was postponed exactly a month due to death of Berdimuhamedow's grandmother Ogulabat Berdimuhamedova. He also visited the Varzob District.
China	Beijing	17 May	Working visit.
Turkey	Ankara	3 June	Attended to the Third inauguration of President Erdogan.
Saudi Arabia	Jeddah	18 July	Attended to the GCC summit and met with Crown Prince Mohammed bin Salman.
United States	New York City	17–20 September	Attended to the 78th United Nations General Assembly
Turkey	Ankara	12 October	State visit.
Turkey	Ankara	25-26 October	Official visit.
Uzbekistan	Tashkent	9 November	Attended to the 16th ECO summit.
United Arab Emirates	Dubai	1-2 December	Attended to the 2023 United Nations Climate Change Conference.
Russia	Saint Petersburg	26 December	Working visit.

== 2024 ==
Country	Location	Date	Details
Russia	Moscow	9 May	Attended the 2024 Moscow Victory Day Parade.
Kazakhstan	Astana	9 August	Working visit.
Kazakhstan	Astana	17 September	Attended the Central Asia + Germany Summit.
Russia	Moscow	8 October	Attended the CIS summit.
Russia	Kazan	22-24 October	Attended the 16th BRICS summit.
Malaysia	Kuala Lumpur, Putrajaya	18-19 December	Official visit. Met with Prime Minister Anwar Ibrahim.
Russia	Saint Petersburg	25 December	Attended the informal CIS summit.

== 2025 ==
Country	Location	Date	Details
Uzbekistan	Samarkand	3–4 April	Attended the inaugural EU–Central Asia Summit.
Japan	Osaka	13-15 April	Working visit. Attended Expo 2025.
Russia	Moscow	9 May	Attended the 2025 Moscow Victory Day Parade.
Kazakhstan	Astana	30 May	Working visit for the 1st Central Asia–Italy Summit.
Mongolia	Ulaanbaatar	1–2 June	State visit. First Turkmen presidential visit Mongolia.
Kazakhstan	Astana	16–18 June	Attended the 2025 China–Central Asia Summit.
China	Tianjin	31 August – 3 September	Attended the SCO summit.
China	Beijing	31 August – 3 September	Attended the China Victory Day Parade.
United States	New York City	21-25 September	Attended the 80th United Nations General Assembly.
United States	Washington, D.C.	5-7 November	Attended the 2025 US–Central Asia Summit and met with President Donald Trump.
Japan	Tokyo	18-20 December	Working visit. Attended the Summit of the "Central Asia plus Japan" Dialogue (CA+JAD).
Russia	Saint Petersburg	21-22 December	Attended the informal CIS summit.

== 2026 ==
Country	Location	Date	Details
Kazakhstan	Astana	22 April	Working visit. Attended the RES2026 EXPO and met with President Kassym-Jomart Tokayev.
Azerbaijan	Baku	22–23 June	State visit. Held talks with President Ilham Aliyev, signed a Joint Statement and other bilateral documents. Received the oil tanker Dostluk as a gift.
Georgia	Tbilisi	16-17 July	State visit. Met with Prime Minister Irakli Kobakhidze and President Mikhail Kavelashvili.
Kyrgyzstan	Cholpon-Ata	31 July	Working visit.
South Korea	Seoul	14–17 September	State visit. Attended the 1st Korea-Central Asia Summit and met with President Lee Jae Myung.
Azerbaijan	Baku	15 October	Working visit. Attended the CICA summit.
Armenia	Yerevan	16 October	Working visit. Attended the 17th meeting of the COP 17 for Biodiversity (CBD).
Turkey	Ankara	29–30 October	Working visit. Attended the 13th OTS summit.
Kazakhstan	Astana	5–6 November	Working visit. Attended the Aqaba Process summit.

== Future trips ==
Country	Location	Date	Details
Russia	Saint Petersburg	21 December	Serdar is attend the informal CIS summit.
