= List of research universities in Turkey =

This is a list of research universities in Turkey, as classified by the Council of Higher Education. The list below shows the most recent ranking in 2025.

== Research universities ==
Grade	University	Type	City
A1	Koç University	Private	Istanbul
A1	Sabancı University	Private	Istanbul
A1	Middle East Technical University	Public	Ankara
A1	Istanbul Technical University	Public	Istanbul
A1	Boğaziçi University	Public	Istanbul
A2	Yıldız Technical University	Public	Istanbul
A2	Bilkent University	Private	Ankara
A2	Hacettepe University	Public	Ankara
A2	İzmir Institute of Technology	Public	İzmir
A2	Ankara University	Public	Ankara
A2	Istanbul University	Public	Istanbul
A2	Ege University	Public	İzmir
A2	Gazi University	Public	Ankara
A2	Erciyes University	Public	Kayseri
A2	Sakarya University	Public	Sakarya
A2	Atatürk University	Public	Erzurum
A2	Istanbul University-Cerrahpaşa	Public	Istanbul
A3	Marmara University	Public	Istanbul
A3	Gebze Technical University	Public	Kocaeli
A3	Çukurova University	Public	Adana
A3	Fırat University	Public	Elazığ
A3	Karadeniz Technical University	Public	Trabzon
A3	Bursa Uludağ University	Public	Bursa

== Candidate research universities ==
University	Type	City
Dokuz Eylül University	Public	İzmir
Akdeniz University	Public	Antalya
Selçuk University	Public	Konya
Ondokuz Mayıs University	Public	Samsun
Kocaeli University	Public	Kocaeli
Recep Tayyip Erdoğan University	Public	Rize
İstinye University	Private	Istanbul
TOBB Economy and Technology University	Private	Ankara
Istanbul Medipol University	Private	Istanbul
Özyeğin University	Public	Istanbul

== See also ==
- Research university
