= E-Nabız =

e-Nabiz
- Website type: Personal health portal service
- Available in: Turkish, English, French, German, Russian, Arabic
- Area served: Turkey
- Owner: Ministry of Health (Turkey)
- Website: enabiz.gov.tr
- Commercial: No
- Registration: Yes
- Launched: 2015-01-01
- Current status: Active

e-Nabız (e-Nabiz) is a Turkish health service which can be used to access and manage citizens' personal health data. It is administrated by the Turkish Ministry of Health.
