= Istanbul University-Cerrahpaşa =

Public university in Istanbul, Turkey

- İstanbul Üniversitesi-Cerrahpaşa
- Motto: Turkish: En İyi Olmak İçin...
- Motto in English: To be the Best...
- Type: Public
- Established: 2018
- Rector: Hüseyin Botanlıoğlu
- Location: Istanbul, Turkey; 40°59′09″N 28°43′38″E
- Language: Turkish; English
- Colours: Navy blue and gold,
- Website: www.iuc.edu.tr/en/_

University rankings

Regional – Overall
- QS Emerging Europe and Central Asia: 351-400 (2022)

Istanbul University-Cerrahpaşa is a public university which was formed in Istanbul on 18 May 2018. It takes its name from Cerrah Mehmed Pasha, who gave its name to the Cerrahpaşa, Fatih district in Istanbul. It has nine faculties, six Institutes, one college, five Vocational schools and ten research centers. The rectorate of the university, which has 8 campuses, is located in Avcılar. In addition, the university provides education in two languages, Turkish and English.

== History ==
Istanbul University, in fact, has long since become a comprehensive system more than a university in simple terms: Two of the most prominent medical schools of Turkey were under this university, there are more than one school of same type based on different mentality and aim for economics, business administration, political science etc. An opinion gave rise that separating the system into two would be more effective to manage all the services and in 2018, Istanbul University has been divided into two, one is Istanbul University and the other is Istanbul University-Cerrahpaşa.

The separation has been made by taking the location properties and functionalities into consideration:

- The first modern medical school of Turkey, Istanbul Medical School, also known as "Çapa" leads the first separation and those units located on Çapa, Beyazıt, Vezneciler and some other units remains under the Istanbul University system, istanbul.edu.tr.
- Cerrahpaşa Medical School leads the new separation and those units located on Cerrahpaşa, Avcılar, Sarıyer and some other units form that new separation as Istanbul University-Cerrahpaşa, istanbulc.edu.tr.
- Functionality properties have been also another criterion. For instance, one medical school is under one while the other is under the other, some of the several schools on liberal arts and economics are under one while the others are under the other etc.
- Unlike the University of California system, those two separations are, literally, two distinct universities. There are no chancellors being responsible to a superior president. Both of them have established their own presidencies.

The faculties of the university have a long history. Cerrahpaşa Faculty of Medicine was established in 1827.

== Campuses ==
The university has 8 campuses. These:

Name	Units	Address
Avcılar Campus	Rectorate; Faculty of Engineering; Faculty of Veterinary; Faculty of Sports science; Vocational School of Veterinary Medicine; Institute of Graduate Education; Faculty of Veterinary Medicine Animal Hospital; Biomedical engineering Application and Research Center; Environment and Earth Sciences Application and Research Center; Energy management Application and Research Center; Food Antioxidants Measurement Application and Research Center; Continuing Education Application and Research Center; Geological Museum; Osteoarchaeology Application and Research Center	Istanbul Üniversitesi-Cerrahpaşa Avcılar Campus, 34320 Avcılar, Istanbul
Cerrahpaşa Campus	Rectorate Work Office; Cerrahpaşa Faculty of Medicine; Lung Diseases and Tuberculosis; Institute Institute of Neurological Sciences; Faculty of Dentistry; Behçet's disease Application and Research Center; Pituitary Diseases and Tumors Application and Research Center; Environmental Studies Application and Research Center for Health Institutions; Cerrahpaşa Medical History Museum	Kocamustafapaşa Street 34/E Fatih, Istanbul
Bahçeköy Campus	Rectorate Work Office; Faculty of Forestry; Forestry Vocational School; Isto Herbarium; Insect and Wildlife Collection; Prof. Dr. Adnan Berkel Xylotheque	Valide Sultan Street No:2 34473 Bahçeköy, Istanbul
Bakırköy Campus	Faculty of Health Sciences	Demirkapı Street. 34147 Bakırköy, Istanbul
Büyükçekmece Campus	Rectorate Work Office; Büyükçekmece Congress and Culture Center; Hasan Ali Yücel Faculty of Education; Faculty of Health Sciences; Faculty of Veterinary Medicine; Institute of Forensic Medicine and Forensic Sciences; Vocational School of Technical Sciences; School of Foreign Languages; Faculty of Economics; Faculty of Management; Faculty of Pharmacy; Nanotechnology and Biotechnology Research Institute; Structural and Mechanical Laboratory; Dormitory	Yiğittürk Street No:5/9/1 Büyükçekmece, Istanbul
Sultangazi Campus	Vocational School of Social Sciences; Vocational School of Health Services	Esentepe District 2364. Street No:75/77/999 Sultangazi, Istanbul
Şişli Campus	Rectorate Work Office; Florence Nightingale School of Nursing	Abide-i Hürriyet Street Şişli, Istanbul
Haseki Campus	Cardiology Institute	Haseki Street. No:29/31 Fatih, Istanbul

== Notable alumni ==
- Moshe Arditi, medical researcher and academic, Cedars-Sinai Medical Center and UCLA
- Fahrettin Koca, Minister of Health of the 66th government of Turkey.
- Mehmet Müezzinoğlu, Turkish politician
- Nevzat Tarhan, Turkish medical scientist

== See also ==
- List of universities in Istanbul
- List of universities in Turkey
