= Fahrettin Koca =

Turkish physician and politician (born 1965)

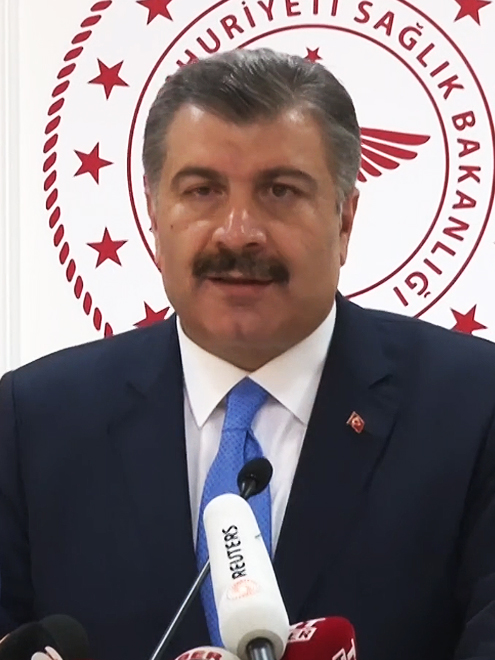
- Koca in 2020

Minister of Health
- In office 10 July 2018 – 2 July 2024
- President: Recep Tayyip Erdoğan
- Preceded by: Ahmet Demircan
- Succeeded by: Kemal Memişoğlu

Personal details
- Born: 2 January 1965 (age 61) Konya, Turkey
- Party: Independent
- Spouse: Hale Koca
- Children: 4
- Education: Medicine
- Alma mater: Istanbul University
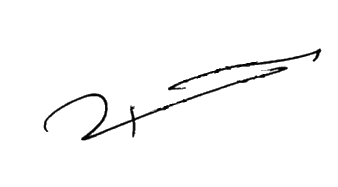
- Signature

Fahrettin Koca (born 2 January 1965) is a Turkish physician and politician. He was the minister of health of the 67th government of Turkey.

== Early life and education ==
Fahrettin Koca was born on 2 January 1965 into a Kurdish family in the village Ömeranlı, Kulu District, Konya Province. Koca is from the tribe of Bekiran. He completed his primary and secondary education in Konya and high school in Bursa. After graduating from Istanbul University Medical School in 1988, he received the title of medical doctor. He completed his specialization in the Department of Child Health and Diseases at the Istanbul University-Cerrahpaşa Medical School.

== Career ==
Koca became a pediatrician in 1995. He worked as a doctor and medical director in various health institutions.

He was the chairman of the Board of Trustees of Istanbul Medipol University, which was founded in 2009 by the Education Health and Research Foundation (TESA), of which he was the founding president. He is a member of the Turkish Pediatrics Institution, the Pediatric Metabolism and Nutrition Association and the Private Hospitals Health Institutions Association (OHSAD). He is also the vice president of the Business Council of the Foreign Economic Relations Council (DEİK) Education Committee and the president of the University Hospitals Association.

=== Political career ===
After the 2018 general elections held in accordance with the amendments from the 2017 Turkish constitutional referendum, Koca was appointed as the minister of health by President Recep Tayyip Erdoğan. He took office on 10 July 2018. On July 2, 2024, he resigned. He was replaced by Istanbul Provincial Health Director Kemal Memişoğlu.

Political offices
| Preceded by Ahmet Demircan | Minister of Health; 10 July 2018–2 July 2024 | Succeeded by Kemal Memişoğlu |
