= 67th cabinet of Turkey =

Members of President Erdoğan's Cabinet

Fifth Erdoğan Cabinet V. Erdoğan Hükûmeti
- 67th Cabinet of Turkey
- 2023–present
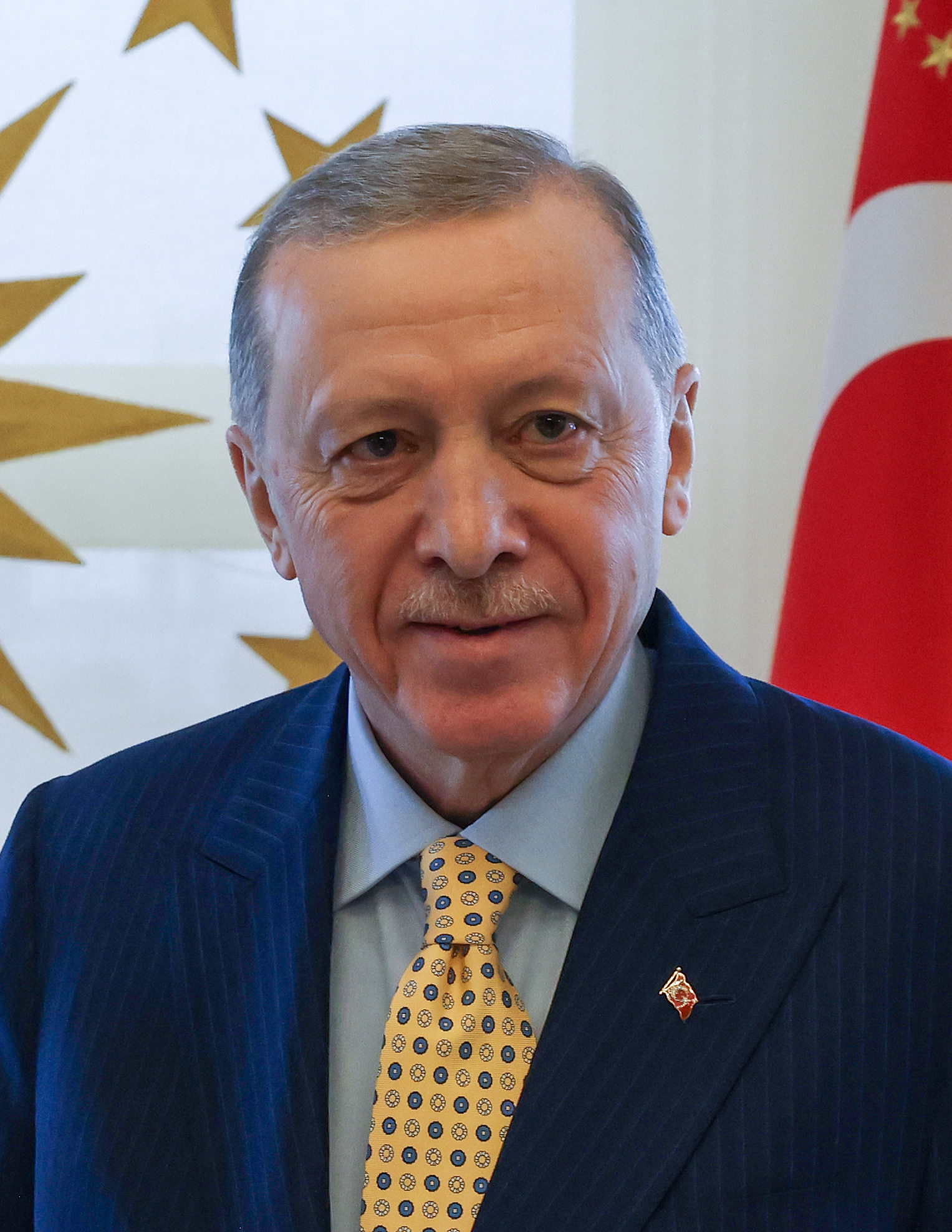
- Date established: 3 June 2023

Leadership and composition
- President: Recep Tayyip Erdoğan
- Vice President: Cevdet Yılmaz
- No. of ministers: 17
- Total no. of members: 19
- Member party: Justice and Development Party
- Status in legislature: Minority with MHP confidence & supply
- Opposition party: Republican People's Party (2023–2026); New Party (2026–)
- Opposition leader: Kemal Kılıçdaroğlu (June 2023 – November 2023); Özgür Özel (November 2023–)

Formation and history
- Election: 2023 Turkish presidential election
- Legislature term: 28th Parliament of Turkey
- Predecessor: 66th cabinet of Turkey

The Fifth Erdoğan Cabinet is the 67th and current government of the Republic of Turkey. It was declared on 3 June 2023. The cabinet was announced after the inauguration of president Erdoğan.

Fahrettin Koca and Mehmet Ersoy are the only ministers who also served in the previous cabinet, though Koca has later been dismissed hence leaving Ersoy, as the sole member of the cabinet having served in the previous one.

== Composition ==
Office	Image	Minister	Party	Took office	Left office
President of Turkey; Cumhurbaşkanı		Recep Tayyip Erdoğan (born 1954)	Justice and Development	3 June 2023	Incumbent
Vice President of Turkey; Cumhurbaşkanı Yardımcısı		Cevdet Yılmaz (born 1967)	Justice and Development	4 June 2023	Incumbent
Ministry of Justice; Adalet Bakanlığı		Yılmaz Tunç (born 1971)	Justice and Development	4 June 2023	11 February 2026
Ministry of Justice; Adalet Bakanlığı		Akın Gürlek (born 1982)	Independent	11 February 2026	Incumbent
Ministry of Family and Social Services; Aile ve Sosyal Hizmetler Bakanlığı		Mahinur Özdemir (born 1982)	Justice and Development	4 June 2023	Incumbent
Ministry of Labour and Social Security; Çalışma ve Sosyal Güvenlik Bakanlığı		Vedat Işıkhan (born 1966)	Justice and Development	4 June 2023	Incumbent
Ministry of Environment, Urbanisation and Climate Change; Çevre, Şehircilik ve İklim Değişikliği Bakanlığı		Mehmet Özhaseki (born 1957)	Justice and Development	4 June 2023	2 July 2024
Ministry of Environment, Urbanisation and Climate Change; Çevre, Şehircilik ve İklim Değişikliği Bakanlığı		Murat Kurum (born 1976)	Justice and Development	2 July 2024	Incumbent
Ministry of Foreign Affairs; Dışişleri Bakanlığı		Hakan Fidan (born 1968)	Justice and Development	4 June 2023	Incumbent
Ministry of Energy and Natural Resources; Enerji ve Tabii Kaynaklar Bakanlığı		Alparslan Bayraktar (born 1975)	Justice and Development	4 June 2023	Incumbent
Ministry of Youth and Sports; Gençlik ve Spor Bakanlığı		Osman Aşkın Bak (born 1966)	Justice and Development	4 June 2023	Incumbent
Ministry of Treasury and Finance; Hazine ve Maliye Bakanlığı		Mehmet Şimşek (born 1967)	Justice and Development	4 June 2023	Incumbent
Ministry of the Interior; İçişleri Bakanlığı		Ali Yerlikaya (born 1968)	Justice and Development	4 June 2023	11 February 2026
Ministry of the Interior; İçişleri Bakanlığı		Mustafa Çiftçi (born 1970)	Independent	11 February 2026	Incumbent
Ministry of Culture and Tourism; Kültür ve Turizm Bakanlığı		Mehmet Ersoy (born 1968)	Independent	4 June 2023	Incumbent
Ministry of National Education; Millî Eğitim Bakanlığı		Yusuf Tekin (born 1970)	Justice and Development	4 June 2023	Incumbent
Ministry of National Defense; Millî Savunma Bakanlığı		Yaşar Güler (born 1954)	Independent	4 June 2023	Incumbent
Ministry of Health; Sağlık Bakanlığı		Fahrettin Koca (born 1965)	Independent	4 June 2023	2 July 2024
Ministry of Health; Sağlık Bakanlığı		Kemal Memişoğlu (born 1966)	Independent	2 July 2024	Incumbent
Ministry of Industry and Technology; Sanayi ve Teknoloji Bakanlığı		Mehmet Fatih Kacır (born 1984)	Independent	4 June 2023	Incumbent
Ministry of Agriculture and Forestry; Tarım ve Orman Bakanlığı		İbrahim Yumaklı (born 1969)	Independent	4 June 2023	Incumbent
Ministry of Trade; Ticaret Bakanlığı		Ömer Bolat (born 1963)	Justice and Development	4 June 2023	Incumbent
Ministry of Transport and Infrastructure; Ulaştırma ve Altyapı Bakanlığı		Abdulkadir Uraloğlu (born 1966)	Justice and Development	4 June 2023	Incumbent
