= Halime Oguz =

Danish politician

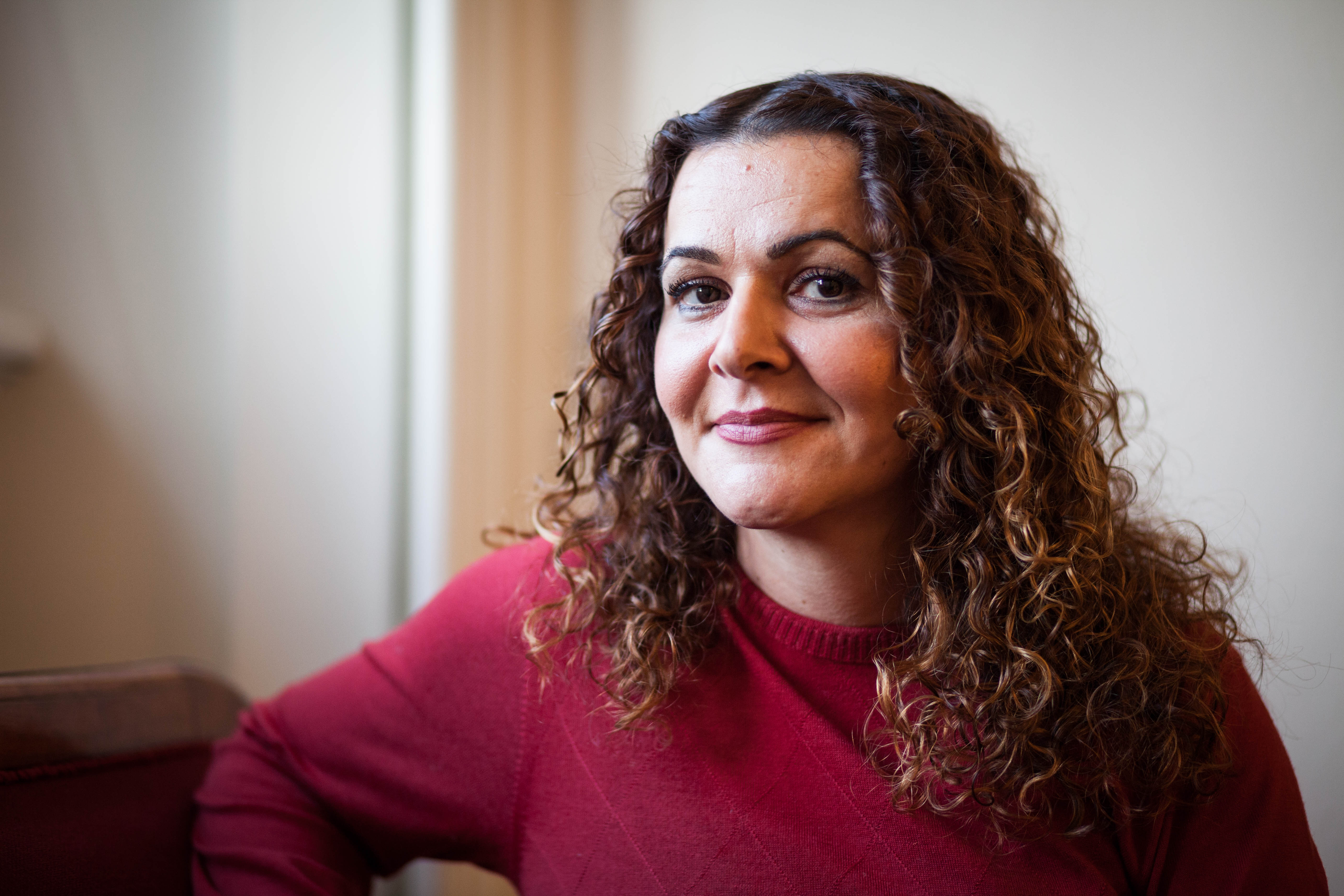
- Halime Oguz, 2018

Member of the Folketing
- Incumbent
- Assumed office 5 June 2019
- Constituency: Copenhagen

Personal details
- Born: 15 June 1970 (age 55) Tavsancali, Turkey
- Party: Socialist People's Party

Halime Oguz (born 15 June 1970 in Tavsancali, Turkey) is a Kurdish-Danish politician, who is a member of the Folketing for the Socialist People's Party. She was elected into parliament at the 2019 Danish general election.

== Life ==
Oguz was born on 15 June 1970 in the Kurdish village Tavsancali in Turkey. Her father moved to Denmark as a guest worker. When Oguz was six years old she joined him in Vollsmose, Odense along with her mother and three brothers. Her parents arranged for her to get engaged to a man from their home village who lived in Switzerland. After a two-year-long long-distance relationship via letters, she broke off the engagement. Shortly after this, Oguz' parents pressured her to marry a different man at the age of 17. With her husband, she lived a life guided by Islam. Unhappy in her marriage, she turned to education, first getting her high school diploma and then studying literature at the University of Southern Denmark in Odense. During her time at university, her mental health declined to the point where she was referred to a psychiatrist. Eventually her relationship ended.

While she still considers herself a Muslim, she is not a practitioner.

== Political career ==
Oguz was elected into parliament at the 2019 election, where she received 1,278 personal votes.
