= Moshe Arditi =

Turkish-American physician

- Occupations: Physician, Researcher
- Known for: Research on Kawasaki disease vasculitis
- Medical career
- Profession: Physician-scientist
- Field: Pediatrics, Biomedical sciences
- Institutions: Cedars-Sinai Medical Center; University of California, Los Angeles
- Research: Kawasaki disease, vasculitis, infectious diseases
- Awards: Pioneer in Medicine Award (2019); Prize for Research in Scientific Medicine (2022)

Moshe Arditi is a Turkish-American physician who holds multiple appointments in the Departments of Biomedical Sciences and Pediatrics at Cedars-Sinai Medical Center, and as a researcher at UCLA. He is a contributor to more than 103 peer reviewed articles.

== Education and career ==
He received his medical degree from Istanbul University-Cerrahpaşa (1981), and then worked in the neonatology laboratory of Yale School of Medicine. He completed postgraduate training at the University of Chicago Pritzker School of Medicine and the Lurie Children's Hospital, affiliated with the Northwestern University Feinberg School of Medicine.

== Research ==
Arditi is noted for his research on Kawasaki disease vasculitis. He received the Cedars-Sinai Pioneer in Medicine Award, 2019, and Cedars-Sinai Prize for Research in Scientific Medicine, 2022.
