= Kemal Memişoğlu =

Minister of Health of Turkey

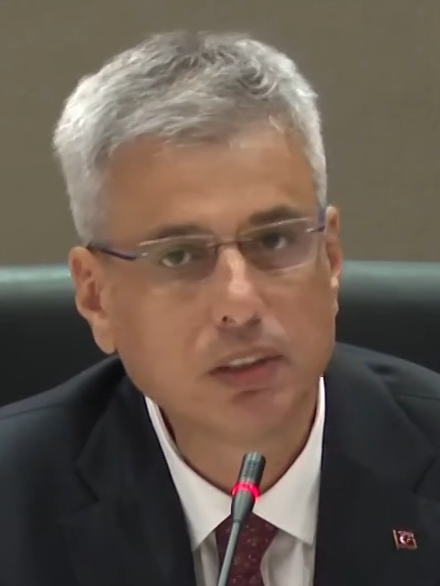
- Memişoğlu in 2024

Minister of Health
- Incumbent
- Assumed office 2 July 2024
- President: Recep Tayyip Erdoğan
- Preceded by: Fahrettin Koca

Provincial Health Director of Istanbul
- In office 6 October 2016 – 2 July 2024

Personal details
- Born: 1966 (age 59–60) Trabzon, Turkey
- Party: AK Party
- Education: Medicine
- Alma mater: Hacettepe University

Kemal Memişoğlu (born 1966) is a Turkish physician, bureaucrat, and politician who is the current Minister of Health of the Republic of Turkey. Prior to his appointment, he was the Provincial Health Director of Istanbul from 2016 to 2024.

== Early life and education ==
He was born in 1966 in Trabzon and his family is from Rize. In 1990, he graduated from Hacettepe University Faculty of Medicine. In 1995, he completed his general surgery specialty training at Okmeydanı Training and Research Hospital.

== Career ==
=== Academic career ===
In 2008, he received the title of Associate Professor of General Surgery and in 2016 he received the title of Professor of General Surgery. He has many scientific articles published in national and international journals.

=== Political career ===
On July 2, 2024, he was appointed as the Minister of Health in the 67th Government by President Recep Tayyip Erdoğan. On the same day, he took over from Fahrettin Koca at a ceremony held at the Ministry of Health. At the ceremony, Memişoğlu stated that Turkey aims to become a world leader in health technology production.

Political offices
Preceded by Fahrettin Koca	Minister of Health; 2 July 2024–present	Succeeded by incumbent
