= Ömeranlı =

Ömeranlı Tavşançalı , Omaro
- Neighbourhood
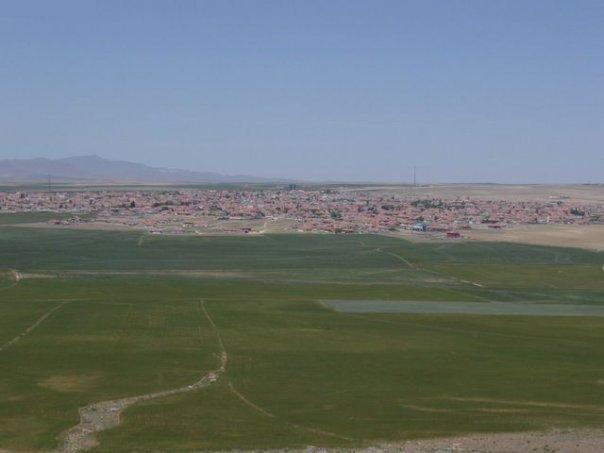

- Location within Turkey Location within Turkey Central Anatolia
- Coordinates: 38.938°N 33.008°E
- Country: Turkey
- Province: Konya
- District: Kulu
- Area: 77 km^{2} (30 sq mi)
- Population (2022): 4,582
  - Density: 60/km^{2} (150/sq mi)
- Time zone: UTC+3 (TRT)

Ömeranlı (Kurdish:Omaro/Omera),(Ottoman Turkish:عمرانلی), (formerly Tavşançalı), is a neighbourhood of the municipality and district of Kulu, Konya Province, Turkey. Its population is 4,582 (2022). Before the 2013 reorganisation, it was a town (belde).

== Population ==
The town is populated by ethnic Kurds of the Reşwan tribe. Many people left the village in the 1990s for Scandinavian countries.

Population development
Year	Pop.	±% p.a.
1985	6,057	—
1990	5,848	−0.70%
1997	5,613	−0.58%
2007	4,372	−2.47%
2012	4,899	+2.30%
2017	4,547	−1.48%
2022	4,582	+0.15%
Source: 1985 census, 1990 census, 1997 census and TÜIK (2007–2022)

== Born ==
- Fahrettin Koca (1965), of Kurdish origin Turkish physician and politician
- Halime Oguz (1970), Kurdish-Danish politician
