= Istanbul Medipol University =

Turkish private university located in İstanbul

Coordinates: 41°05′17″N 29°05′18″E

- İstanbul Medipol Üniversitesi
- Type: Private
- Established: 7 July 2009; 16 years ago
- Affiliations: Joint Commission International; TÜBİTAK; YÖK
- Rector: Bahadır Güntürk
- Faculty: 1,538 (2025)
- Administrative staff: 2,572 (2025)
- Students: 49,757 (2025)
- Doctoral students: 782
- Location: Istanbul, Turkey
- Campus: Urban
- Language: English and Turkish
Colours
Grey, Blue and White
- Website: www.medipol.edu.tr

Istanbul Medipol University (Turkish: İstanbul Medipol Üniversitesi) is a private university in Istanbul, Turkey. The university was established in 2009 by the Turkey Education, Health, and Research Foundation, emphasizes medical education and health sciences. The foundation was established by Fahrettin Koca, who served as the Minister of Health in the 67th government of Turkey.

The university comprises 12 faculties, five institutes, and four vocational schools. As of 2025, the university has a total enrollment of 49,757 students, including 33,216 undergraduates, 1,037 graduate students, and 14,722 associate degree students. The academic staff consists of 1,538 faculty members, supported by 2,572 administrative personnel. The university offers 74 undergraduate programs across 12 faculties, with 24 of these programs conducted in English.

== History ==
Istanbul Medipol University was established on 7 July 2009 by the Medipolitan Education and Health Foundation, now known as the Turkey Education, Health, and Research Foundation. It was granted public legal status as a foundation university.

In 2015, the university's Faculty of Law became a member of the European Law Faculties Association, a network that connects law faculties across Europe for collaborative activities. Additionally, in 2023, the university joined the United Nations Academic Impact. Medipol Mega University Hospital, near Başakşehir in Bağcılar, has been accredited as an Academic Medical Center Hospital by the Joint Commission International.

The university supports a vibrant campus life with 85 student clubs, which organize activities spanning social, cultural, scientific, and personal development, alongside academic enrichment for students.

== Campuses ==
Istanbul Medipol University continues its education and training activities in Kavacık North, Kavacık South and Haliç Campuses. In addition, students' practical courses and internship training continue at Medipol Mega University Hospital.

=== Kavacık Campuses ===
The university's Kavacık campuses are located in Beykoz, close to the Fatih Sultan Mehmet Bridge. Kavacık campuses consist of two campuses. Kavacık North and Kavacık South campuses host education, laboratory, girls' and boys' dormitory buildings, football, tennis and basketball courts, recreation and conversation areas, large halls, classrooms and parking areas.

=== Medipol Mega University Hospital ===
Medipol Mega University Hospital, located in Bağcılar near the Başakşehir, began operations in 2012 under the name Mega Hospitals Complex. It is accredited as an Academic Medical Center Hospital by the Joint Commission International (JCI). The hospital serves as a training facility where students conduct practical courses and complete their internship programs. Medipol Mega University Hospital covers a

closed area of 26,000 m² and has a total of 810 beds, including 215 intensive care units. The hospital is equipped with a heliport area for air transport and features advanced medical procedures, such as the High Intensity Focused Ultrasound and robotic surgery. In 2017, Medipol Mega University Hospital became the first and only private hospital in Turkey to receive the HIMSS Level 6 certification following a digital hospital assessment. Also, it's the tallest hospital in Turkey with a height of 136 meters.

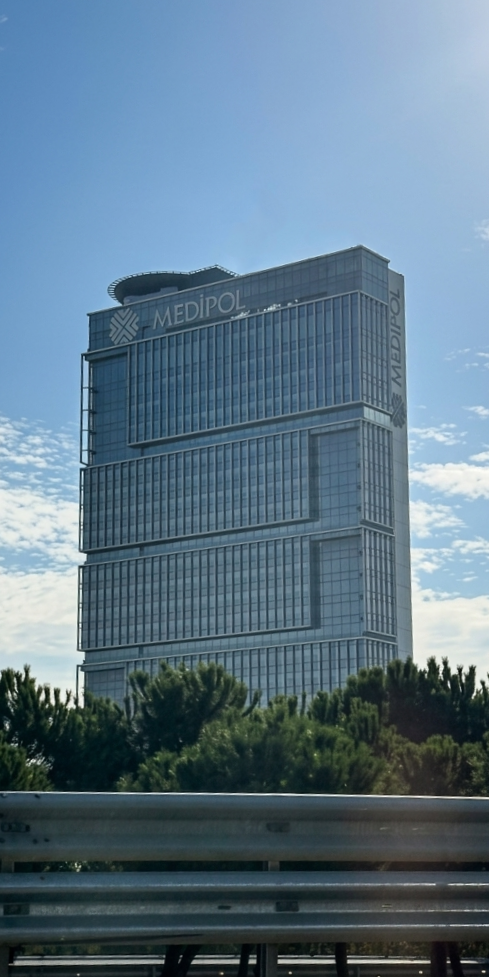
Medipol University Hospital Tower

=== Haliç Campus ===
includes the high school of health sciences and some bachelor majors like nursing, physiotherapy, and speech therapy.

== International rankings ==
University rankings

Global – Overall
- RUR World: 808 (2024)
- THE World: 801-1000 (2026)
- THE Young Universities: 401+ (2022)

Global – Life sciences and medicine
- THE Clinical and Health: 601-800 (2026)

In the Times Higher Education World University Rankings 2022, Istanbul Medipol University is ranked at 1201+ globally. In the broad subject areas, it is ranked 401+ in "Young Universities", 601+ in "Clinical, pre-clinical & health," and 401-500 in "Business & Economics." In the QS World University Rankings 2024, Istanbul Medipol University is ranked at 351-400 on EECA Rankings and 601+ in Europe University Rankings.The Best Global Universities Ranking 2023 of the U.S. News & World Report ranks Istanbul Medipol University 1886th in the world and 918th in "Clinical Medicine." By Round University Ranking 2022, Istanbul Medipol University is ranked 969th in the world. According to the U.S. News & World Report 2024 rankings, Istanbul Medipol University is ranked 786th in Clinical Medicine.

== Academic units ==
=== Faculties ===
- Faculty of Business and Management Sciences
- Faculty of Communication
- Faculty of Dentistry
- Faculty of Education
- Faculty of Engineering and Natural Sciences
- Faculty of Fine Arts, Design and Architecture
- Faculty of Health Sciences
- Faculty of Humanities and Social Sciences
- Faculty of Law
- Faculty of Medicine
- Faculty of Pharmacy
- International Faculty of Medicine

=== Graduate schools ===
- Graduate School of Health Sciences
- Graduate School of Forensic Sciences
- Graduate School of Engineering and Natural Sciences
- Graduate School of Social Sciences

== Library ==
Istanbul Medipol University has libraries located at its Kavacık North, Kavacık South, Haliç, and University Hospital campuses. As of 2025, the libraries house 95,461 printed books, 126 printed journals, 434 theses, 1,048,575 electronic books, 101,568 electronic journals, and 43 databases. Additionally, the library holds a rare collection of 38 books dating back to before 1950.

== See also ==
- List of universities in Turkey
- YÖK
