= Jülide Sarıeroğlu =

Turkish politician (born 1979)

Jülide Sarıeroğlu MP
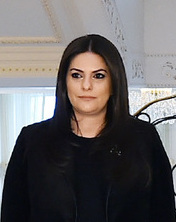

Minister of Labour and Social Security
- In office 19 July 2017 – 10 July 2018
- Prime Minister: Binali Yıldırım
- Preceded by: Mehmet Müezzinoğlu
- Succeeded by: Zehra Zümrüt Selçuk

Member of the Grand National Assembly
- Incumbent
- Assumed office 23 June 2015
- Constituency: Ankara (I) (June 2015, Nov 2015, 2023); Adana (2018)

Personal details
- Born: 7 June 1979 (age 47) Adana, Turkey
- Party: Justice and Development Party
- Education: Gazi University
- Profession: Labour economist, trade unionist, non-fiction writer, politician
- Cabinet: 65th

Jülide Sarıeroğlu (born 7 June 1979) is a Turkish labour economist, trade unionist, non-fiction writer and politician who served as the Minister of labour and social security from 19 July 2017 to 10 July 2018 in the Cabinet of Yıldırım.

== Early life ==
Jülide Sarıeroğlu was born to Şadi and his wife Kadriye in Adana, Turkey on 7 June 1979. She studied labour economics at the Faculty of Economics and Administrative Sciences of Gazi University in Ankara and graduated with a Bachelor's degree from the Department of Labour Economics and Industrial Relations. Currently, she continues her studies at the same department for a Master's degree.

== In politics ==
Sarıeroğlu joined the Justice and Development Party (AKP). She became a member of the Central Executive Committee's women's branch, and served as leader of some other committees in the party. She was alderman in the assembly of Çankaya municipality, chairperson of a trade union.

On 19 July 2017, she was appointed Minister of Labour and Social Security in the Second Cabinet of Binali Yıldırım. She is the second female government minister in the cabinet along with Fatma Betül Sayan Kaya, Minister of Family and Social Policy. Sarıeroğlu served at this post as a woman 26 years after İmren Aykut (in office 1987–1991).

She is the author of some practical books about working women rights, advantages of registered work, job search techniques, children's rights, and the examples of social dialogue in the EU countries.

== Works ==
1. Kadın Çalışmaları El Kitabı - Çalışan Kadınlar: Hakları ve Yeni Yasal Düzenlemeler
2. Kayıtlı Çalışmanın Avantajları
3. İş Arama Teknikleri
4. Çocuk Hakları,
5. AB Ülkelerinde Sosyal Diyalog Örnekleri

Political offices
Preceded by Mehmet Müezzinoğlu	Minister of Labour and Social Security; 19 July 2017 – 10 July 2018	Succeeded by Zehra Zümrüt Selçuk
