= Research university =

University committed to research

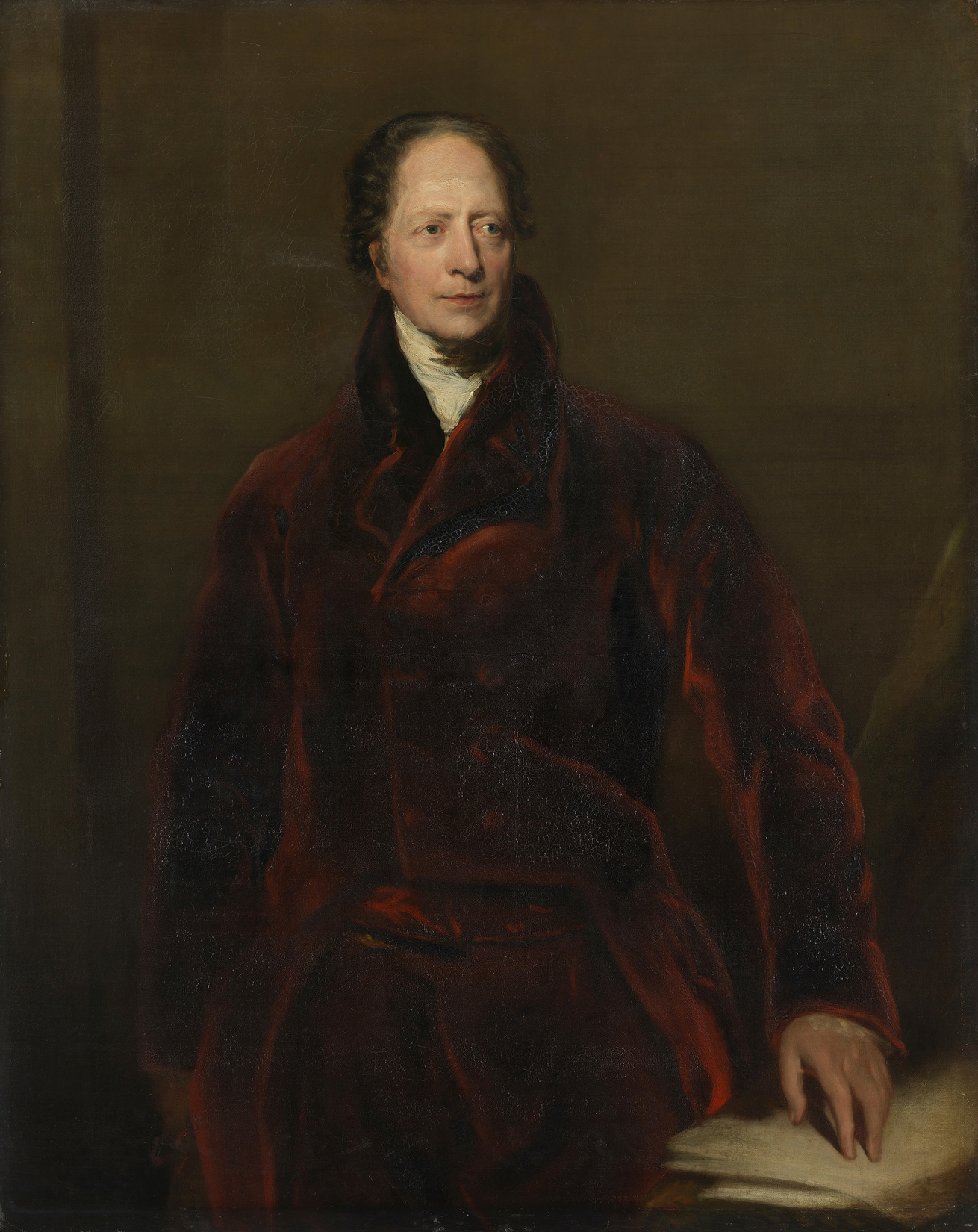
Wilhelm von Humboldt, credited with the Humboldtian model of higher education

A research university or a research-intensive university is a university that is committed to research and expansion of human knowledge as a central part of its mission. They are "the key sites of knowledge production", along with "intergenerational knowledge transfer and the certification of new knowledge" through the awarding of doctoral degrees, and continue to be "the very center of scientific productivity". They can be public or private, and often have well-known brand names.

Undergraduate courses at many research universities are often academic rather than vocational and may not prepare students for particular careers, but many employers value degrees from research universities because they teach fundamental life skills such as critical thinking. Globally, research universities are overwhelmingly public institutions, while some countries like the United States and Japan also have well-known private research institutions.

Institutions of higher education that are not research universities or do not aspire to that designation, such as liberal arts colleges, instead place more emphasis on student instruction or other aspects of tertiary education, whereas research university faculty members, in contrast, are under more pressure to publish or perish.

== History ==
=== 19th century ===
Johns Hopkins University in Baltimore, Maryland (Gilman Hall pictured), founded in 1876, is considered the first research university in the United States

The concept of the research university first arose in early 19th-century Prussia in Germany, where Wilhelm von Humboldt championed his vision of Einheit von Lehre und Forschung (the unity of teaching and research), as a means of producing an education that focused on the main areas of knowledge, including the natural sciences, social sciences, and humanities, rather than on the previous goals of the university education, which was to develop an understanding of truth, beauty, and goodness.

The concept was brought to Britain in the mid-19th century by Henry Enfield Roscoe, who had studied with Robert Wilhelm Bunsen at the University of Heidelberg. In 1857 he was appointed professor of chemistry at Owen's College, Manchester, and worked during the 1860s to develop the college following the German model. The emphasis on research from the German model was taken up by the other civic university colleges founded in England in the latter part of the 19th century. Research schools were founded by individual academics at some institutions from the 1870s, and from the 1890s research was pursued as a matter of institutional policy. British universities also set up research degrees in this period; however, these were higher doctorates, starting with the Doctor of Science at Durham in 1882 and Cambridge in 1883, aimed at a higher level than the PhD, or lower degrees such as Oxford's BPhil and BSc, Cambridge's BA by research, and the MA by dissertation at London and other newer universities.

Roger L. Geiger, "the leading historian of the American research university," has argued that "the model for the American research university was established by five of the nine colonial colleges chartered before the American Revolution (Harvard, Yale, Philadelphia, New Jersey, and King's); five state universities (Michigan, Wisconsin, Minnesota, Illinois, and California); and five private institutions conceived from their inception as research universities (MIT, Cornell, Johns Hopkins, Stanford, and Chicago)." The American research university first emerged in the late 19th century, when these fifteen institutions began to graft graduate programs derived from the German model onto undergraduate programs derived from the British model. At Johns Hopkins, president Daniel Coit Gilman led the development of the American research university by setting high standards for recruiting faculty and admitting students, and insisting that faculty members had to commit to both teaching and research.

=== 20th century ===
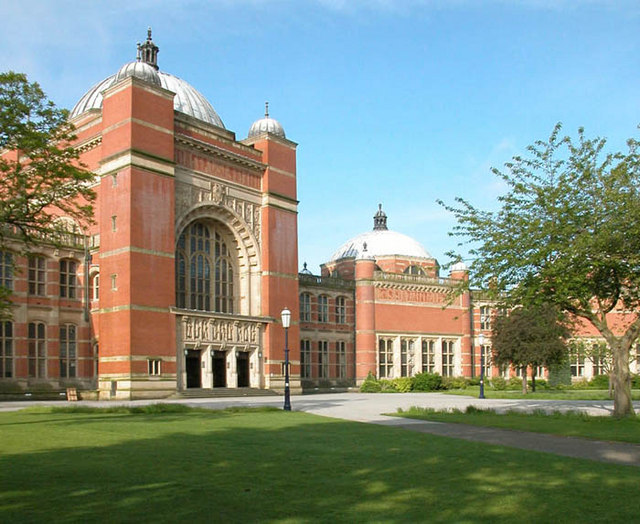
The University of Birmingham, UK, made vital research contributions during World War Two, including the Cavity magnetron that made airborne radar possible and the Frisch–Peierls memorandum that first demonstrated that an atomic bomb was technically feasible.

In the early 20th century, the tension between research-led teaching after Humboldt's model in the English civic university colleges and the centrally set examinations of the Victoria University and the University of London was one of the factors that contributed to the university colleges becoming universities in their own right.

Research universities were essential to the establishment of American hegemony by the end of the 20th century. Columbia and Harvard were instrumental in the early development of the American film industry in Hollywood in the first half of the 20th century.

The first Congress of Universities of the (British) Empire in 1912 was urged by the Foreign Office to adopt the PhD in order to prevent students going to study in Germany and America. However, this was opposed at that time as diluting the standard of English doctorates. In 1917, a conference of the universities of Birmingham, Leeds, Liverpool, Manchester and Sheffield decided to introduce the PhD, and this was followed by all British universities except Cambridge, which maintained its BA by research into the 1920s.

The development of nuclear weapons in the 1940s, culminating in the Manhattan Project, involved researchers from universities in the US (Berkeley, Chicago, Columbia, and Princeton) and the UK (Birmingham and Cambridge).

MIT and Stanford were leaders in building the American military–industrial complex in the aftermath of World War II. and developing artificial intelligence,

The first electronic stored-program computer, the Manchester Baby, was developed at Manchester in the 1940s, while in the US Berkeley and Stanford played a central role in the development of Silicon Valley. The "most prestigious group of research universities" in the United States is the Association of American Universities.

In the second half of the 20th century, American research universities became the model for research universities around the world. Having one or more universities based on the American model (including the use of English as a lingua franca) thus became a marker of "social progress and modernity" for countries.

=== 21st century ===
Research spending as a share of GDP by country

By the early 21st century it had become difficult for European universities to maintain research standards and resources at the level of the top US institutions.

Qatar and the United Arab Emirates (UAE) funded research universities to establish international branch campuses in those countries, and they and other Gulf states also started to build up their own research universities, such as Khalifa University (UAE), Hamad Bin Khalifa University (Qatar) and KAUST (Saudi Arabia), by recruiting Western-trained faculty and staff. By 2023, Qatar and the UAE had passed the US in number of papers published per 1000 population, although still behind Britain, Sweden and Singapore. As of April 2026, the UAE hosted 39 branch campuses, behind only China, with twelve institutions from the UK, seven from India, and three each from Australia, France, Russia and the US, while Qatar hosted twelve branch campuses, the majority from US institutions. The amount of funding given to US universities by Qatar led to concerns about Qatari involvement in US higher education.

Academic freedom – identified by Altbach as one of the key characteristics of successful research universities – declined globally from 2012, as measured by the Academic Freedom Index. The trend started in Latin America, the Middle East, Asia and North Africa, but spread to established liberal democracies. The US, in particular, saw a decline from 2020. Jeremy Berg noted that the dependence of research universities in the US on federal research funding gave the government leverage to override international autonomy, and that while some universities, such as Harvard, had pushed back and won in court, many had not.

== Characteristics ==
John Taylor, Professor of Higher Education Management at the University of Liverpool, defines the key characteristics of successful research universities as:

- "Presence of pure and applied research"
- "Delivery of research-led teaching"
- "Breadth of academic disciplines"
- "High proportion of postgraduate research programmes"
- "High levels of external income"
- "An international perspective"

Philip Altbach defines a different, although similar, set of key characteristics for what research universities need to become successful:

- At the top of the academic hierarchy in a differentiated higher education system and receiving appropriate support
- Overwhelmingly public institutions
- Little competition from non-university research institutions, unless these have strong connections to the universities
- More funding than other universities to attract the best staff and students and support research infrastructure
- Adequate and sustained budgets
- Potential for income generation from student fees and intellectual property
- Suitable facilities
- Autonomy
- Academic freedom

A 2012 National Academies of Sciences, Engineering, and Medicine report defined research universities, in the American context, as having values of intellectual freedom, initiative and creativity, excellence, and openness, with such additional characteristics as:

- Being large and comprehensive – Clark Kerr's "multiversity"
- Emphasizing the undergraduate residential experience (flagged specifically as distinguishing American research universities from those in continental Europe)
- Integrating graduate education with research
- Having faculty engaged in research and scholarship
- Conducting research at high levels
- Having enlightened and bold leadership

Global university rankings use metrics that primarily measure research to rank universities. Some also have criteria for inclusion based on the concept of a research university such as teaching at both undergraduate and postgraduate level and conducting work in multiple faculties (QS World University Rankings), or teaching undergraduates, having a research output of more than 1,000 research papers over 5 years, and no more than 80% of activity in a single subject area (Times Higher Education World University Rankings).

The Carnegie Classification of Institutions of Higher Education in the United States designates institutions that spend on average at least $2.5 million on research and development annually as 'research universities and colleges', with further designations of 'research 2: high spending and doctorate production' and 'research 1: very high spending and doctorate production' for institutions spending over $5 million and awarding 20 or more doctorates per year and institutions spending over $50 million and awarding 70 or more doctorates per year respectively. As of 2025, there were 187 R1 universities, 139 R2 universities and 216 other research universities in the US out of 3,941 total institutions classified.

== Worldwide distribution ==
The QS World University Ranking for 2021 included 1,002 research universities. The region with the highest number was Europe, with 39.8%, followed by Asia/Pacific with 26.7%, the US and Canada with 15.6%, Latin America with 10.8%, and the Middle East and Africa with 7%. All regions except the Middle East and Africa were represented in the top 100. The largest number of new entrants to the rankings were from East Asia and Eastern Europe, followed by Southern Europe. By individual country, the US had the most institutions with 151, followed by the UK with 84, China with 51 and Germany with 45. The top 200 showed a similar pattern with the US having 45 universities, the UK 26 and Germany 12. By comparison, the Carnegie Classification of Institutions of Higher Education (2015) identified 115 US universities as "Doctoral Universities: Highest Research Activity" and a further 107 as "Doctoral Universities: Higher Research Activity", while Altbach estimated that there were around 220 research universities in the US in 2013.

The Academic Ranking of World Universities for 2020 showed a similar distribution, with 185 of their 500 ranked institutions coming from Europe, 161 from the Americas, 149 from Asia/Oceania and five from Africa. All regions except Africa were represented in the top 100, although the Americas were represented solely by universities from the United States and Canada. In 2026, China had the most universities in the top 500, 125, followed by the US with 111, the UK with 35 and Germany with 35. However, the top 200 shows the different pattern: the US with 59 followed by China with 40 and the UK with 17.

The 2027 Times Higher Education only gave a breakdown by country and only for its top 200; this again had the US at the top with 53, followed by the UK with 25, Germany with 19 and China with 17. The top 200 featured one university from Africa, the University of Cape Town in South Africa, and one university from Latin America, the University of São Paulo in Brazil. The U.S. News & World Report Best Global Universities Ranking 2026 gave numbers by country for the 2250 universities ranked from more than 100 countries: China was the top, with 409, followed by the US with 275 and India with 123. However, the U.S. had 113 schools in the top 500, followed by China with 71 schools and the UK with 40. The 2025 CWTS Leiden Ranking included 1,594 universities in the rankings from 77 countries/regions: China topped the list, with 356, followed by the US with 204 and the UK with 61.

== See also ==
- History of European universities
- List of research universities in South Korea
- List of research universities in Turkey
- List of research universities in the United States
