= President of North Korea (disambiguation) =

President of North Korea was the title of North Korea's head of state from 1972 to 1994, officially translated as "President of the Democratic People's Republic of Korea". It can also refer to:

- Eternal President of the Republic, an honor bestowed on deceased President Kim Il-sung in 1998
- President of the Presidium of the Supreme People's Assembly (1998–2019), the presiding officer of the legislative standing committee and nominal head of state until 2009
- President of the State Affairs Commission, an office held by Kim Jong-un

== See also ==
- President of Korea (disambiguation)
