= Recep Akdağ =

Turkish physician and politician

Recep Akdağ MP
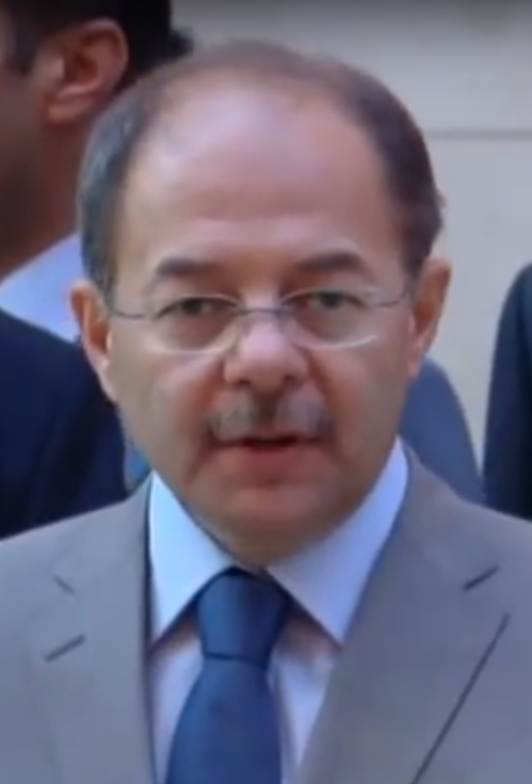

Deputy Prime Minister of Turkey
- In office 19 July 2017 – 9 July 2018
- Prime Minister: Binali Yıldırım
- Serving with: Mehmet Şimşek; Bekir Bozdağ; Hakan Çavuşoğlu; Fikri Işık
- Preceded by: Nurettin Canikli
- Succeeded by: office abolished

Minister of Health
- In office 24 May 2016 – 19 July 2017
- Prime Minister: Binali Yıldırım
- Preceded by: Mehmet Müezzinoğlu
- Succeeded by: Ahmet Demircan
- In office 18 November 2002 – 24 January 2013
- Prime Minister: Abdullah Gül; Recep Tayyip Erdoğan
- Preceded by: Osman Durmuş
- Succeeded by: Mehmet Müezzinoğlu

Member of the Grand National Assembly
- Incumbent
- Assumed office 1 November 2015
- Constituency: Erzurum (Nov 2015, 2018)
- In office 3 November 2002 – 7 June 2015
- Constituency: Erzurum (2002, 2007, 2011)

Personal details
- Born: 8 May 1960 (age 66) Erzurum, Turkey
- Party: Justice and Development Party
- Education: Medicine
- Alma mater: Atatürk University; King's College London

Recep Akdağ (born 8 May 1960) is a Turkish physician and politician who is a member of the Justice and Development Party. He was one of the last Deputy Prime Ministers of Turkey from 19 July 2017 to 9 July 2018 and served as Minister of Health from 2016 to 2017 and from 2002 to 2013.

== Life and career ==
Akdağ was born on 8 May 1960 in Erzurum, the son of Yahya Akdağ and his wife Zekiye. He completed his primary and secondary education in Erzurum, and his high school education in Ankara at Atatürk High School.

He graduated from Faculty of Medicine at Atatürk University in 1984, becoming a medical doctor and going on to an academic career in the field of medicine. He performed his obligatory service as a practitioner in Karabük for two years. In 1990, Akdağ became Child Health and Diseases Specialist in the Medical Faculty of the Atatürk University.

In September 1991, Akdağ commenced studies on molecular biology techniques and especially on polymerase chain reaction (PCR) at King's College London School of Medicine in London, United Kingdom. He completed his studies in November 1992, and returned to Turkey.

He initiated the studies of "Diagnosis of Tuberculosis with PCR through making contributions to the establishment of the first Molecular DNA laboratory in the Eastern Anatolia region through a research project" in line with these studies.

In 1992, he became an assistant professor in the Child Health and Diseases Main Branch of the Medical Faculty of Atatürk University. Akdağ received the title of associate professor in 1994, and the title of professor in 1999. He completed the "Gene Therapy" course successfully held at the Karolinska Institutet in Sweden in 1998.

Between 1994 and 1998, he worked as Deputy Chief Doctor, Procurement Commission Head and Deputy Editor of the Medical Bulletin in the Research Hospital of the Medical Faculty of Atatürk University. He was the Deputy Head of the Atatürk University's Biotechnological Implementation and Research Center between 1997 and 2000, a member of the Medical Faculty of Atatürk University-University of Pittsburgh Cooperation Committee between 1998 and 2000, a member of the Transfusion Committee between 1998 and 2002, a member of the Commission of Pharmaceuticals, a member of the Ethical Committee and head of the Pharmaceuticals Research Committee.

He is a founding member and board member of the Erzurum Branch of the National Pediatrics Association, a member of the Turkish Pediatric Hematology Association and a member of the Turkish Hematology Association.

He has about 100 scientific articles and announcements. About 20 of these are of international character. The number of attributions included in Citation Index is 16. He gave speeches and took part as chairman in various meetings and symposia.

He won the Prize of the Article of the Year from the Chamber of Doctors of İstanbul in 1996.

Recep Akdağ worked as a lecturer in pediatrics and deputy chief physician of Atatürk University's Research Hospital before being elected to parliament representing Erzurum on 3 November 2002.

On 18 November 2002, Akdağ was appointed Minister of Health. As well as the day-to-day running of the public health system, he has had to deal with a number of issues including:

- major reforms of the public health system to cut bureaucracy and increase efficiency, for example allowing public health patients to be treated privately at the state's expense, thus relieving the strain on state hospitals.
- bringing the cost of pharmaceuticals in Turkey down to EU norms
- the bird flu scare of 2006
- calls for a government initiative on birth control and family planning to bring average family size down to EU norms.

The purpose and duty of Ministry of Health is to make health services available, efficient, qualified and sustainable in every corner of the country.

On 24 January 2013, he was replaced by Mehmet Müezzinoğlu at his post in the cabinet.

== Personal life ==
Akdağ is married, has six children and speaks English.

Political offices
Preceded by Osman Durmuş	Minister of Health; 18 November 2002–24 January 2013	Succeeded by Mehmet Müezzinoğlu
Preceded by Mehmet Müezzinoğlu	Minister of Health; 24 May 2016–19 July 2017	Succeeded by Ahmet Demircan
