= Kulu, Konya =

Kulu
- District and municipality
- Logo

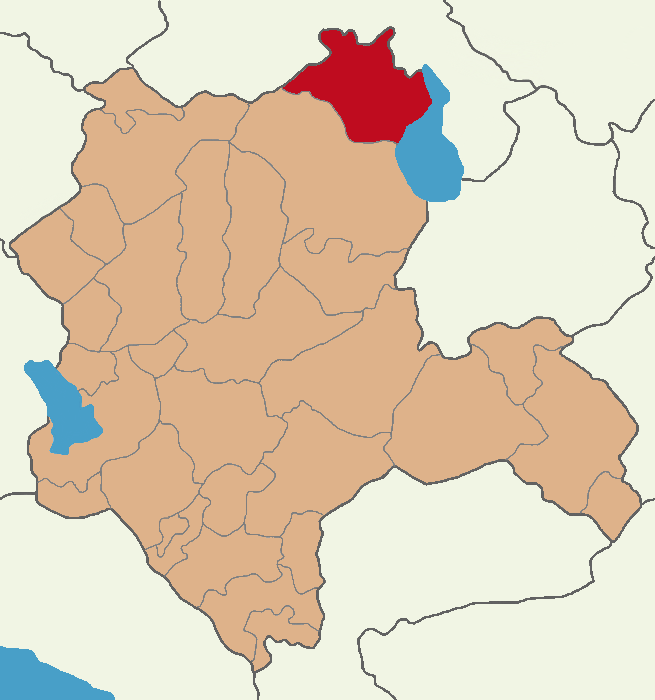
- Map showing Kulu District in Konya Province

- Location in Turkey Kulu (Turkey Central Anatolia)
- Coordinates: 39°05′21″N 33°04′50″E
- Country: Turkey
- Province: Konya

Government
  - Mayor: Murat Ünver (AKP)
- Area: 2,234 km^{2} (863 sq mi)
- Elevation: 968 m (3,176 ft)
- Population (2022): 51,612
  - Density: 23.10/km^{2} (59.84/sq mi)
- Time zone: UTC+3 (TRT)
- Area code: 0332
- Website: www.kulu.bel.tr

Kulu is a municipality and district of Konya Province, Turkey. Its area is 2,234 km^{2}, and its population is 51,612 (2022). Kulu is situated approximately 110 km from Ankara and 150 km from the city of Konya. With a substantial Swedish-Turkish community, not few of whom are from this region, Kulu hosts around 100,000 visitors from Europe in the summer. Swedish Prime Minister Fredrik Reinfeldt visited the city once.

== History ==
The modern Kulu district lies on the ancient Galatian city of Drya.

== Composition ==
There are 46 neighbourhoods in Kulu District:

- Acıkuyu
- Ağılbaşı
- Alparslan
- Altılar
- Arşıncı
- Bahadırlı
- Beşkardeş
- Bozan
- Burunağıl
- Camikebir
- Canımana
- Celep
- Cumhuriyet
- Değirmenözü
- Dinek
- Dipdede
- Doğutepe
- Fatih Sultan Mehmet
- Fevziye
- Gökler
- Güzelyayla
- Hisarköy
- Karacadağ
- Karacadere
- Karapınar
- Karşıyaka
- Kemaliye
- Kırkkuyu
- Kırkpınar
- Kömüşini
- Köşker
- Köstengil
- Kozanlı
- Ömeranlı
- Sarıyayla
- Şerefli
- Seyitahmetli
- Soğukkuyu
- Tavlıören
- Tuzyaka
- Yaraşlı
- Yazıçayırı
- Yenimahalle
- Yeşiltepe
- Yeşilyurt
- Zincirlikuyu

== Climate ==
Kulu has a semi-arid climate with hot and dry summers and cold and snowy winters.

Climate data for Kulu (1991–2020)
Month	Jan	Feb	Mar	Apr	May	Jun	Jul	Aug	Sep	Oct	Nov	Dec	Year
Mean daily maximum °C (°F)	3.5 (38.3)	6.2 (43.2)	11.7 (53.1)	17.0 (62.6)	22.3 (72.1)	27.0 (80.6)	30.9 (87.6)	30.9 (87.6)	26.5 (79.7)	20.0 (68.0)	11.8 (53.2)	5.4 (41.7)	17.8 (64.0)
Daily mean °C (°F)	−1.2 (29.8)	0.6 (33.1)	5.0 (41.0)	10.0 (50.0)	15.0 (59.0)	19.3 (66.7)	23.0 (73.4)	23.0 (73.4)	18.3 (64.9)	12.5 (54.5)	5.3 (41.5)	0.8 (33.4)	11.0 (51.8)
Mean daily minimum °C (°F)	−4.9 (23.2)	−4.0 (24.8)	−0.7 (30.7)	3.6 (38.5)	8.1 (46.6)	11.7 (53.1)	14.9 (58.8)	15.2 (59.4)	10.9 (51.6)	6.2 (43.2)	0.3 (32.5)	−2.8 (27.0)	4.9 (40.8)
Average precipitation mm (inches)	40.65 (1.60)	30.65 (1.21)	35.21 (1.39)	38.49 (1.52)	47.02 (1.85)	38.17 (1.50)	7.94 (0.31)	7.71 (0.30)	16.96 (0.67)	23.74 (0.93)	35.14 (1.38)	47.6 (1.87)	369.28 (14.54)
Average precipitation days (≥ 1.0 mm)	6.6	5.8	6.5	6.2	7.0	5.3	1.9	2.1	3.1	4.5	5.0	7.3	61.3
Average relative humidity (%)	80.5	74.6	65.5	61.5	59.2	54.0	45.4	45.6	51.0	61.3	72.6	81.4	62.6
Source: NOAA
