= Lütfi Kırdar =

Turkish politician

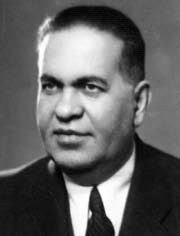

Minister of Health and Social Security
- In office November 26, 1957 – May 27, 1960
- Prime Minister: Adnan Menderes
- Preceded by: Nafiz Körez
- Succeeded by: Nusret Karasu

Ambassador of Turkey to Sweden
- In office 1949–1949
- President: İsmet İnönü

Governor and Mayor of Istanbul
- In office December 5, 1938 – October 20, 1949
- Preceded by: Muhittin Üstündağ
- Succeeded by: Fahrettin Kerim Gökay

Governor of Manisa
- In office 1936–1938
- Preceded by: Murat Germen
- Succeeded by: Osman Şahinbaş

Personal details
- Born: Mehmet Lütfi Kırdar; March 15, 1887 Kirkuk, Ottoman Empire
- Died: February 17, 1961 (aged 73) Yassıada, Istanbul, Turkey
- Citizenship: Turkish
- Party: Republican People's Party (1935–1951); Democrat Party (1951–1960)
- Children: 2
- Education: Istanbul University

Mehmet Lütfi Kırdar (March 15, 1887 – February 17, 1961) was a Turkish physician, civil servant, politician and Minister of Health and Social Security. He is best remembered for his long-term position as the Governor and Mayor of Istanbul.

== Early years and professional career ==
Lütfi Kırdar was born 1887 in his native city of Kirkuk (then the Ottoman Empire) to the prominent Turkmen Kirdar family. After finishing primary and secondary education in his hometown, he graduated from high school in Baghdad, Ottoman Empire. In 1908, he went to Istanbul to study medicine at Istanbul University.

He interrupted his university education and entered the army when the Balkan Wars (1912–1913) outbroke. After the war, he resumed his university education and graduated in 1917 as a physician. He began his profession in Najaf (today in Iraq). During World War I (1914-1918), he joined the army again.

After the World War I, he returned to medicine serving in the Turkish Red Crescent. Having met Mustafa Kemal Atatürk during the Erzurum Congress (1919), he subsequently participated at the Turkish War of Independence (1919–1923) as the leader of military medical service. For his contributions, he was later awarded with the Medal of Independence.

Following the proclamation of the Republic in 1923, Lütfi Kırdar conducted special studies on ophthalmology in Vienna, Austria and Munich, Germany. Returned home in 1924, he became Director of Health in İzmir. In 1933, Lütfi Kırdar took the post of an ophthalmologist at the State Hospital in İzmir.

== Politics ==
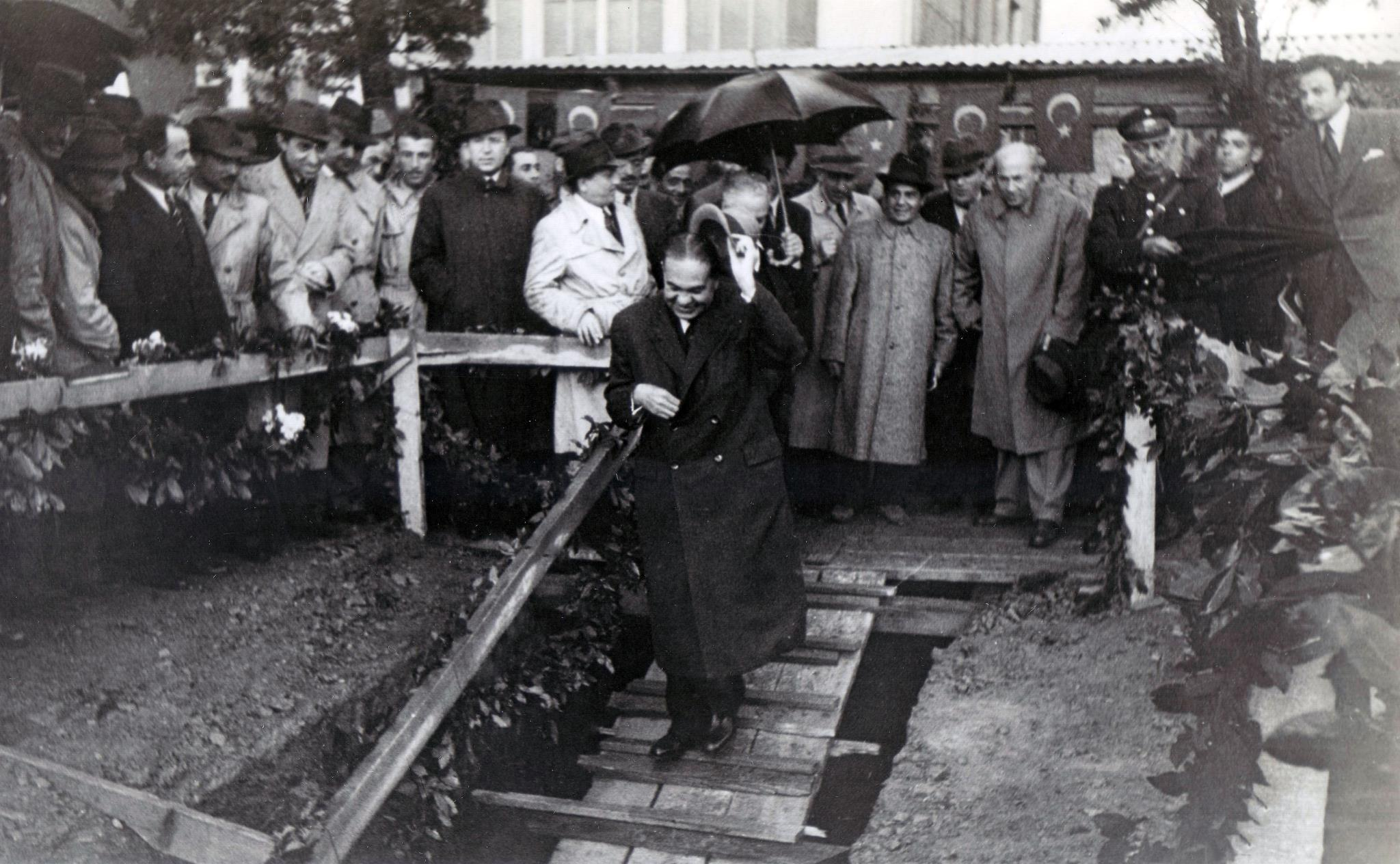
The groundbreaking ceremony of the Atatürk Kültür Merkezi (Atatürk Cultural Center)

Kırdar was elected deputy of Kütahya from the Republican People's Party in 1935. In 1936, he was appointed Governor of Manisa Province. On December 5, 1938, Lütfi Kırdar became Governor and Mayor of Istanbul Province, serving at this post twelve years long until October 20, 1949.

During his term as governor and mayor, important buildings were constructed in Istanbul, among them Sport and Exhibition Center (renamed later Istanbul Lütfi Kırdar Convention and Exhibition Center), Cemil Topuzlu Open-Air Theatre, Mithat Pasha Stadium (renamed later BJK İnönü Stadium), Taksim Square and Atatürk Boulevard, which connects Golden Horn with Aksaray in Fatih district.

In 1949, Lütfi Kırdar was appointed Ambassador to Stockholm in Sweden. In December the same year, he became deputy of Manisa from the Republican People's Party (CHP) in the intermediate election. However, he lost his chair in the parliament in the 1950 general election.

Switched over to the Democrat Party (DP), he was re-elected in the 1954 general election as deputy of Istanbul, and again in the 1957 general election.

Prime minister Adnan Menderes appointed Lütfi Kırdar Minister of Health and Social Security on November 26, 1957. He served in the cabinet until May 27, 1960 when military overtook the government by the 1960 Turkish coup d'état.

He was arrested along with all other government ministers and brought before military tribunal on Yassıada, an island in Marmara Sea. He died of myocardial infarction during his defense in the court on February 17, 1961. Two days later, he was laid to rest at the Zincirlikuyu Cemetery. He is survived by his two sons Erdem and Üner.

Political offices
Preceded by Muhittin Üstündağ	Governor and Mayor of İstanbul; December 5, 1938–October 20, 1949	Succeeded by Fahrettin Kerim Gökay
Preceded by Nafiz Körez	Minister of Health and Social Security; November 26, 1957–May 27, 1960	Succeeded by Nusret Karasu
