= Ahmet Demircan =

Turkish physician and politician

Minister of Health
- In office 19 July 2017 – 9 July 2018
- Prime Minister: Binali Yıldırım
- Preceded by: Recep Akdağ
- Succeeded by: Fahrettin Koca

Personal details
- Born: 13 July 1954 (age 71) Samsun, Turkey
- Party: Welfare Party (1995–1998); Virtue Party (1998–2002); People's Voice Party (2010–2012); Justice and Development Party (2012–present)
- Education: Medicine
- Alma mater: Atatürk University

Ahmet Demircan (born 13 July 1954) is a Turkish physician and politician. He served as the Minister of Health between 2017 and 2018.

Demircan is a graduate from Atatürk University's Faculty of Medicine. He specialized in General Surgery at the same faculty. He worked as practitioner at the state hospitals of Samsun, Muş and Bafra. He was a deputy for Samsun in the 20th, 21st, 25th, 26th and 27th Parliamentary period. He was a Ministry of State in the 54th government of Turkey.

Demircan served as deputy chairmen of the People's Voice Party. He was appointed to the Ministry of Health due to the changes made in the cabinet on 19 July 2017.

Political offices
Preceded by Recep Akdağ	Minister of Health; 19 July 2017–9 July 2018	Succeeded by Fahrettin Koca
