= Third inauguration of Recep Tayyip Erdoğan =

Presidential inauguration of Recep Tayyip Erdoğan

Presidential inauguration of Recep Tayyip Erdoğan
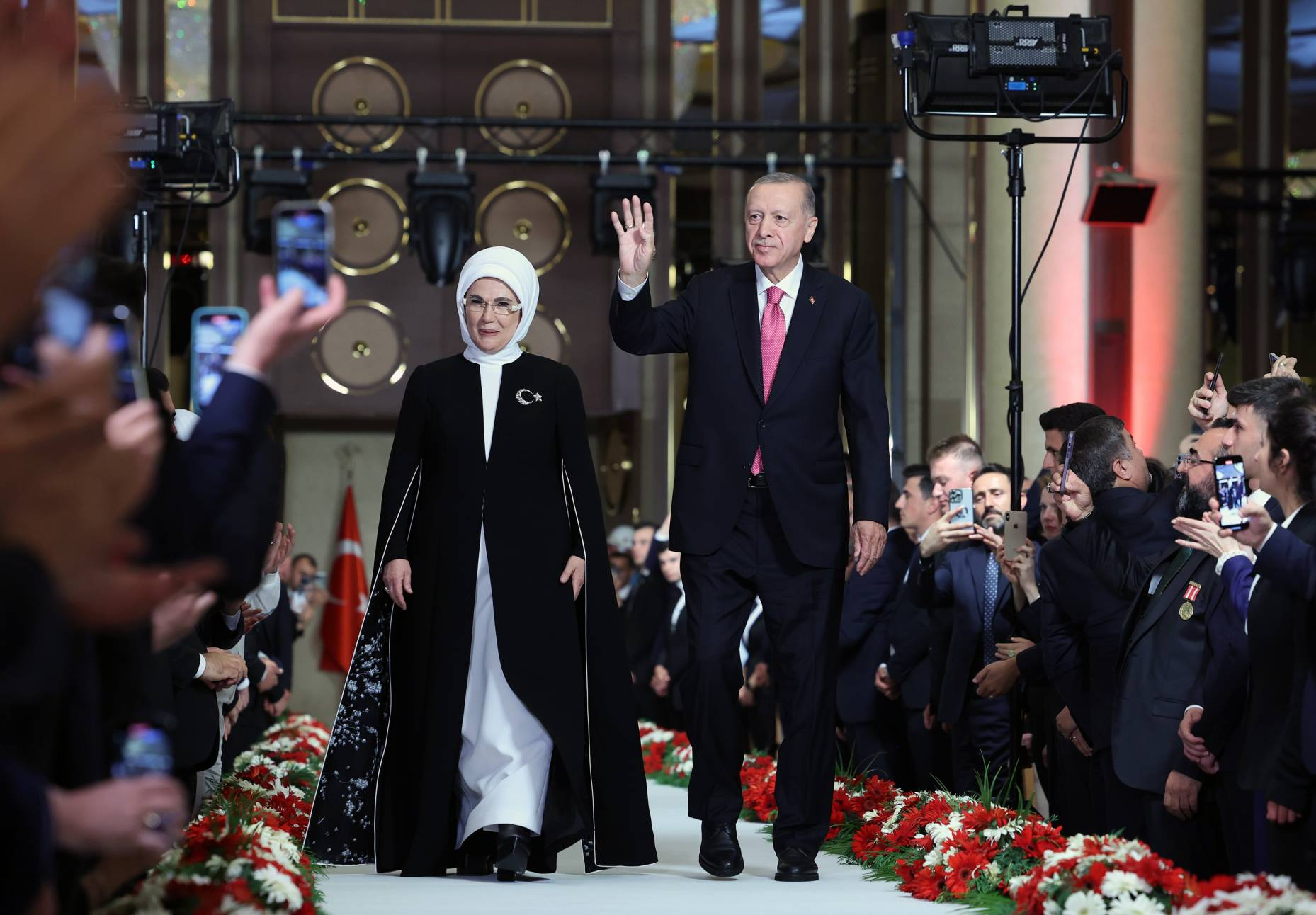
- Recep Tayyip Erdoğan after being sworn-in as the president of Turkey.
- Date: 3 June 2023; 3 years ago
- Location: Presidential Complex, Ankara
- Participants: Recep Tayyip Erdoğan; 12th president of Turkey — Assuming office Devlet Bahçeli; Speaker of the Grand National Assembly — Administering oath

The third inauguration of Recep Tayyip Erdoğan as the president of Turkey took place on Saturday, 3 June 2023, at the Presidential Complex in Ankara.

== Background ==
Erdoğan won 52.2 percent of the votes in the presidential runoff on May 28 against his rival Kemal Kılıçdaroğlu, the leader of the center-left Republican People's Party.

== Pre-inaugural events ==
=== Oath of office ===
Turkish President Erdoğan was welcomed with an official ceremony at the Grand National Assembly. Red carnations were thrown on his state car. Interim Speaker Devlet Bahçeli handed over the certificate of election. Erdoğan took the oath of office for a new five-year presidential term at the Grand National Assembly.

"I, as president, swear upon my honour and integrity before the great Turkish nation and history to safeguard the existence and independence of the state ... to abide by the constitution, the rule of law, democracy, the principles and reforms of Ataturk, and the principles of the secular republic," Erdogan said in a ceremony at the parliament in Ankara, which was broadcast live on television.

=== Visit to the mausoleum of Atatürk ===
President Erdoğan made a visit to Anıtkabir, the final resting place of Mustafa Kemal Atatürk, the founder of the Republic of Turkey.

== Inaugural events ==
Upon the president's arrival at the Presidential Complex, soldiers fired a 101-gun salute as he entered the presidential complex. In addition, 101-gun salutes were also fired at the army headquarters of the Air, Land and Naval Forces Commands. Erdogan's motorcade was joined by a cavalry unit.

The Presidential Symphony Orchestra, the Presidential Classical Turkish Music Choir, the Turkish Armed Forces Harmonica were present at the ceremony. The Turkish Armed Forces Mehteran Unit and the Turkish Armed Forces Historical Unit was also present at the ceremony with their local costumes.

Supporters in parliament gave Erdogan a minute-long standing ovation after his swearing in, while some opposition lawmakers refused to stand up.

=== Inaugural address ===
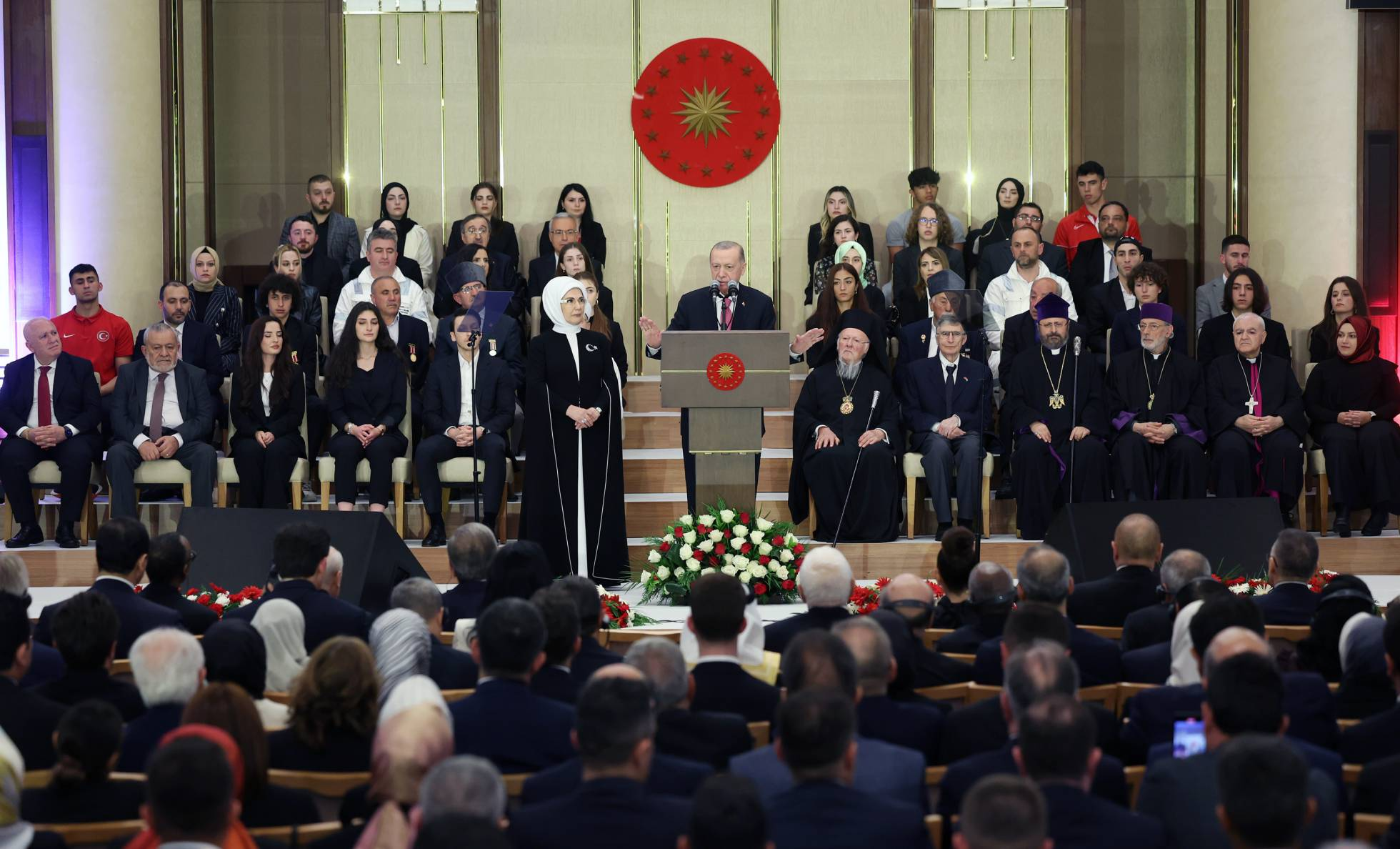
President Erdogan addressing the guests

In his inauguration speech at the presidential complex, Erdogan said that the current constitution was a product of the 1980 coup and that it needed to be replaced with "a libertarian, civil and inclusive one" that would strengthen democracy.

=== Luncheon ===
The Erdoğans joined several guests for the inaugural luncheon in the Çankaya Mansion. Guests included foreign presidents as well as famous people such as Nobel laureate Aziz Sancar and football player Mesut Özil.

==== Foreign attendance ====
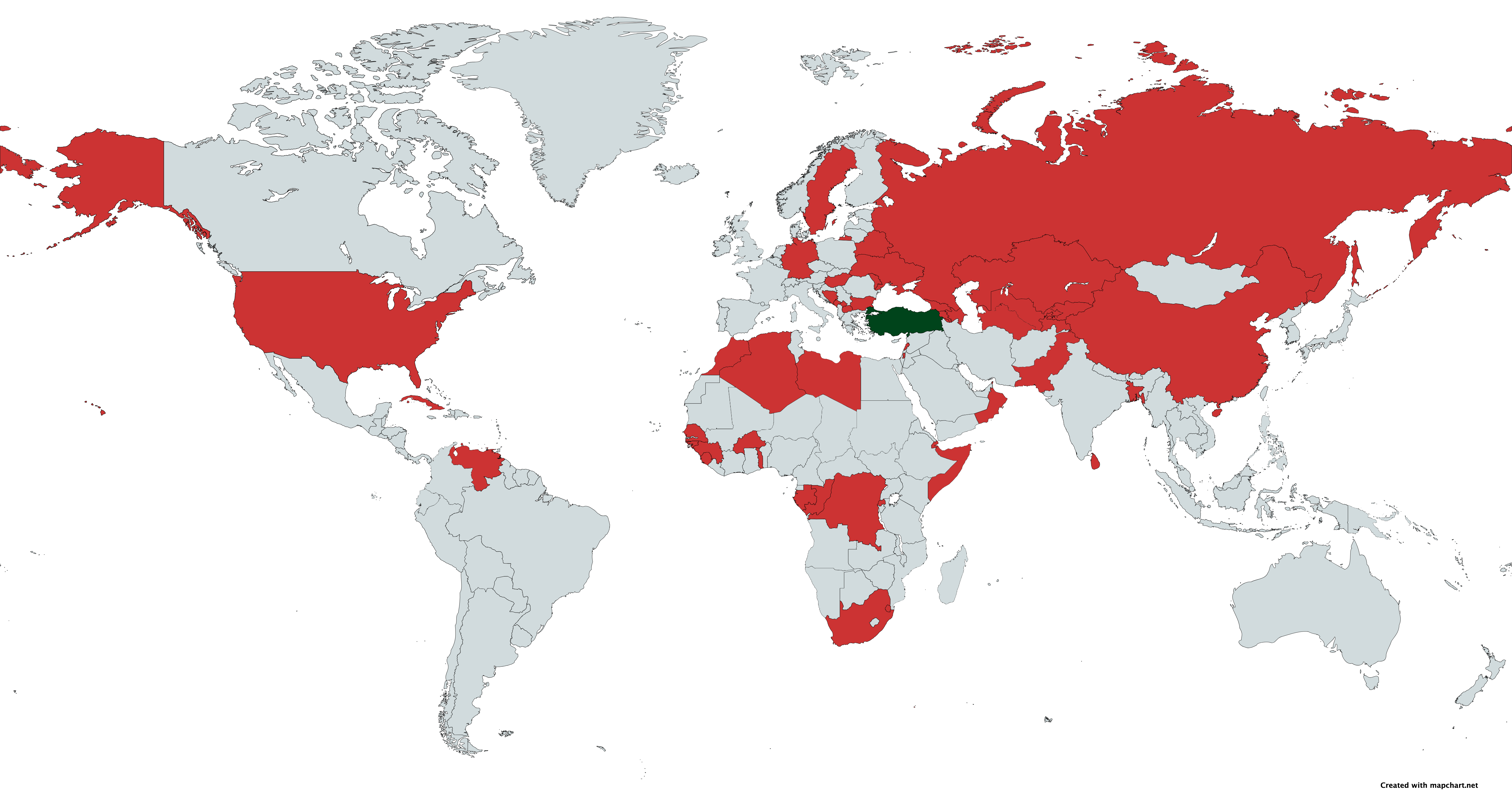

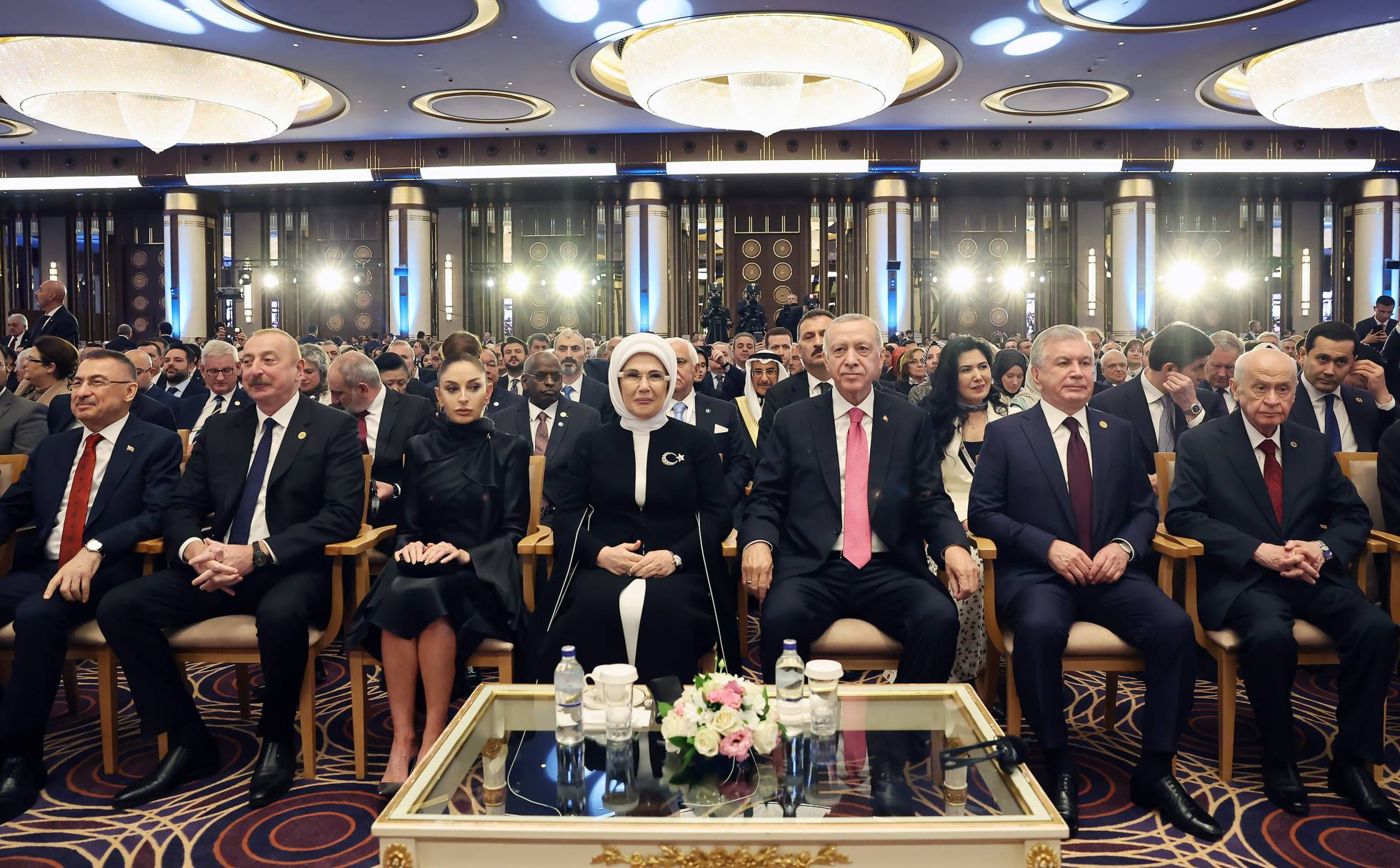
Erdoğan, Azerbaijan's President Ilham Aliyev, Armenia's Prime Minister Nikol Pashinyan and Uzbekistan's Prezident Shavkat Mirziyoyev

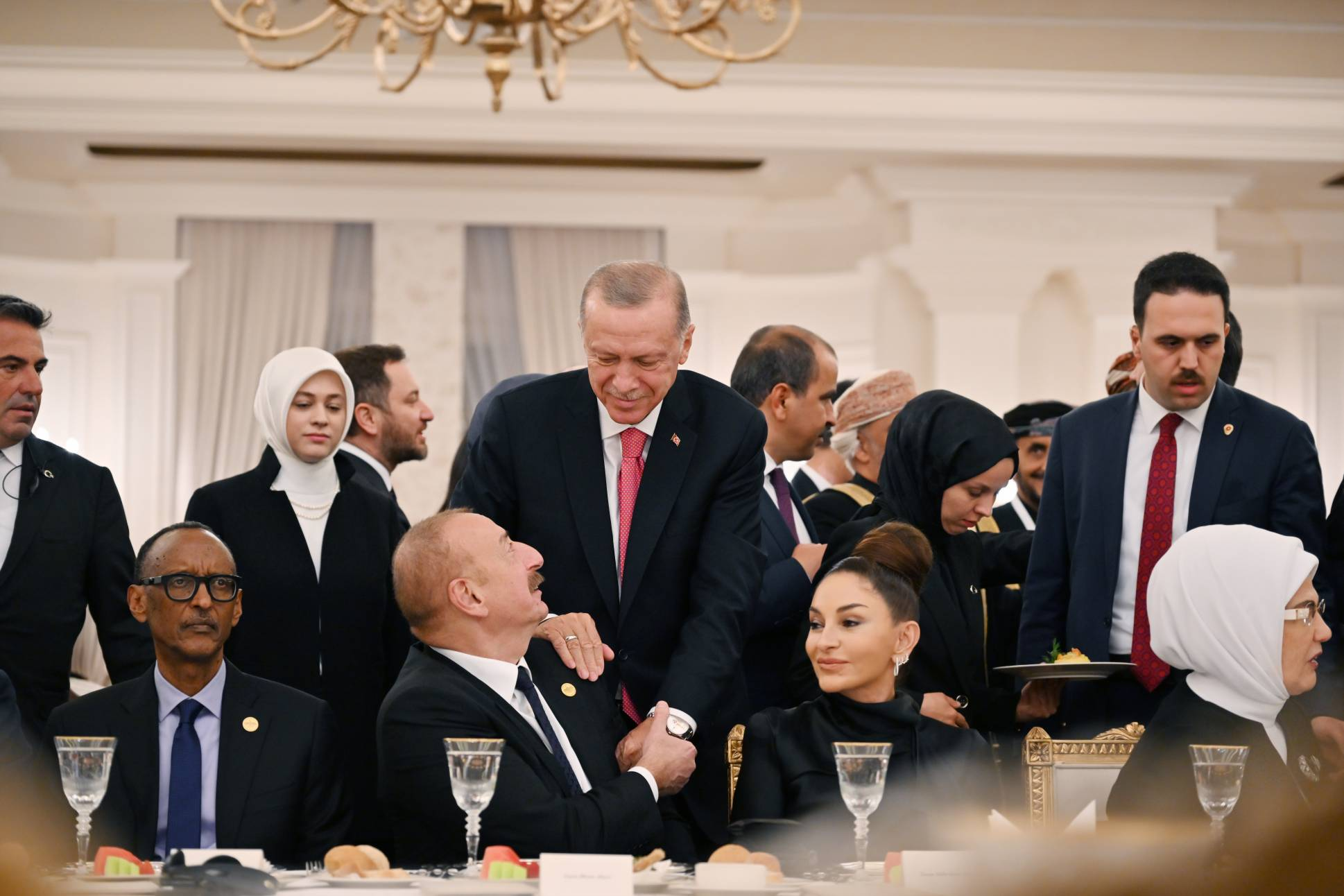
Ilham Aliyev and First Lady Mehriban Aliyeva attend a dinner hosted on behalf of President Erdoğan in Ankara

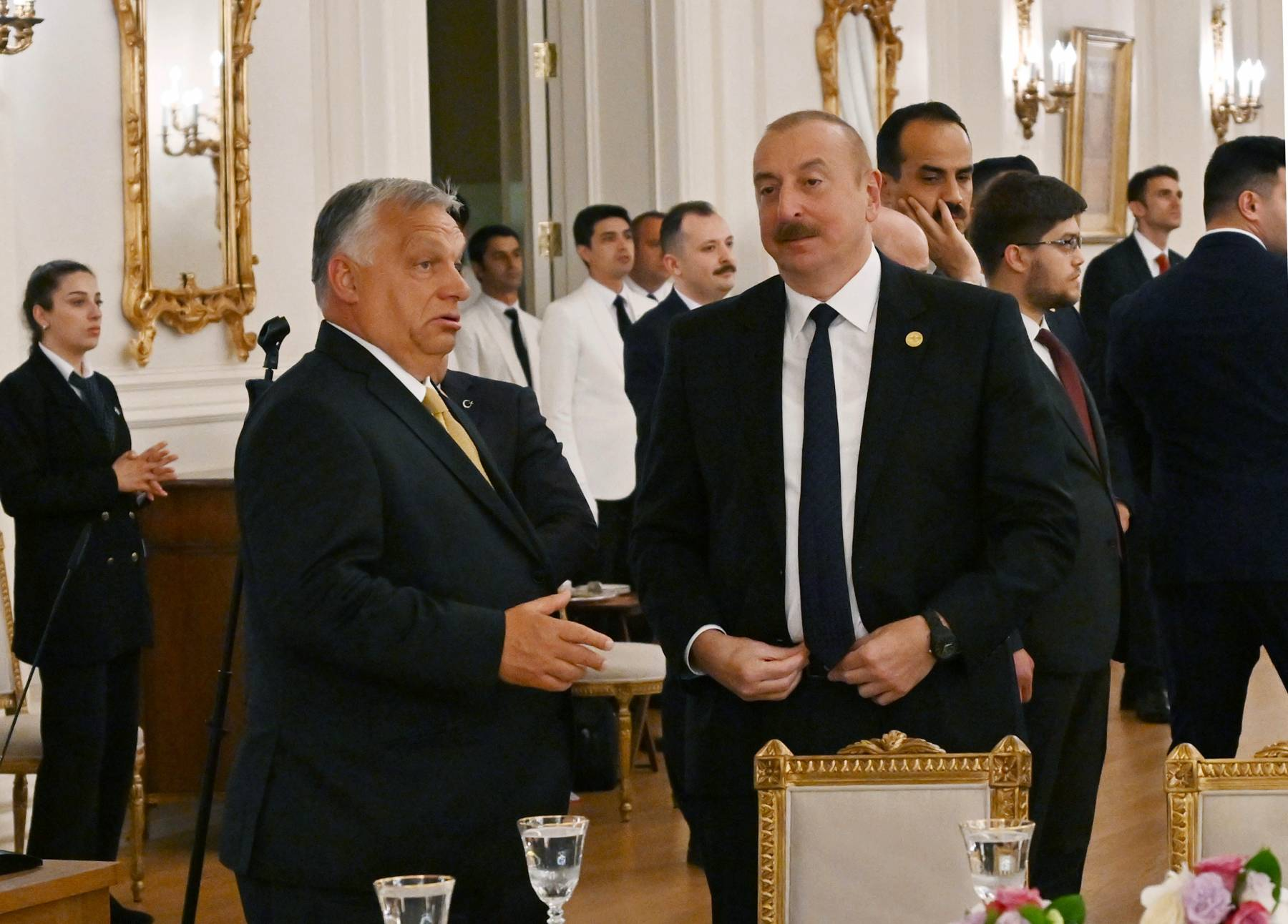
Ilham Aliyev and Hungarian Prime Minister Viktor Orbán

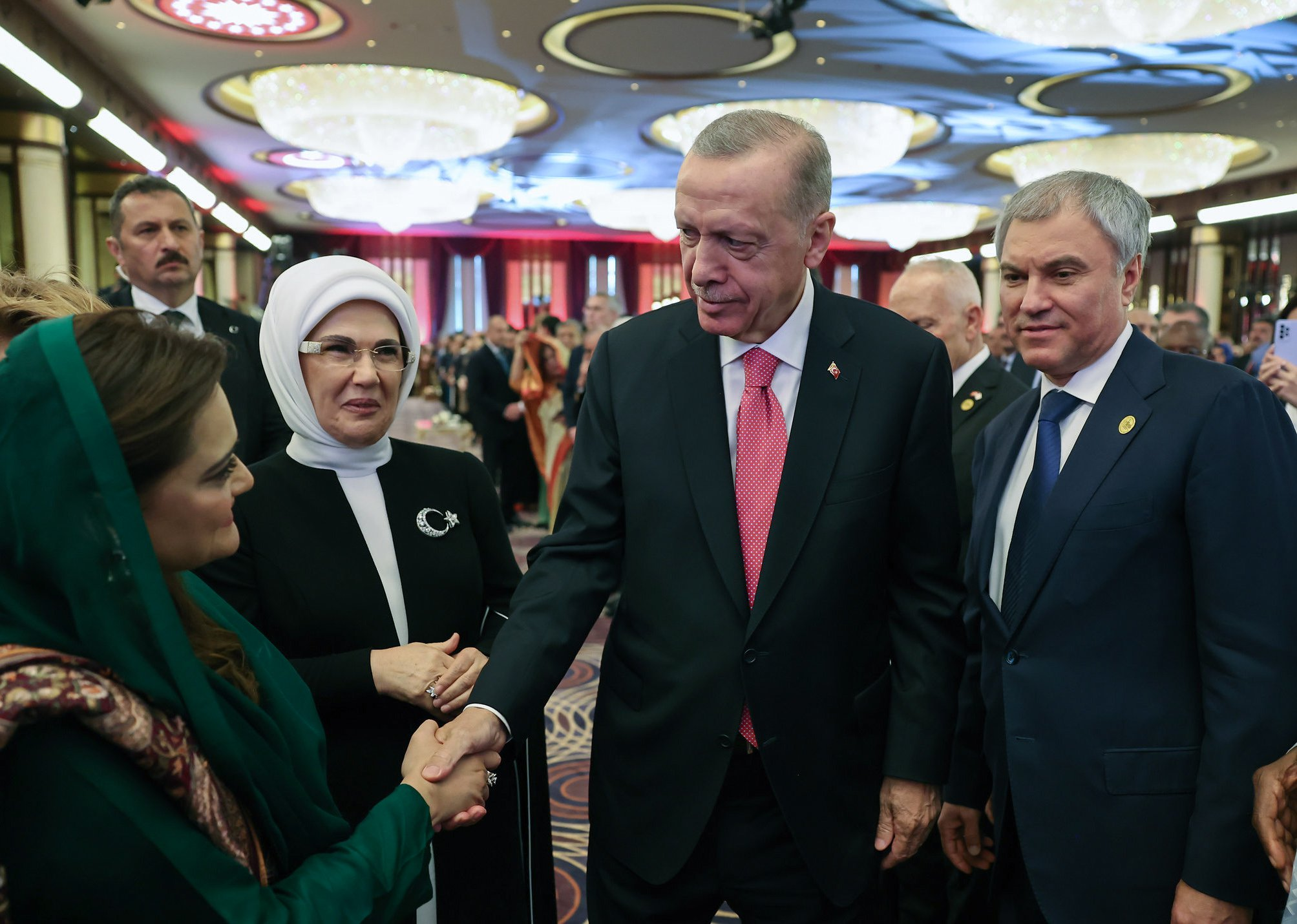
State Duma Speaker Vyacheslav Volodin represented Russia at the inauguration ceremony

Erdoğan's third inauguration was attended by dozens of foreign dignitaries.

- Algeria: Chairman Salah Goudjil
- Armenia: Prime Minister Nikol Pashinyan
- Azerbaijan: President Ilham Aliyev
- Bangladesh: President Mohammed Shahabuddin
- Belarus: Speaker Vladimir Andreichenko
- Bosnia and Herzegovina: Chairwoman of the Presidency Željka Cvijanović
- Bulgaria: President Rumen Radev
- Burkina Faso: Speaker Ousmane Bougouma
- China: Vice Chairman Ding Zhongli
- Congo: President Denis Sassou Nguesso
- Democratic Republic of the Congo: Prime Minister Sama Lukonde
- Cuba: Prime Minister Manuel Marrero Cruz
- Djibouti: Prime Minister Abdoulkader Kamil Mohamed
- Eswatini: Prime Minister Cleopas Dlamini
- Gabon: President Ali Bongo Ondimba
- Georgia: Prime Minister Irakli Garibashvili
- Germany: Former President Christian Wulff and former Chancellor Gerhard Schröder
- Guinea: President Mamady Doumbouya
- Guinea Bissau: President Umaro Sissoco Embalo
- Hungary: Prime Minister Viktor Orban
- Kazakhstan: President Kassym-Jomart Tokayev
- Kosovo: President Vjosa Osmani
- Kurdistan: President Nechirvan Barzani
- Kyrgyzstan: President Sadyr Japarov
- Lebanon: Prime Minister Najib Mikati
- Libya: Prime Minister Abdul Hamid Dbeibeh
- Maldives: Vice President Faisal Naseem
- Moldova: Prime Minister Dorin Recean
- Montenegro: President Jakov Milatović
- Morocco: Chairman Rachid Talbi Alami
- Northern Cyprus: President Ersin Tatar
- North Macedonia: President Stevo Pendarovski
- Oman: Chairman Yahya bin Mahfoudh al-Mantheri
- Pakistan: Prime Minister Shahbaz Sharif
- Palestine: Speaker Aziz Dweik
- Russia: Chairman Vyacheslav Volodin
- Rwanda: President Paul Kagame
- Senegal: President Macky Sall
- Sierra Leone: Speaker Abass Bundu
- Somalia: President Hassan Sheikh Mohamud
- South Africa: President Cyril Ramaphosa
- Sri Lanka: Speaker Mahinda Yapa Abeywardena
- Sweden: Former Prime Minister Carl Bildt
- Tajikistan: Prime Minister Kokhir Rasulzoda
- Togo: President Faure Essozimna Gnassingbe
- Turkmenistan: President Serdar Berdimuhamedow
- Ukraine: Chairman Ruslan Stefanchuk
- United States of America: Ambassador Jeff Flake
- Uzbekistan: President Shavkat Mirziyoyev
- Venezuela: President Nicolas Maduro

International organizations officials

- NATO Secretary General Jens Stoltenberg
- Organization of Turkic States Secretary General Kubanychbek Omuraliev
- Organization of Islamic Cooperation Secretary General Hissein Brahim Taha
- European Commission Vice President Valdis Dombrovskis
- Gulf Cooperation Council executive
- Black Sea Economic Cooperation Organization executive.

== Post-inaugural events ==
Following the ceremony, President Erdoğan announced the ministers of the 67th cabinet of Turkey.

== See also ==
- Presidency of Recep Tayyip Erdoğan
