= Fahrettin Kerim Gökay =

Turkish politician (1900–1987)

Ord. Prof. Dr. Fahrettin Kerim Gökay
- Gökay in 1966

Minister of Health and Social Security
- In office November 27, 1963 – December 25, 1963
- Prime Minister: İsmet İnönü
- Preceded by: Yusuf Azizoğlu
- Succeeded by: Kemal Demir

Minister of Construction and Settlement
- In office July 1962 – November 27, 1963
- Prime Minister: İsmet İnönü

Ambassador of Turkey to Switzerland
- In office November 23, 1957 – July 2, 1960
- President: Celal Bayar
- Preceded by: Faik Zihni Akdur
- Succeeded by: Zeki Kuneralp

Governor and Mayor of Istanbul
- In office October 24, 1949 – November 26, 1957
- Preceded by: Lütfi Kırdar
- Succeeded by: Mümtaz Tarhan

Personal details
- Born: January 9, 1900 Eskişehir, Ottoman Empire
- Died: July 22, 1987 (aged 87) Istanbul, Turkey
- Citizenship: Turkish
- Party: New Turkey Party (1961) (YTP)
- Education: Medicine
- Alma mater: Istanbul University

Fahrettin Kerim Gökay (January 9, 1900 – July 22, 1987) was a Turkish politician, civil servant, professor ordinarius and physician. He served as government minister, and is well known for his long-term position as governor of Istanbul.

== Early years ==
He was born on January 9, 1900, in Eskişehir. His father was Hajji Kerim Efendi, a Crimean Tatar from Kerch and his mother Hajji Azize Hanım, an immigrant daughter from Dobruja. After finishing the primary school in his hometown, he studied in a high school in Istanbul.

Gökay was educated at Istanbul University's Faculty of Medicine, from where he graduated as a physician in 1922. He then carried out studies between 1922 and 1924 at the Ludwig-Maximilians-Universität München and the University of Hamburg in Germany as well as at the University of Vienna, Austria, specializing in neuropathy.

In 1926, Gökay became associate professor, in 1933 professor and then in 1942 full professor. He served also as president of the Turkish Red Crescent.

== Civil servant ==
On October 24, 1949, he was appointed governor and mayor of Istanbul, succeeding Lütfi Kırdar (in office 1938–1949). Gökay served in this post until November 26, 1957. He introduced price controls on staple foods in Istanbul to protect low-income residents. The municipality of Istanbul founded Migros Türk in 1954 as a joint venture with Swiss Migros, initially operating (like its counterpart in Switzerland) via sales trucks. Gökay opened up the area outside the Walls of Istanbul for urbanization. He also initiated the foundation of around fifty schools in Istanbul. During his term of office, he was nicknamed "Küçük Vali" (literally English: Little Governor) for his small height, and was a favorite figure depicted in cartoons as such. He was blamed for his passive behavior during the Istanbul riots on September 6–7 in 1955, and was tried before the military tribunal on Yassıada after the 1960 coup d'état.

On November 23, 1957, he was appointed Ambassador to Switzerland, where he served in Bern until July 2, 1960.

== Politician ==
In the 1961 general election, Gökay entered politics, running for a seat in the parliament from the New Turkey Party and became deputy of Istanbul. In the cabinet of İsmet İnönü, Gökay served as Minister of Construction and Settlement from July 1962, and then as minister of health and social security between November 27 and December 25, 1963. He retired from politics in 1965.

Gökay died on July 22, 1987, at the age of 87 in Istanbul.

== Legacy ==
A main street in Kadıköy district of Istanbul is named after him. There is an Anatolian High School at Sefaköy in Küçükçekmece district of Istanbul bearing his name.

Political offices
Preceded by Lütfi Kırdar	Governor and Mayor of İstanbul; October 24, 1949–November 26, 1957	Succeeded by Mümtaz Tarhan
Preceded by	Minister of Construction and Settlement; July 1962–November 27, 1963	Succeeded by
Preceded by Yusuf Azizoğlu	Minister of Health and Social Security; November 27, 1963–December 25, 1963	Succeeded by Kemal Demir
