= Vefa Tanır =

Turkish politician (1927–2023)

Vefa Tanır (1927 – 10 March 2023) was a Turkish politician who served as minister of health and social assistance, minister of public works, minister of forestry, and minister of national defense.
