= President of Korea =

President of Korea may refer to:

- President of South Korea
- President of the Constitutional Court of Korea (South Korea)
- President of North Korea (disambiguation)
  - President of North Korea
  - President of the State Affairs Commission
  - President of the Presidium of the Supreme People's Assembly
  - Eternal President of the Republic
