= Mehmet Müezzinoğlu =

Turkish politician (born 1955)

Mehmet Müezzinoğlu MP
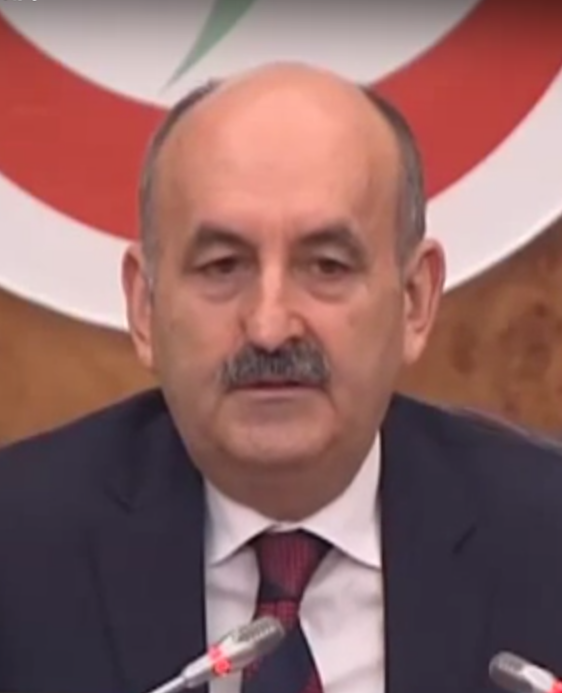

Minister of Labour and Social Security
- In office 31 August 2016 – 19 July 2017
- Prime Minister: Binali Yıldırım
- Preceded by: Süleyman Soylu
- Succeeded by: Jülide Sarıeroğlu

Minister of Health
- In office 24 January 2013 – 24 May 2016
- Prime Minister: Recep Tayyip Erdoğan; Ahmet Davutoğlu
- Preceded by: Recep Akdağ
- Succeeded by: Recep Akdağ

Member of the Grand National Assembly
- In office 22 July 2007 – 7 July 2018
- Constituency: İstanbul (III) (2007); Edirne (2011); Bursa (June 2015, Nov 2015)

Personal details
- Born: 9 January 1955 (age 71) Arriana, Greece
- Party: Welfare Party (Before 1997); Virtue Party (1997–2001); Justice and Development Party (2001–present)
- Education: Istanbul University
- Cabinet: 61st, 62nd, 63rd, 64th, 65th

Mehmet Müezzinoğlu (born January 9, 1955) is a Turkish physician and politician, who served as the Minister of Labour and Social Security between 2016 and 2017, and the Minister of Health from 2013 to 2016.

== Early years ==
He was born on January 9, 1955, in Arriana village of Rhodope to Ali and his wife Fatma, a family from the Turkish minority in Greece. Müezzinoğlu went to Istanbul for his high school education. He studied in an İmam Hatip school, where he met Recep Tayyip Erdoğan, who was his classmate.

In 1983, Müezzinoğlu immigrated from Greece illegally by crossing the river Maritsa (Turkish: Meriç). Before acquiring Turkish citizenship in 1986, he lived in Turkey as a heimatlos between 1983 and 1986.

Müezzinoğlu completed his medical specialisation in internal medicine at Haseki Hospital in 1986 after graduating from Cerrahpaşa Medicine Faculty of Istanbul University in 1982.

Before entering politics, he worked as a physician in a private hospital he co-founded in Avcılar district of Istanbul Province. In his social life, he is a member of various associations and foundations related to Western Thrace Turks.

== Politics ==
Müezzinoğlu became a member of the Islamist Welfare Party (Turkish: Refah Partisi, RP) in 1992, where he helped to make policy alongside Recep Tayyip Erdoğan. Between 2002 and 2007, he served as the chairman of the Justice and Development Party's Istanbul Province organization.

He was elected as member of parliament for Istanbul Province in the 2007 general election. He was reelected to the parliament in the 2011 general election, this time as deputy for Edirne. On January 24, 2013, Mehmet Müezzinoğlu was appointed as Minister of Health in the cabinet of Recep Tayyip Erdoğan, replacing Recep Akdağ. He kept his post in three successive cabinets of Ahmet Davutoğlu. On 24 May 2016, the Third Davutoğlu Cabinet was dissolved, and Müezzinoğlu's term as Health Minister ended. On 31 August 2016, he was appointed Minister of Labour and Social Security in the Cabinet of Yıldırım replacing Süleyman Soylu. During a cabinet reshuffle on 19 July 2017, his term ended, and he was succeeded by Jülide Sarıeroğlu.

== During the 2013 protests ==
During the 2013 protests in Turkey, several makeshift infirmaries were erected to treat victims of the violence. The injuries included trauma from plastic bullets and teargas canisters. In response to this, Müezzinoğlu declared that "[t]he infirmaries around the protest areas are illegal. This is ideologic and it's an execution violating the legal structure. There will be legal action taken against the medics working in those infirmaries."

== Family life ==
Mehmet Müezzinoğlu is married and has two children.

Political offices
Preceded by Recep Akdağ	Minister of Health; 24 January 2013 – 24 May 2016	Succeeded by Recep Akdağ
Preceded by Süleyman Soylu	Minister of Labour and Social Security; 31 August 2016 – 19 July 2017	Succeeded by Jülide Sarıeroğlu
