= Ministry of Health (Turkey) =

Government ministry of Turkey

- Sağlık Bakanlığı
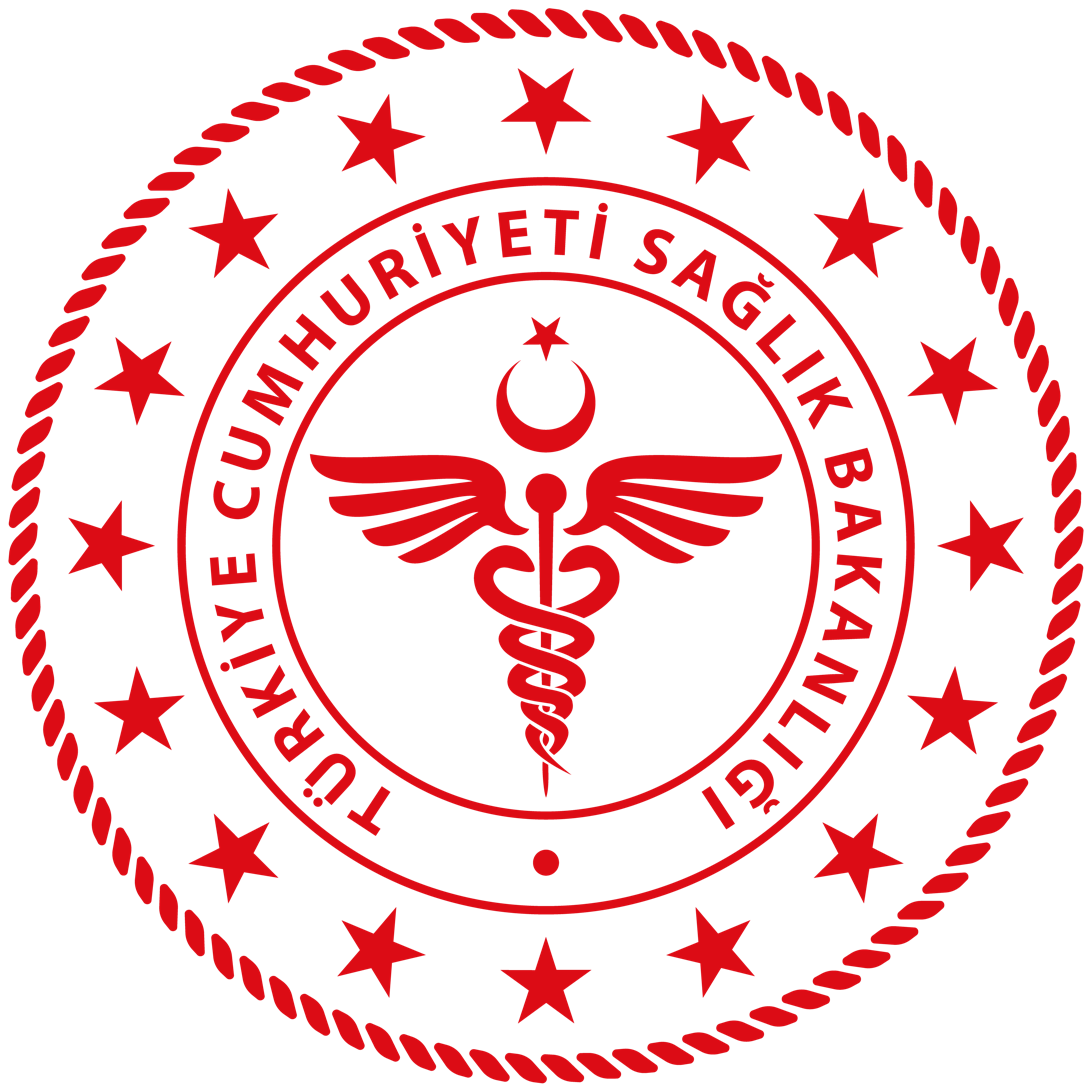

Agency overview
- Formed: 1920; 106 years ago
- Jurisdiction: Government of Turkey
- Headquarters: Ankara, Turkey
- Employees: 1.142.469
- Minister responsible: Kemal Memişoğlu, Minister of Health
- Website: www.saglik.gov.tr

The Ministry of Health (Turkish: Sağlık Bakanlığı) is the ministry of the Government of Turkey responsible for proposing and executing the government policy on health, planning and providing healthcare and protecting consumers. Likewise, it is responsible for proposing and executing the government policy on social cohesion and inclusion, family, protection of minors, youth and of care for dependent or disabled persons. The Ministry is headquartered in the Bakanlıklar in Ankara.

The Ministry of Health is headed by the Minister of Health, who is appointed by the President of Turkey at request of the Turkish Parliament. The current minister is Kemal Memişoğlu, serving since 2 July 2024.

== History ==
=== Foundation of Ministry (1920–1946) ===
Continuity and organization of healthcare were a key focus in the Seljuk-Ottoman medical tradition. Following the foundation of the Grand National Assembly of Turkey, the Ministry of Health was established on 3 May 1920. The main goal of this initial period was to heal the wounds of the war and to build the legislation rather than developing a regular registration system.

After the Republic was proclaimed, Dr. Refik Saydam held the ministerial office until 1937. Saydam contributed to the design and development of healthcare services in Turkey. In 1923, healthcare services were delivered at governmental and municipal facilities. The country had 86 hospitals and 6.437 patient beds back then. During this period the Law on Practice of Medicine and Medical Sciences (1928) and the Law on Public Hygiene (1930) were adopted. These two and similar other laws are still in effect. The health policies during this era had four main pillars:

- Plan, design and implement healthcare centrally,
- Organize preventive care at central level and curative care at local administrations,
- Raise the appeal of medical faculties to citizens to increase the number of health workers and enforce mandatory service for medical faculty graduates,
- Launch programs to fight against communicable diseases like malaria, syphilis, trachoma and leprosy.

Under these pillars, healthcare services were based on the "single-purpose care in broad geography - vertical organization" model. Legislation was developed to promote preventive care and local administrations were encouraged to open hospitals. The objective was to have a government physician in every district. Starting from densely populated settlements, diagnostic and treatment offices were opened in 150 district centers in 1924 and 20 more in 1936. The salaries of physicians providing preventive care were raised and they were forbidden to engage in private practice.

=== National Health Plan and Program (1946–1960) ===
The "First 10-Year National Health Plan", the first written health plan of Turkey, was adopted at the Supreme Health Council in 1946. The plan was announced by the Minister of Health Dr. Behçet Uz in 1946. It took nearly one and a half year for the National Health Plan to become a draft bill. It was approved by the Council of Ministers and at four different Parliamentary committees. However, the bill was not enacted because of the change of government. Although the National Health Plan and the National Health Program were not entirely implemented in the form of a law, the two documents deeply influenced the healthcare organization around the country.

The basic approach was to centralize inpatient facilities that had been controlled by local administrations. The Plan aimed to expand healthcare to rural areas by establishing a 10-bed health center for every 40 villages. The care design of these facilities consisted of delivering preventive and curative services together. By design, each facility included two physicians, one health officer, one midwife, one visiting nurse and a village midwife and a health officer for every 10 villages. The number of the health centers was 8 in 1945, 181 in 1955 and 283 in 1960.

The Maternal and Child Health Section was established at the Ministry of Health in 1952. A Maternal and Child Health Development Center was established in Ankara in 1953 with assistance from UNICEF and World Health Organization. In this period, pro-natalist policies were adopted due to high rate of child and infection related mortalities. Therefore, Turkey continued to increase the number of health centers, maternity facilities and infection prevention centers and strengthened its corps of health professionals.

In 1954, the Minister of Health announced the "National Health Program and Health Bank Studies". Following on the First 10-Year National Health Plan, the Program provided the building blocks of healthcare planning and organization in Turkey. The National Health Plan split the country into seven health regions (i.e. Ankara, Balıkesir, Erzurum, Diyarbakır, İzmir, Samsun and Seyhan). On the other hand, the National Health Program divided the country into 16 health regions.

After İstanbul and Ankara universities, the medical faculty of Ege University started admitting students in 1955 in order to strengthen the health workforce. The number of physicians, nurses and midwives increased more than 100% in 10 years.

Both the National Health Plan and the National Health Program were aimed to provide health insurance to citizens for a fee, cover the treatment costs of the uninsured poor from a special administration budget, set up a health bank to finance healthcare costs, control production of drugs, serums and vaccines and create industries to produce milk and baby formulas. For this purpose, the Biological Control Laboratory and a vaccination station were established at Refik Saydam Public Hygiene Center in 1947. The production of intradermal BCG started in the same year. The production of pertussis vaccines started in 1948. The Workers' Insurance Administration (Social Insurance Institution) was created in 1946. Health facilities and hospitals for insured workers were opened after 1952. In this period, legislation was developed for civil society organizations and various medical professions such as:

- Law on Turkish Medical Association (1953)
- Law on Pharmacists and Pharmacies (1953)
- Nursing Law (1954)
- Law on the Union of Turkish Pharmacists (1956)

=== Health Policies in the 1960–2002 Period ===
Socialization in health was launched in 1963 and expanded to the whole country in 1983. Health posts, health centers and district and provincial hospitals were opened countrywide to provide extensive, continuous, integrated and staged healthcare. The Population Planning Law adopted in 1965 shifted the policy of the country from a pro-natalist to an anti-natalist policy. The Ministry of Health was authorized to establish a dedicated organization, obtain or manufacture or outsource provision of contraceptive drugs, provide citizens in need with such drugs for free or on a rate cheaper than the production cost or take measures to that effect.

In 1990, the State Planning Organization prepared the "Healthcare Sector Master Planning Study" together with the Ministry of Health. This basic plan on the healthcare sector marked the beginning of a process of addressing health reforms. The preparatory theoretical efforts for the health reforms gained momentum with the First and Second National Health Congress held in 1992 and 1993. This introduced the green card for poor citizens without social security. This allowed low-income people to be covered by health insurance although the care package was limited. In 1993, the Ministry of Health developed the "National Health Policy" which consisted of five main components including support, environmental health, healthcare delivery and goals for healthy Turkey.

The main components of the Health Reform efforts in 1990s were as follows:

- Create General Health Insurance by merging all social security institutions,
- Introduce family practice for primary care,
- Grant autonomy to hospitals,
- Reorganize the Ministry of Health to become a planning and coordinating body with a special focus on preventive healthcare.

This was a period when major theoretical work was done but without noteworthy chances for implementation.

=== Health Transformation Program (2003–2013) ===
The Government of Turkey started the Health Transformation Program (HTP) in 2003. To address the challenges, the World Bank has supported Turkey's Health Transformation Program since 2003 with two Adaptable Program Loans (APLs). The Bank also provided technical guidance, and shared the experiences of other countries. The Plan included the following targets under the title "Health for All":

- Reorganize the administration and functions of the Ministry of Health,
- Cover all citizens under universal health care,
- Merge all health facilities under a single body,
- Grant administrative and financial autonomy to hospitals,
- Introduce family medicine,
- Attach special focus on maternal and child health,
- Expand preventive healthcare,
- Promote private sector investment in healthcare,
- Delegate powers to lower levels in all public institutions,
- Address shortage of health professionals in priority development regions
- Launch digital transformation in health.

The Program was developed and launched in early 2003 based on the earlier experiences including socialization and subsequent health reform efforts. Complaints about long waiting lists decreased. Patients stranded in hospitals for failing to pay the bills became a thing of the past as the main concern was the provision of social insurance and universal health care. After addressing the emergency transportation issues, demands were now focused on qualified intensive care unit beds in sufficient numbers.

The 60th government of Turkey added three more points to HTP which are the promotion of healthy lifestyle, mobilizing stakeholders and multi-dimensional health responsibility for intersectoral collaboration and deliver cross-border health services which will for furthering Turkey's position internationally.

In 2003, only 39.5% of the population was satisfied with health services, whereas by 2011 this proportion had increased to 75.9%. In the same period, the overall health workforce increased by 36 percent, growing from 295,000 to 460,000.

== Organization ==
The following units are linked to the Ministry of Health:

- Internal Audit Unit
- Inspection Board
- Department of Strategy Development
- Office of Press and Public Relations
- Medicines and Medical Devices Institution
- General Directorate of Legal Services
- General Directorate of Emergency Health Services
- General Directorate of Health Promotion
- General Directorate of Administrative Services
- General Directorate of Health Investments
- General Directorate of Health Information System
- General Directorate of EU and Foreign Affairs
- General Directorate of Health Services
- General Directorate of Borders And Coastal Health of Turkey
- General Directorate of Turkish Public Hospitals
- General Directorate of Public Health

== Ministers ==
The first Turkish Minister of Health was Dr. Adnan Adıvar. The current minister is Dr. Fahrettin Koca, serving since 10 July 2018.

Name of Minister	Period of Service
Dr. Adnan Adıvar	1920 - 1921
Dr. Refik Saydam	1921 - 1921
Dr. Rıza Nur	1921 - 1923
Dr. Refik Saydam	1923 - 1924
Dr. Mazhar Germen	1924 - 1925
Dr. Refik Saydam	1925 - 1937
Dr. Ahmet Hulusi Alataş	1937 - 1945
Dr. Sadi Konuk	1945 - 1946
Dr. Behçet Uz	1946 - 1948
Dr. Kemali Bayazıt	1948 - 1950
Prof. Dr. Nihat Reşat Belger	1950 - 1950
Dr. Ekrem Hayri Üstündağ	1950 - 1954
Dr. Behçet Uz	1954 - 1955
Nafiz Körez	1955 - 1957
Dr. Lütfi Kırdar	1957 - 1960
Prof. Dr. Nusret Karasu	1960 - 1960
Prof. Dr. Nusret Hasan Fişek	1960 - 1960
Prof. Dr. Salih Ragıp Üner	1960 - 1961
Dr. Süleyman Suat Seren	1961 - 1962
Dr. Yusuf Azizoğlu	1962 - 1963
Prof. Dr. Fahrettin Kerim Gökay	1963 - 1963
Dr. Kemal Demir	1963 - 1965
Dr. Faruk Sükan	1965 - 1965
Dr. Edip Somunoğlu	1965 - 1967
Dr. Vedat Ali Özkan	1967 - 1971
Prof. Dr. Türkan Akyol	1971 - 1971
Dr. Cevdet Aykan	1971 - 1972
Dr. Kemal Demir	1972 - 1973
Dr. Vefa Tanır	1973 - 1974
Dr. Selahattin Cizrelioğlu	1974 - 1974
Dr. Kemal Demir	1974 - 1977
Dr. Vefa Tanır	1977 - 1977
Prof. Dr. Celal Ertuğ	1977 - 1977
Cengiz Gökçek	1977 - 1978
Dr. Mete Tan	1978 - 1979
Dr. Münif İslamoğlu	1979 - 1980
Prof. Dr. Necmi Ayanoğlu	1980 - 1981
Prof. Dr. Kaya Kılıçturgay	1981 - 1983
Mehmet Aydın	1983 - 1986
Dr. Mustafa Kalemli	1986 - 1987
Bülent Akarcalı	1987 - 1988
Cemil Çiçek	1988 - 1988
Nihat Kitapçı	1988 - 1989
Halil Şıvgın	1989 - 1991
Dr. Yaşar Eryılmaz	1991 - 1991
Dr. Yıldırım Aktuna	1991 - 1993
Rıfat Serdaroğlu	1993 - 1993
Kazım Dinç	1993 - 1994
Dr. Doğan Baran	1994 - 1996
Dr. Yıldırım Aktuna	1996 - 1997
Dr. İsmail Karakuyu	1997 - 1997
Dr. Halil İbrahim Özsoy	1997 - 1999
Dr. Mustafa Güven Karahan	1999 - 1999
Dr. Osman Durmuş	1999 - 2002
Prof. Dr. Recep Akdağ	2002 - 2013
Dr. Mehmet Müezzinoğlu	2013 - 2016
Prof. Dr. Recep Akdağ	2016 - 2017
Dr. Ahmet Demircan	2017 - 2018
Dr. Fahrettin Koca	2018 - 2024
Prof. Dr. Kemal Memişoğlu	2024–present

== See also ==
- National Medical Rescue Team (UMKE)
- White Helmets (Syrian Civil War)
- Coronavirus Scientific Advisory Board (Turkey)
- Air pollution in Turkey
