= 66th cabinet of Turkey =

Members of President Erdoğan's Cabinet

Fourth Erdoğan Cabinet IV. Erdoğan Hükûmeti
- 66th Cabinet of Turkey
- 2018–2023
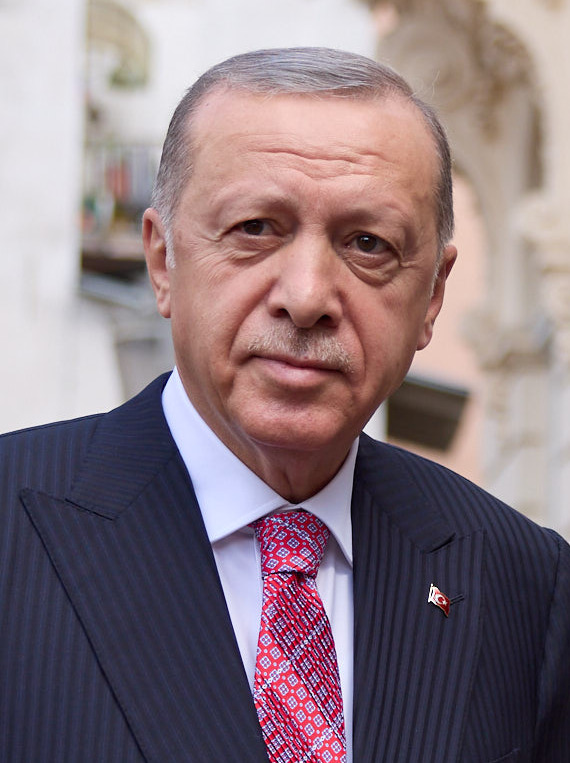
- Date formed: 10 July 2018
- Date dissolved: 3 June 2023

People and organisations
- President: Recep Tayyip Erdoğan
- Vice President: Fuat Oktay
- No. of ministers: 17
- Total no. of members: 19
- Member party: Justice and Development Party; Independent(s)
- Status in legislature: Minority with MHP and BBP confidence & supply
- Opposition party: Republican People's Party
- Opposition leader: Kemal Kılıçdaroğlu

History
- Election: 2018 Turkish presidential election
- Legislature term: 27th Parliament of Turkey
- Predecessor: Yıldırım Cabinet
- Successor: Erdogan V Cabinet

The Fourth Erdoğan Cabinet was the 66th government of the Republic of Turkey, which was declared on 9 July 2018. It is the first cabinet after Turkey's transition into a presidential republic. It was also the first cabinet that did not require parliamentary approval to be formed, and thus contained a higher number of technocrats than previous Turkish cabinets.

== Structural changes ==
In this new system, the number of ministries were reduced from 21 to 16. Also, six new cabinet posts have been established, including the office of the Vice President. A statutory decree was issued to merge several ministries, and also to abolish certain organizational and functional laws of some ministries and institutions.

Previous name	Current name
Ministry of Labour and Social Security	Ministry of Family, Labor and Social Services
Ministry of Family and Social Policy	Ministry of Family, Labor and Social Services
Ministry of Science, Industry and Technology	Ministry of Industry and Technology
Ministry of Development	Ministry of Industry and Technology
Ministry of Customs and Trade	Ministry of Trade
Ministry of Economy	Ministry of Trade
Ministry of Food, Agriculture and Livestock	Ministry of Agriculture and Forestry
Ministry of Forest and Water Management	Ministry of Agriculture and Forestry
Ministry of Finance	Ministry of Treasury and Finance
Undersecretariat of the Treasury	Ministry of Treasury and Finance
Ministry of Transport, Maritime and Communication	Ministry of Transport and Infrastructure
Ministry of European Union Affairs	Merged into the Ministry of Foreign Affairs

=== Changes in 2021 ===
On 21 April 2021, the Ministry of Family, Labor and Social Services was divided into two with a presidential decree published in the official government gazette.

Previous name	Current name
Ministry of Family, Labor and Social Services	Ministry of Family and Social Services
Ministry of Family, Labor and Social Services	Ministry of Labour and Social Security
Ministry of Environment and Urbanisation	Ministry of Environment, Urbanisation and Climate Change

== Cabinet changes ==
On 27 March 2020, Transport and Infrastructure Minister Mehmet Cahit Turhan was replaced by the President.

On 10 April 2020, Minister of the Interior Süleyman Soylu issued a curfew due to increasing COVID-19 cases. The late announcement and the panic it created among the public was widely criticized. On 12 April 2020, Süleyman Soylu issued an apology and announced his resignation. However, his resignation was rejected by the President and Soylu continued his duties as minister.

On 8 November 2020, Treasury and Finance Minister Berat Albayrak announced his resignation citing health reasons. His resignation was approved the next day by the President.

On 21 April 2021, two new ministries were established as the Ministry of Family, Labor and Social Services was split into two. Minister of Family, Labor and Social Services Zehra Zümrüt Selçuk was dismissed. Derya Yanık was appointed to the Ministry of Family and Social Policy and Vedat Bilgin was appointed to the Ministry of Labor and Social Security. In addition, Ruhsar Pekcan was replaced by Mehmet Muş as the new Minister of Trade.

== Composition ==
Office	Image	Minister	Party	Took office	Left office
President of Turkey; Cumhurbaşkanı		Recep Tayyip Erdoğan (born 1954)	Justice and Development	9 July 2018	3 June 2023
Vice President of Turkey; Cumhurbaşkanı Yardımcısı		Fuat Oktay (born 1964)	Justice and Development	10 July 2018	3 June 2023
Ministry of Justice; Adalet Bakanlığı		Abdulhamit Gül (born 1977)	Justice and Development	10 July 2018	28 January 2022
Ministry of Justice; Adalet Bakanlığı		Bekir Bozdağ (born 1965)	Justice and Development	28 January 2022	3 June 2023
Ministry of Family, Labour and Social Services; Aile, Çalışma ve Sosyal Hizmetler Bakanlığı		Zehra Zümrüt Selçuk (born 1979)	Independent	10 July 2018	21 April 2021
Ministry of Family and Social Services; Aile ve Sosyal Hizmetler Bakanlığı		Derya Yanık (born 1972)	Justice and Development	21 April 2021	3 June 2023
Ministry of Labour and Social Security; Çalışma ve Sosyal Güvenlik Bakanlığı		Vedat Bilgin (born 1954)	Justice and Development	21 April 2021	3 June 2023
Ministry of Environment and Urbanisation; Çevre ve Şehircilik Bakanlığı		Murat Kurum (born 1976)	Justice and Development	10 July 2018	3 June 2023
Ministry of Foreign Affairs; Dışişleri Bakanlığı		Mevlüt Çavuşoğlu (born 1968)	Justice and Development	10 July 2018	3 June 2023
Ministry of Energy and Natural Resources; Enerji ve Tabii Kaynaklar Bakanlığı		Fatih Dönmez (born 1965)	Justice and Development	10 July 2018	3 June 2023
Ministry of Youth and Sports; Gençlik ve Spor Bakanlığı		Mehmet Kasapoğlu (born 1976)	Justice and Development	10 July 2018	3 June 2023
Ministry of Treasury and Finance; Hazine ve Maliye Bakanlığı		Berat Albayrak (born 1978)	Justice and Development	10 July 2018	9 November 2020
Ministry of Treasury and Finance; Hazine ve Maliye Bakanlığı		Lütfi Elvan (born 1962)	Justice and Development	10 November 2020	2 December 2021
Ministry of Treasury and Finance; Hazine ve Maliye Bakanlığı		Nureddin Nebati (born 1964)	Justice and Development	2 December 2021	3 June 2023
Ministry of the Interior; İçişleri Bakanlığı		Süleyman Soylu (born 1969)	Justice and Development	10 July 2018	3 June 2023
Ministry of Culture and Tourism; Kültür ve Turizm Bakanlığı		Mehmet Ersoy (born 1968)	Independent	10 July 2018	3 June 2023
Ministry of National Education; Millî Eğitim Bakanlığı		Ziya Selçuk (born 1961)	Independent	10 July 2018	6 August 2021
Ministry of National Education; Millî Eğitim Bakanlığı		Mahmut Özer (born 1970)	Justice and Development	6 August 2021	3 June 2023
Ministry of National Defense; Millî Savunma Bakanlığı		Hulusi Akar (born 1952)	Justice and Development	10 July 2018	3 June 2023
Ministry of Health; Sağlık Bakanlığı		Fahrettin Koca (born 1965)	Independent	10 July 2018	3 June 2023
Ministry of Industry and Technology; Sanayi ve Teknoloji Bakanlığı		Mustafa Varank (born 1976)	Justice and Development	10 July 2018	3 June 2023
Ministry of Agriculture and Forestry; Tarım ve Orman Bakanlığı		Bekir Pakdemirli (born 1973)	Justice and Development	10 July 2018	4 March 2022
Ministry of Agriculture and Forestry; Tarım ve Orman Bakanlığı		Vahit Kirişçi (born 1960)	Justice and Development	4 March 2022	3 June 2023
Ministry of Trade; Ticaret Bakanlığı		Ruhsar Pekcan (born 1958)	Independent	10 July 2018	21 April 2021
Ministry of Trade; Ticaret Bakanlığı		Mehmet Muş (born 1982)	Justice and Development	21 April 2021	3 June 2023
Ministry of Transport and Infrastructure; Ulaştırma ve Altyapı Bakanlığı		Mehmet Cahit Turhan (born 1960)	Independent	10 July 2018	28 March 2020
Ministry of Transport and Infrastructure; Ulaştırma ve Altyapı Bakanlığı		Adil Karaismailoğlu (born 1969)	Justice and Development	28 March 2020	3 June 2023
