= Vedat =

- Gender: Male
- Language: Turkish, Albanian

Origin
- Language: Semitic
- Meaning: Friendship, love

Other names
- Variant form: Vedad
- Cognate: Medad

Vedat is a masculine given name meaning "friendship, love". It is commonly used in Turkey, and less commonly in Albania, North Macedonia, and Kosovo. The name has one variant, "Vedad", a very common given name in Bosnia and Herzegovina. The name and more specifically its Arabic original name "Widad" is cognate with the Hebrew name "Medad" which also has the same meanings; love and friendship, coming from their shared Semitic origins. Notable people with the name include:

== Given name ==
- Vedat Ademi (born 1982), Albanian-Kosovar singer-songwriter
- Vedat Aksoy (born 1988), Turkish para archer
- Vedat Albayrak (born 1993), Turkish judoka
- Vedat Aydın (1953–1991), Turkish politician and lawyer
- Vedat Örfi Bengü (1900–1953), Turkish filmmaker and actor
- Vedat Bilgin (born 1954), Turkish politician and intellectual
- Vedat Bora (born 1995), Turkish footballer
- Vedat Buz (born 1966), Turkish jurist
- Vedat Dalokay (1927–1991), Turkish politician and architect
- Vedat Demir (born 1966), Turkish academic, journalist, and writer
- Vedat Demiröz (born 1956), Turkish politician
- Vedat Erbay (born 1967), Turkish archer
- Vedat Erincin (born 1957), Turkish-German actor
- Vedat Hödük (born 1994), Turkish kickboxer
- Vedat İnceefe, (born 1974), Turkish footballer
- Vedat Işıkhan (born 1966), Turkish politician and professor
- Vedat Kapurtu (born 1978), Turkish footballer
- Vedat Karakuş (born 1998), Turkish footballer
- Vedat Kokona (1913–1998), Albanian translator, writer, and lexicologist
- Vedat Muriqi (born 1994), Kosovan footballer
- Vedat Okyar (1945–2009), Turkish footballer
- Vedat Önsoy (born 1959), Turkish boxer
- Vedat Şar (born 1995), Turkish psychiatrist and professor
- Vedat Tek (1873–1942), Turkish architect
- Vedat Nedim Tör, Turkish writer
- Vedat Türkali (1919–2016), Turkish screenwriter, playwright, and intellectual
- Vedat Tutuk (born 1963), Turkish boxer
- Vedat Uysal (born 1962), Turkish footballer and manager
- Vedat Yenerer (1965–2026), Turkish journalist and writer
