= Vedad =

Male given name

- Gender: Male

Origin
- Meaning: Love, friendship

Other names
- Variant form: Vedat (name)
- Related names: Medad

Vedad is a male given name.

In the Balkans, Vedad is popular among Bosniaks in the former Yugoslav nations. It is derived from the Arabic name Widad, which holds the meanings of "love" and "friendship."

== Given name ==
- Vedad Ibišević (born 1984), Bosnian footballer
- Vedad Karic (born 1988), Bosnian cyclist
- Vedad Radonja (born 2001), Bosnian footballer
