= Chile–Turkey relations =

- Chile: Turkey

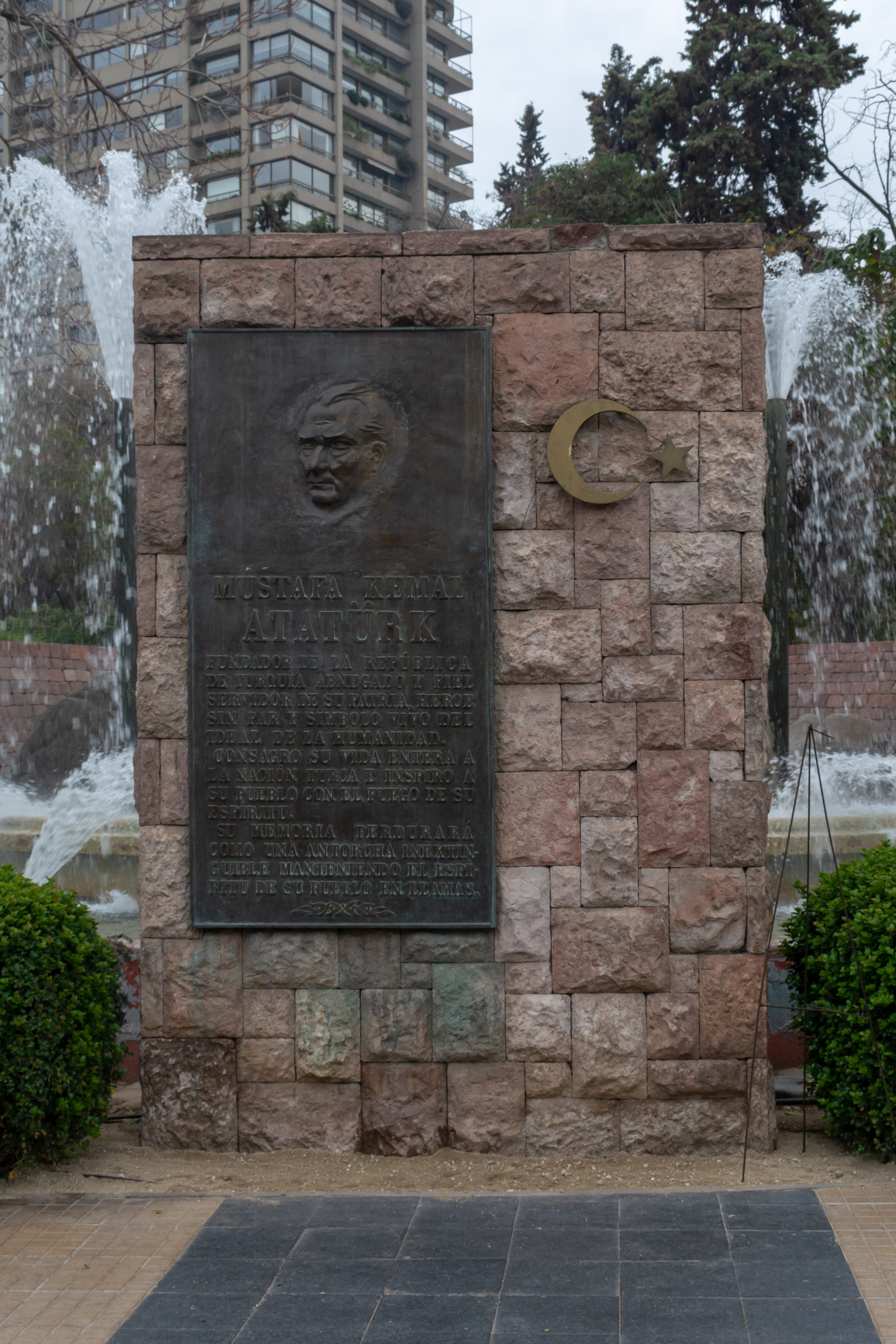
Mustafa Kemal Atatürk Monument in Santiago, Chile

Chile–Turkey relations are the bilateral relations between Chile and Turkey.

== History ==
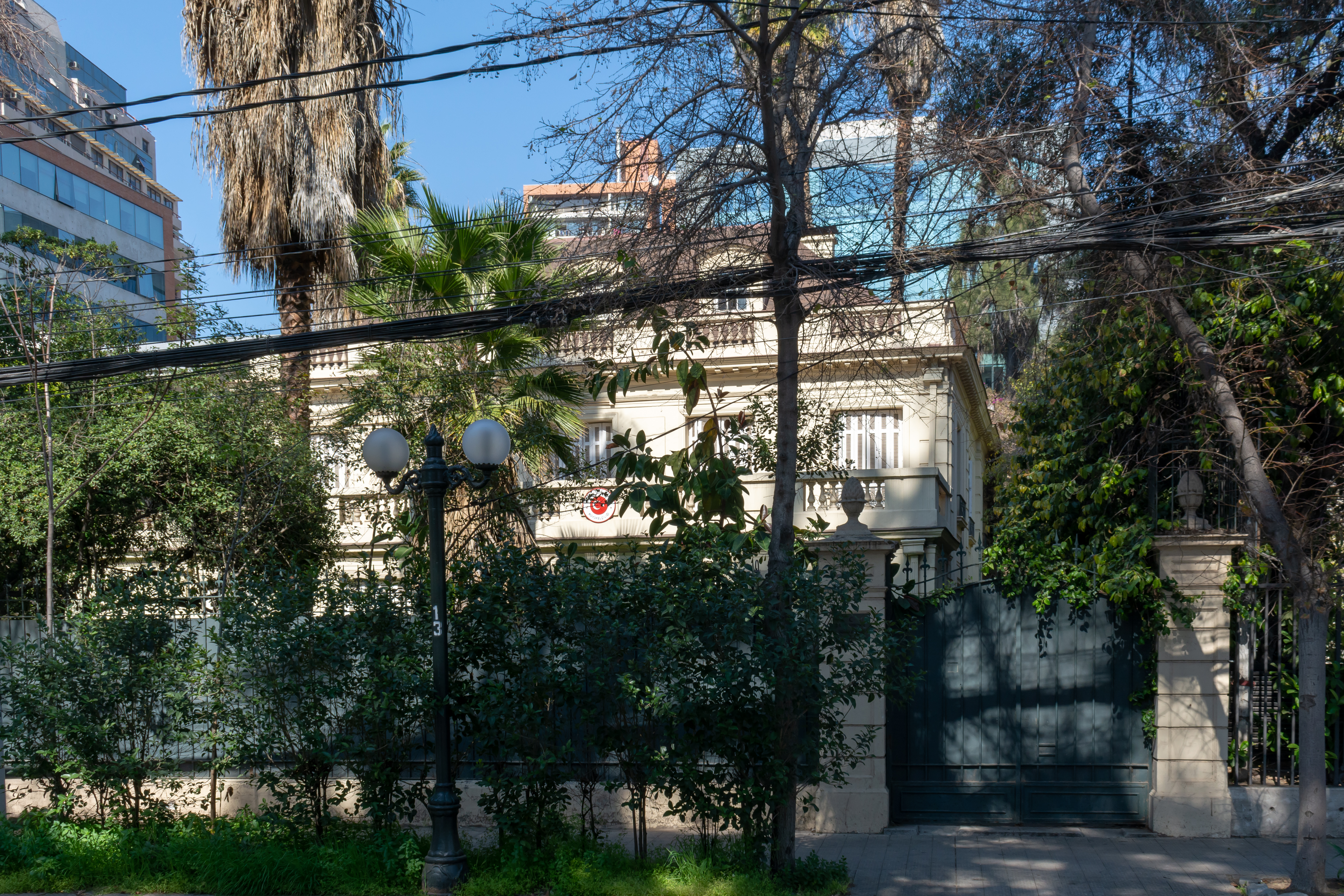
Embassy of Turkey in Santiago

Chile was the first country in Latin America which recognized Turkey with the Friendship Treaty, on January 30, 1926. In Santiago, there can be found the Mustafa Kemal Atatürk Plaza, Atatürk College and Atatürk Monument.

In 1930, the Turkish Embassy in Chile opened as the Turks rewarded the Chileans for formally recognizing their country in 1926. The Chilean embassy in Turkey opened in 1941.

In addition, Turkey includes a Chile Square in Ankara inaugurated on September 18, 1970, that contains the Bernardo O'Higgins Monument. The Pablo Neruda square in Turkey was inaugurated in 2007.

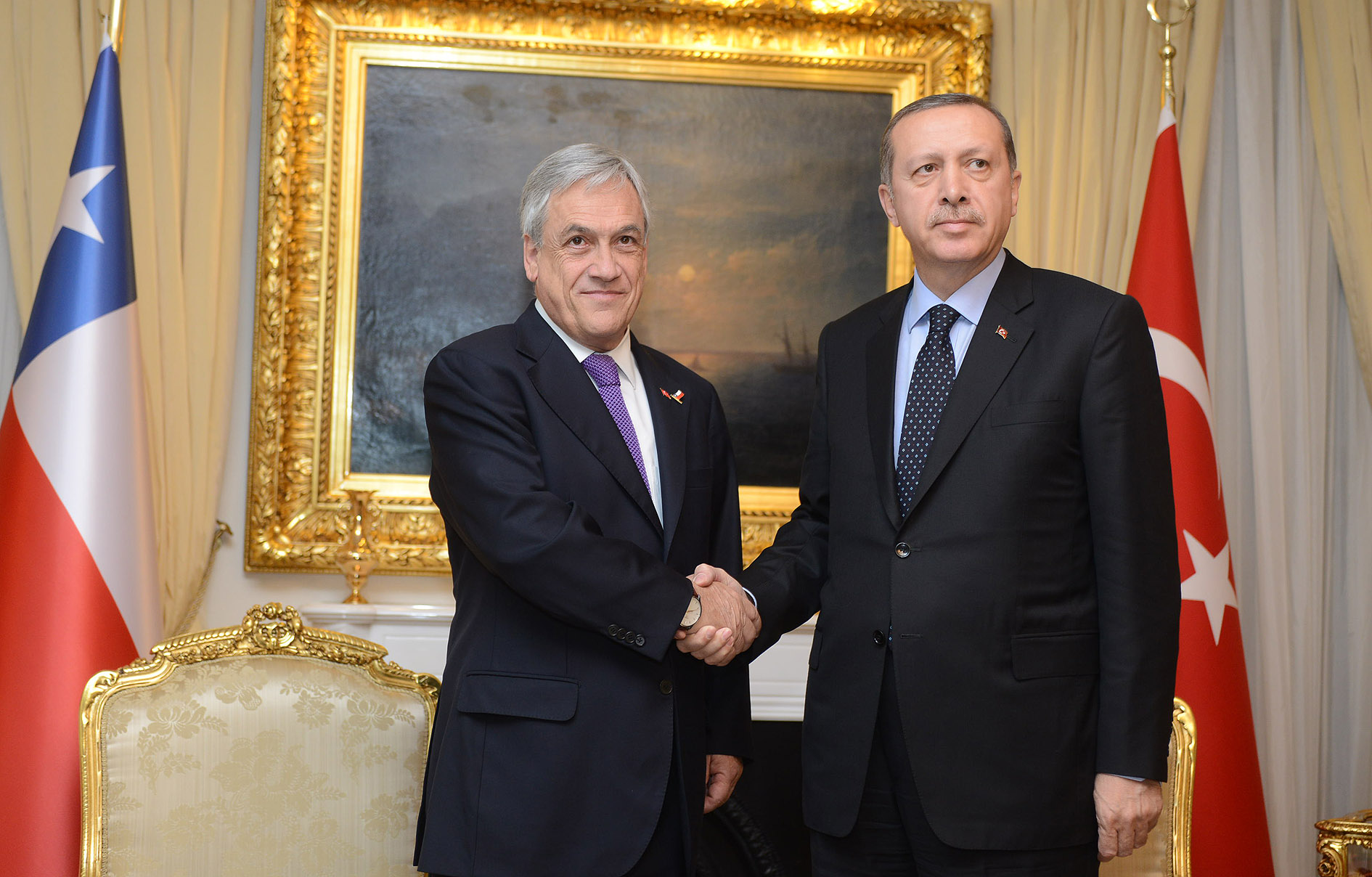
Turkish president Recep Tayyip Erdoğan and Chilean president Sebastián Piñera

== Presidential visits ==
Guest	Host	Place of visit	Date of visit
(Turkey) President Süleyman Demirel	(Chile) President Eduardo Frei Ruiz-Tagle	La Moneda Palace, Santiago	April 6, 1995
(Chile) President Ricardo Lagos	(Turkey) President Ahmet Necdet Sezer	Çankaya Köşkü, Ankara	October 12, 2004
(Chile) President Sebastián Piñera	(Turkey) President Abdullah Gül	Çankaya Köşkü, Ankara	November 20, 2012
(Turkey) President Recep Tayyip Erdoğan	(Chile) President Sebastián Piñera	La Moneda Palace, Santiago	January 31, 2016

== Diplomatic missions ==
Turkey has an embassy in Santiago. The embassy also hosts offices of representatives and attachés from Ministry of the Interior, Ministry of Trade and Turkish Armed Forces. The relations between Turkey and Chile goes back to the opening of the Turkish Embassy in Santiago on 2 August 1930.

Chile has an embassy in Ankara.

== Diaspora ==
According to a TV program titled 5N1K (CNN Türk), about 1,000 Turkish citizens live in Chile.

== See also ==
- Foreign relations of Chile
- Foreign relations of Turkey
