= Ahmet Erdem =

Turkish civil servant

Minister of Labour and Social Security
- In office 28 August 2015 – 17 November 2015
- Prime Minister: Ahmet Davutoğlu
- Preceded by: Faruk Çelik
- Succeeded by: Süleyman Soylu

Undersecretary to the Labour and Social Security Ministry
- Incumbent
- Assumed office 28 April 2014
- Minister: Faruk Çelik
- Preceded by: Fatih Acar
- In office 14 November 2007 – 6 July 2009
- Minister: Faruk Çelik; Ömer Dinçer
- Preceded by: Enis Yeter
- Succeeded by: Birol Aydemir

Personal details
- Born: 1956 (age 69–70) Tokat, Tokat Province, Turkey
- Party: Independent
- Occupation: Civil servant
- Cabinet: 63rd

Ahmet Erdem is a Turkish civil servant who served as the Minister of Labour and Social Security in the interim election government formed by Prime Minister Ahmet Davutoğlu between 28 August and 17 November 2015. He was formerly the General Secretary of the Labour and Social Security Ministry Supreme Arbitration Board, Deputy Undersecretary, advisor to the Minister and advisor to the Prime Minister. He serves as the Undersecretary to the Labour and Social Security Ministry since 28 April 2014.

== Life and early career ==
Ahmet Erdem was born in Tokat in 1956 and completed his primary, secondary and high school education there. He moved to Ankara for higher education and master's degree. He later became a civil servant, working mainly at the Ministry of Labour and Social Security in various roles.

=== Civil service career ===
Erdem spent much of his career working at the Labour and Social Security Ministry. He first became the General Secretary of the Labour and Social Security Ministry Supreme Arbitration Board before becoming the Deputy Undersecretary to the Ministry. He was later appointed as the advisor to the Minister and was then appointed as an advisor to the Prime Minister of Turkey. Between 14 November 2007 and 6 July 2009, he served as the Undersecretary to the Ministry of Labour and Social Security. On 28 April 2014, he was appointed to this role for a second time.

== Minister of Labour and Social Security ==
After the June 2015 general election resulted in a hung parliament, unsuccessful coalition negotiations raised speculation over whether President Recep Tayyip Erdoğan would call an early election in the event that AKP leader Ahmet Davutoğlu was unable to form a government within the given constitutional time of 45 days. As required by the 114th article of the Constitution of Turkey, the calling of a snap general election by the President necessitates the forming of an interim election government, in which all parties represented in Parliament are given a certain number of ministers according to how many MPs they have. If a party refused to send ministers to the interim cabinet, then independents must take their place.

Erdoğan called a new general election for November 2015 in late August, with Davutoğlu being tasked with the formation of the interim government. With the main opposition Republican People's Party (CHP) and the Nationalist Movement Party (MHP) refusing to send ministers to the cabinet, the 8 ministries that the two parties were entitled to were vacated for independents. As a result, Erdem was appointed as the Minister of Labour and Social Security as an independent politician.

== See also ==
- List of Turkish civil servants
