= Adil Karaismailoğlu =

Turkish mechanical engineer and politician

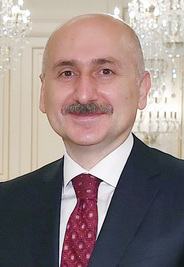
- Adil Karaismailoğlu (March 2020)

Minister of Transport and Infrastructure
- In office 28 March 2020 – 4 June 2023
- President: Recep Tayyip Erdoğan
- Preceded by: Mehmet Cahit Turhan
- Succeeded by: Abdulkadir Uraloğlu

Personal details
- Born: 1969 (age 56–57) Trabzon, Turkey
- Party: Justice and Development Party (since 2023)
- Other political affiliations: Independent (until 2023)
- Children: 2
- Education: Karadeniz Technical University
- Occupation: Mechanical engineer, politician

Adil Karaismailoğlu (born 1969) is a Turkish politician, mechanical engineer, and civil servant.

Adil Karaismailoğlu was born in Trabzon, northern Turkey in 1969. After finishing the Trabzon High School, he studied Mechanical engineering at Karadeniz Technical University graduating with the title B.Eng. He later earned his M.Eng. title in Urban Systems and Transportation management from Bahçeşehir University.

He started his working life at the Transportation Coordination Department of the Istanbul Metropolitan Municipality (İBB) in 1995. From 1998 onwards, he worked in the municipality's city bus company İETT as an engineer and later in managerial positions. In 2002, he was assigned to the Traffic Control Center of the IBB's Traffic Department as assistant manager for Signalling control and Intelligent transportation system. He was appointed Manager of the Transportation Coordination Department on 16 November 2009, and Head of Transportation Department on 23 July 2014. His next positions were Head of Istanbul Real Estate Department at the governmental holding authority TOKI from July 2016, and Assistant secretary general of the Mayor of Istanbul from April 2018. He resigned from the post at the Istanbul Metropolitan Municipality after the Republican People's Party's mayor Ekrem İmamoğlu took office on 28 June 2019.

On 20 September 2019, he was appointed Deputy Minister at the Ministry of Transport and Infrastructure. On 28 March 2020, President Recep Tayyip Erdoğan replaced Minister Mehmet Cahit Turhan in the Cabinet Erdoğan IV with Karaismailoğlu. He served as Minister of Transport and Infrastructure from 2020 to 2023.

In the 2023 Turkish parliamentary election he was elected to the Grand National Assembly of Turkey from Trabzon for the Justice and Development Party.

Political offices
Preceded by Mehmet Cahit Turhan	Minister of Transport and Infrastructure; 28 March 2020 – 4 June 2023	Succeeded by Abdulkadir Uraloğlu
