= Faruk Çelik =

Turkish politician (born 1956)

Faruk Çelik MP
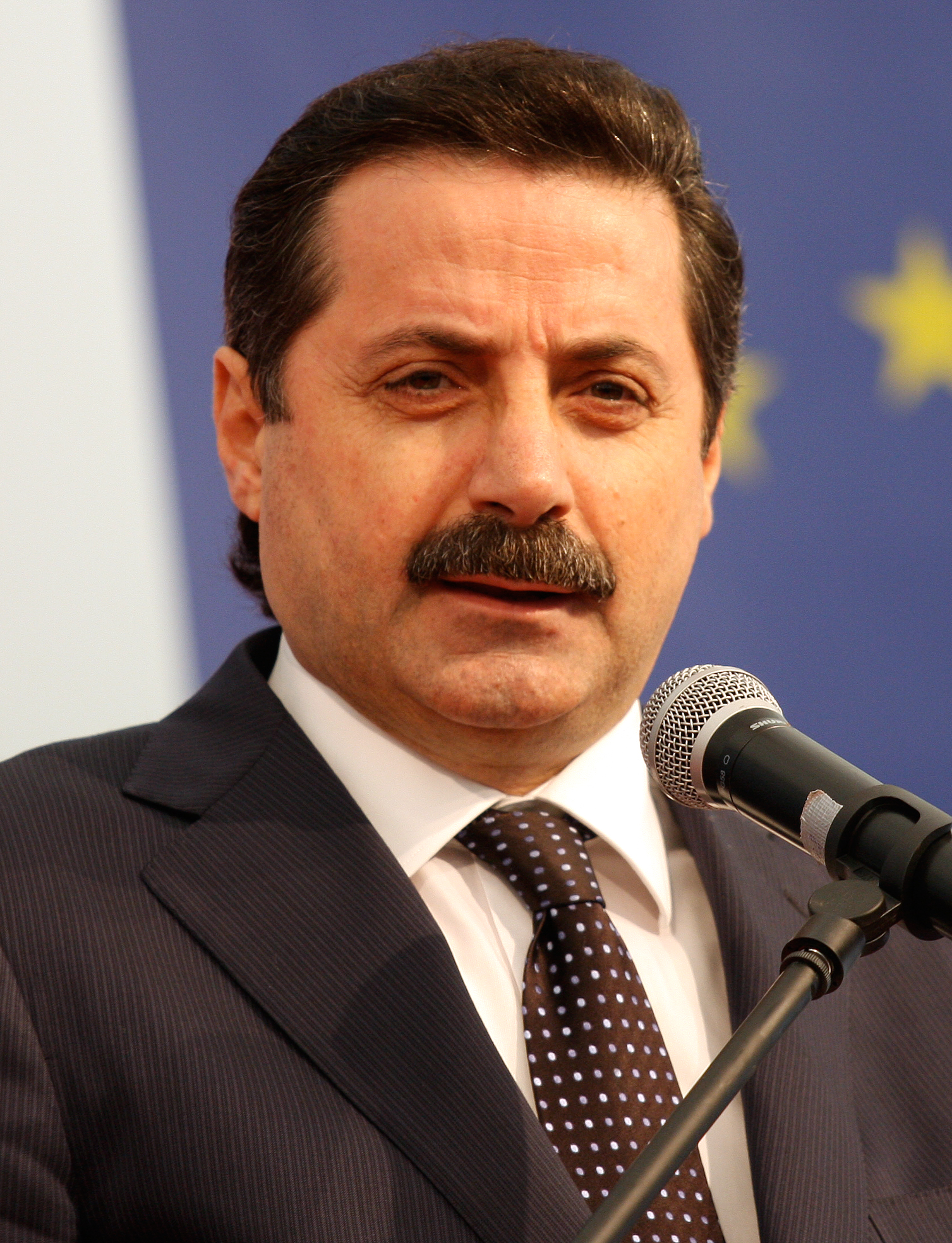

Minister of Food, Agriculture and Livestock
- In office 24 November 2015 – 19 July 2017
- Prime Minister: Ahmet Davutoğlu; Binali Yıldırım
- Preceded by: Kutbettin Arzu
- Succeeded by: Ahmet Eşref Fakıbaba

Minister of Labour and Social Security
- In office 6 July 2011 – 28 August 2015
- Prime Minister: Recep Tayyip Erdoğan; Ahmet Davutoğlu
- Preceded by: Ömer Dinçer
- Succeeded by: Ahmet Erdem
- In office 29 August 2007 – 1 May 2009
- Prime Minister: Recep Tayyip Erdoğan
- Preceded by: Murat Başesgioğlu
- Succeeded by: Ömer Dinçer

Minister of State (Responsible for Religious Affairs and Turkish World)
- In office 1 May 2009 – 6 July 2011
- Prime Minister: Recep Tayyip Erdoğan
- Preceded by: Mustafa Sait Yazıcıoğlu
- Succeeded by: Position abolished

Member of the Grand National Assembly
- Incumbent
- Assumed office 1 November 2015
- Constituency: Şanlıurfa (Nov 2015); Artvin (2023)
- In office 18 April 1999 – 7 June 2015
- Constituency: Bursa (1999, 2002, 2007); Şanlıurfa (2011)

Personal details
- Born: 17 January 1956 (age 70) Yusufeli, Artvin Province, Turkey
- Party: Virtue Party (1999–2001); Justice and Development Party (2001–present)
- Education: Uludağ University
- Cabinet: 60th, 61st, 62nd, 64th, 65th

Faruk Çelik (born 17 January 1956) is a Turkish politician and a Member of Parliament for Bursa of the ruling Justice and Development Party. He served in various ministerial roles from 2009 to 2017, most recently as the Minister of Work and Social Security. He was the Minister of Food, Agriculture and Livestock.

Previously he had been a teacher and a businessman. One of the leading members of the Justice and Development Party, he was made parliamentary group leader upon his election as an MP in 2002. He was made Minister of Work in 2007.
