= Laborer union (Turkey) =

Laborer union is the first social aid organization of Turkey, which was established on 22 July 1923 with the "Amelebirliği Talimatnamesi," approved by the Council of Ministers.

== Details ==
Its foundations are based on the law enacted on September 10, 1921, with the law no. 151 on the rights of workers in the coal basin in and around Zonguldak. The short name of the law is Havza-i Fahmiyye Amele Kanunu. Laborer union was established on the basis of Article 4 of this law, and its establishment was approved by the Council of Ministers, whose name was the executive committee at that time, on July 22, 1923. It is accepted as Turkey's first social security institution. The organization, which was affiliated to the Ministry of Commerce in the first years of its establishment, continues its activities under the Ministry of Labor and Social Services today. The approximate number of members is 20,000.
