= Ahmet Arslan (politician) =

Turkish politician (born 1962)

Ahmet Arslan MP
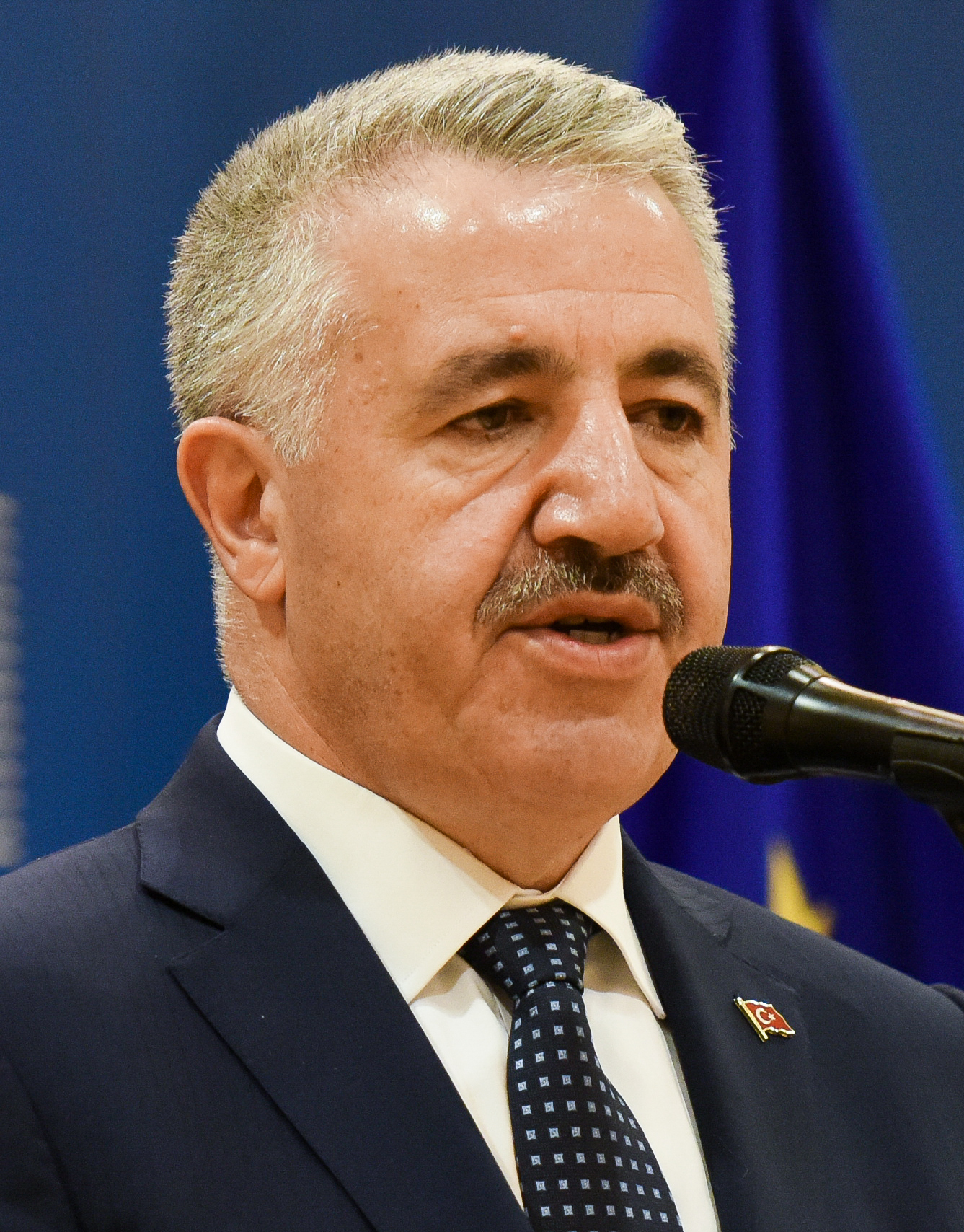

4th Minister of Transport, Maritime and Communication
- In office 24 May 2016 – 10 July 2018
- Prime Minister: Binali Yıldırım
- Deputy: Yüksel Coşkunyürek
- Preceded by: Binali Yıldırım
- Succeeded by: Mehmet Cahit Turhan

Member of the Grand National Assembly
- Incumbent
- Assumed office 12 June 2011
- Constituency: Kars (2011, Jun 2015, Nov 2015)

Personal details
- Born: 2 June 1962 (age 64) Kağızman, Kars Province, Turkey
- Party: Justice and Development Party
- Education: Istanbul Technical University
- Cabinet: 65th

Ahmet Arslan (born 2 June 1962) is a Turkish politician from the Justice and Development Party (AK Party) who served as the Minister of Transport, Maritime and Communication from 24 May 2016 until 10 July 2018. He is a Member of Parliament for the electoral district of Kars, having first been elected in the November 2015 general election.

== Early life and career ==
Ahmet Arslan was born on 2 June 1962 in the district of Kağızman, Kars Province. He graduated from the National Security Academy and the Istanbul Technical University School of Maritime as a Shipping Construction and Mechanical Engineer. He later became a civil servant, first joining the Maritime Undersecretariat as a Department Manager and Deputy General Manager. He went on to serve at the Ministry of Transport as the Director of the General Directorate of Rail, Ports and Airport Construction (DLH). He also served as an executive board member of the General Directorate of State Airports Authority (DHMİ).

Arslan worked in the private sector for seven years, taking on numerous roles. He also worked at the Pendik Shipyard in Istanbul. He was also a member of the executive boards of TTNET and the Türk Loydu Foundation, while serving on the supervisory board of Türksat. He also served as a member of the Maritime Assembly at the Union of Chambers and Commodity Exchanges of Turkey (TOBB).

=== Awards ===
During his early career, he was given the 'Turkish World Engineering Award' and became an honorary Professor, while also receiving the '2010 Annual Bureaucrats who turn negatives into positives' award.

== Minister of Transport, Maritime and Communication ==
Arslan was elected as a Member of Parliament for the electoral district of Kars from the Justice and Development Party (AK Party) in the November 2015 general election. Following the resignation of Prime Minister Ahmet Davutoğlu in May 2016, the AK Party held an Extraordinary Congress on 22 May to elect his successor as leader. Serving Minister of Transport, Maritime and Communication Binali Yıldırım was elected unopposed and formed the 65th government of Turkey on 24 May 2016, appointing Arslan as his successor as Transport Minister.

== See also ==
- List of Turkish civil servants

Political offices
Preceded by Binali Yıldırım	Minister of Transport, Maritime and Communication; 24 May 2016 – 10 July 2018	Succeeded by Mehmet Cahit Turhan
