= Accident Investigation Board (Turkey) =

Civil transportation investigation board

Accident Investigation Board (Turkish: Kaza Araştırma ve İnceleme Kurulu) was civil transportation accident investigation board of Turkey. The board established on May 6, 2013, and abolished on May 11, 2019. It was replaced by the Transport Safety Investigation Center. It was affiliated to the Ministry of Transport and Infrastructure.
