= Mehmet Cahit Turhan =

Turkish politician (born 1960)

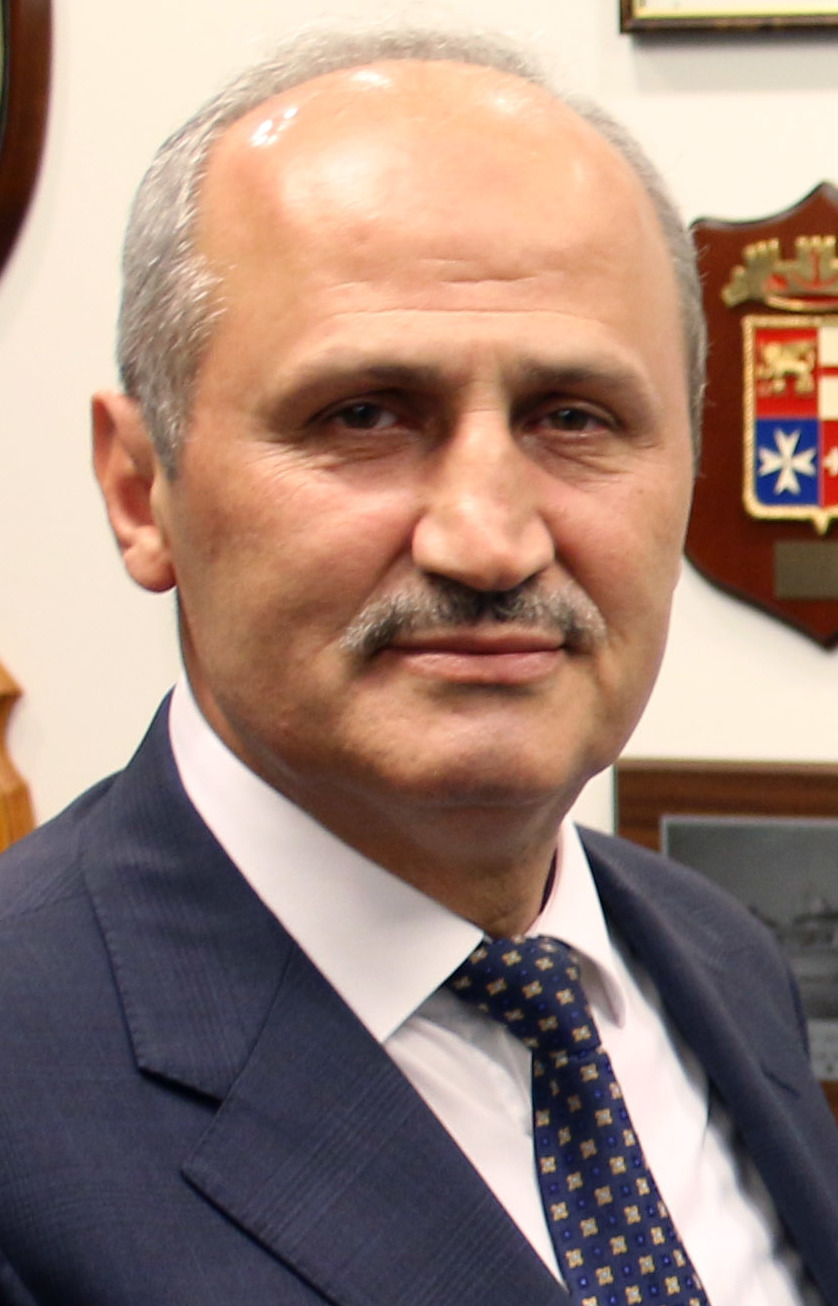

Minister of Transport and Infrastructure
- In office 10 July 2018 – 28 March 2020
- President: Recep Tayyip Erdoğan
- Preceded by: Ahmet Arslan
- Succeeded by: Adil Karaismailoğlu

Personal details
- Born: 29 April 1960 (age 66) Trabzon, Turkey
- Education: Karadeniz Technical University

Mehmet Cahit Turhan (born 29 April 1960) is a Turkish civil engineer, civil servant and former Minister of Transport and Infrastructure.

Mehmet Cahit Turhan was born in Trabzon, northern Turkey on 29 April 1960. In 1981, he graduated from Karadeniz Technical University's Faculty of Civil Engineering and Architecture with a title B.Eng. in Civil Engineering. Later, he earned his M.Eng. title at the same university.

Turhan started his working life in 1985 as an engineer at the Department of Kapıkule-Edirne Motorway of the Turkish Highways Administration (KGM)'s 17th Division. He worked at various positions at the KGM as a civil servant. Between January 2006 and August 2015, he served as director general of the KGM.

In 2015, Turhan was appointed a chief advisor of the President of Turkey. After a brief term at this position, he was appointed a member of the Council of State on 2 October 2015. His term ended at this institution on 23 July 2016. On 10 July 2018, Turhan entered the Cabinet Erdoğan IV as the Minister of Transport and Infrastructure. He was sacked by President Recep Tayyip Erdoğan on 28 March 2020.

Political offices
Preceded by Ahmet Arslan	Minister of Transport and Infrastructure; 10 July 2018 – 28 March 2020	Succeeded by Adil Karaismailoğlu
