= Abdulkadir Uraloğlu =

Turkish politician (born 1966)

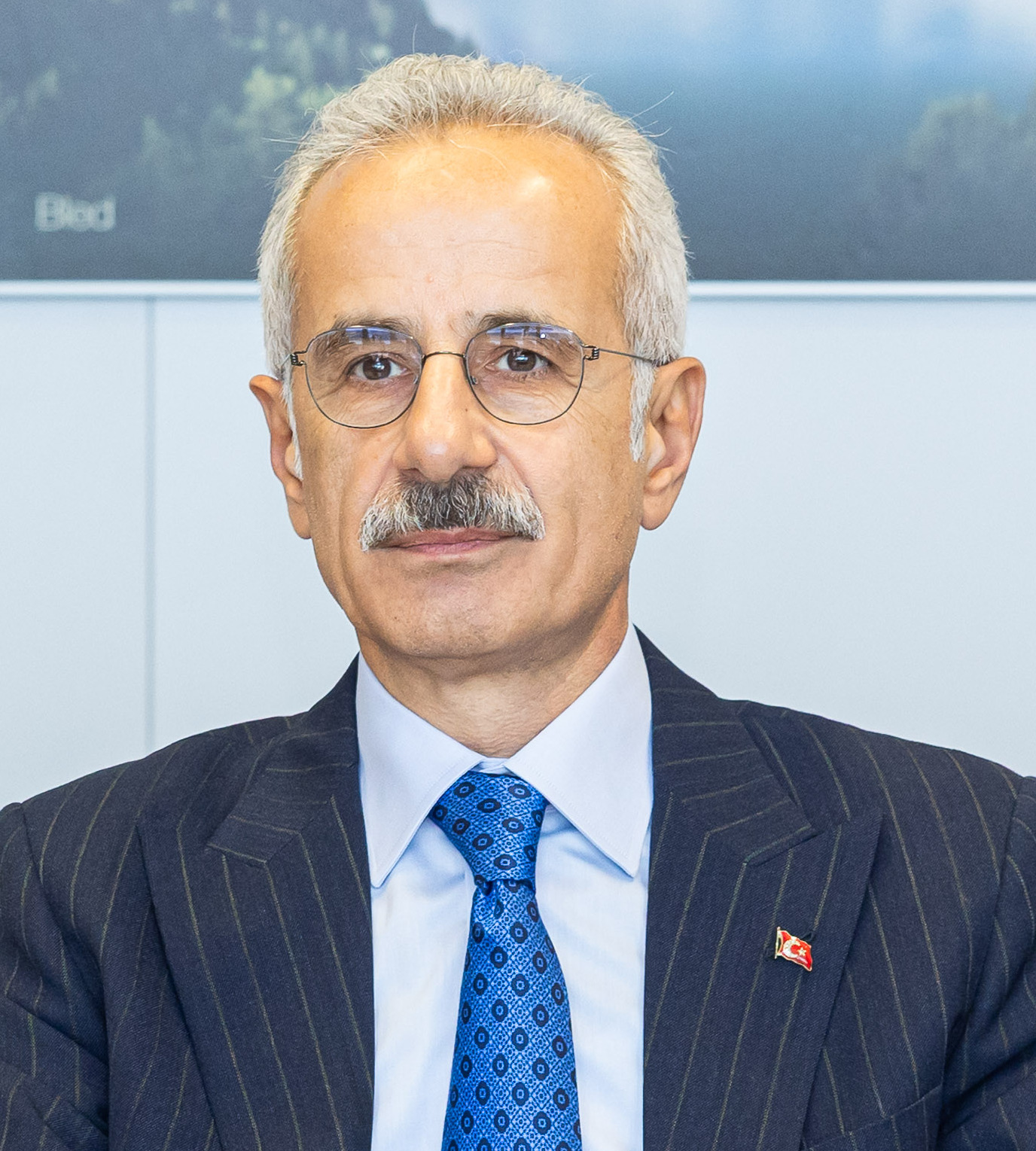
- Uraloğlu in 2026

Minister of Transport and Infrastructure
- Incumbent
- Assumed office 4 June 2023
- President: Recep Tayyip Erdoğan
- Preceded by: Adil Karaismailoğlu

Director General of Highways
- In office 23 July 2018 – 4 June 2023
- Preceded by: İsmail Kartal

Personal details
- Born: 1966 Trabzon, Turkey
- Party: Justice and Development Party
- Education: Karadeniz Technical University
- Occupation: Politician
- Profession: Construction engineer

Abdulkadir Uraloğlu (born 1966) is a Turkish politician, who is serving as the Minister of Transport and Infrastructure since 4 June 2023 in the 67th government of Turkey. He had previously been the head of the General Directorate of Highways.

== Early and personal life ==
Uraloğlu was born in 1966 in Trabzon, Turkey. He is from the Çayırbağı neighborhood in the Düzköy district. He graduated from the Karadeniz Technical University in 1988 with a degree in construction engineering. Following his graduation, he briefly worked as a site engineer in the private sector. Uraloğlu is married and has 3 children.

== Career ==
=== General Directorate of Highways (1989–2023) ===
Uraloğlu joined the General Directorate of Highways (KGM) in 1989 and worked as an engineer at various locations until 2003, when he became the deputy director of KGM in Trabzon. He later became the director of Kayseri, Samsun and briefly Bursa, before being appointed as the İzmir director of the KGM. Uraloğlu left this position in 2015 and became an MP candidate of Trabzon from the Justice and Development Party. After failing to get elected, he returned to the KGM, again as the director of İzmir. In July 2018, he was made the general director of the KGM. In September 2018, he was elected to the supervisory board of Türk Telekom while keeping his position at the KGM. This has led to criticism from left-wing media, who mocked Uraloğlu for having "two salaries".

=== Minister of Transport and Infrastructure (2023–) ===
On 4 June 2023, Uraloğlu was appointed by Recep Tayyip Erdoğan as the Minister of Transport and Infrastructure in the newly elected 67th government of Turkey. The handover ceremony with previous minister Adil Karaismailoğlu happened the next day.

In 2025, Uraloğlu was fined 9,267 Turkish Lira ($225) for posting a video of himself on social media driving with apparent speedometer readings of 190 and 225 kilometres per hour (118 to 140 miles per hour) along a highway near Ankara that had a maximum speed limit of 140 kph (85 mph).

Political offices
Preceded by Adil Karaismailoğlu	Minister of Transport and Infrastructure; 4 June 2023–present	Incumbent
