= Mehmet Muş =

Turkish politician and economist

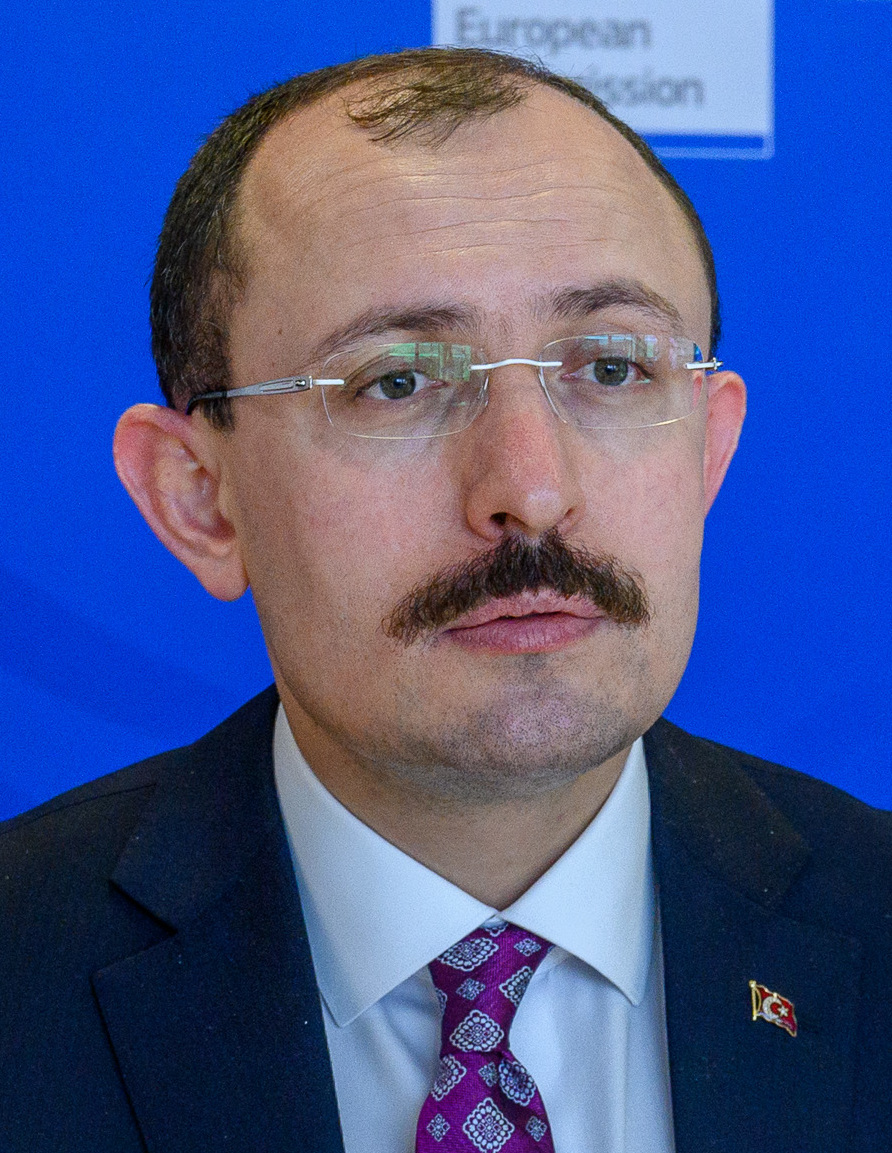

Minister of Trade
- In office 21 April 2021 – 4 June 2023
- President: Recep Tayyip Erdoğan
- Preceded by: Ruhsar Pekcan
- Succeeded by: Ömer Bolat

Personal details
- Born: 1 May 1982 (age 44) Trabzon, Turkey
- Party: Justice and Development Party
- Education: Eastern Mediterranean University

Mehmet Muş (born 1 May 1982) is a Turkish politician and economist, who was a Deputy in the Turkish Parliament for Istanbul and has represented Samsun since the 2023 Turkish parliamentary election. He also served as the Turkish Minister of Trade from 2021 to 2023.

Preceded by Ruhsar Pekcan	Ministry of Trade (Turkey); 21 April 2021–4 June 2023	Succeeded by Ömer Bolat
