= Ruhsar Pekcan =

Turkish politician and electrical engineer

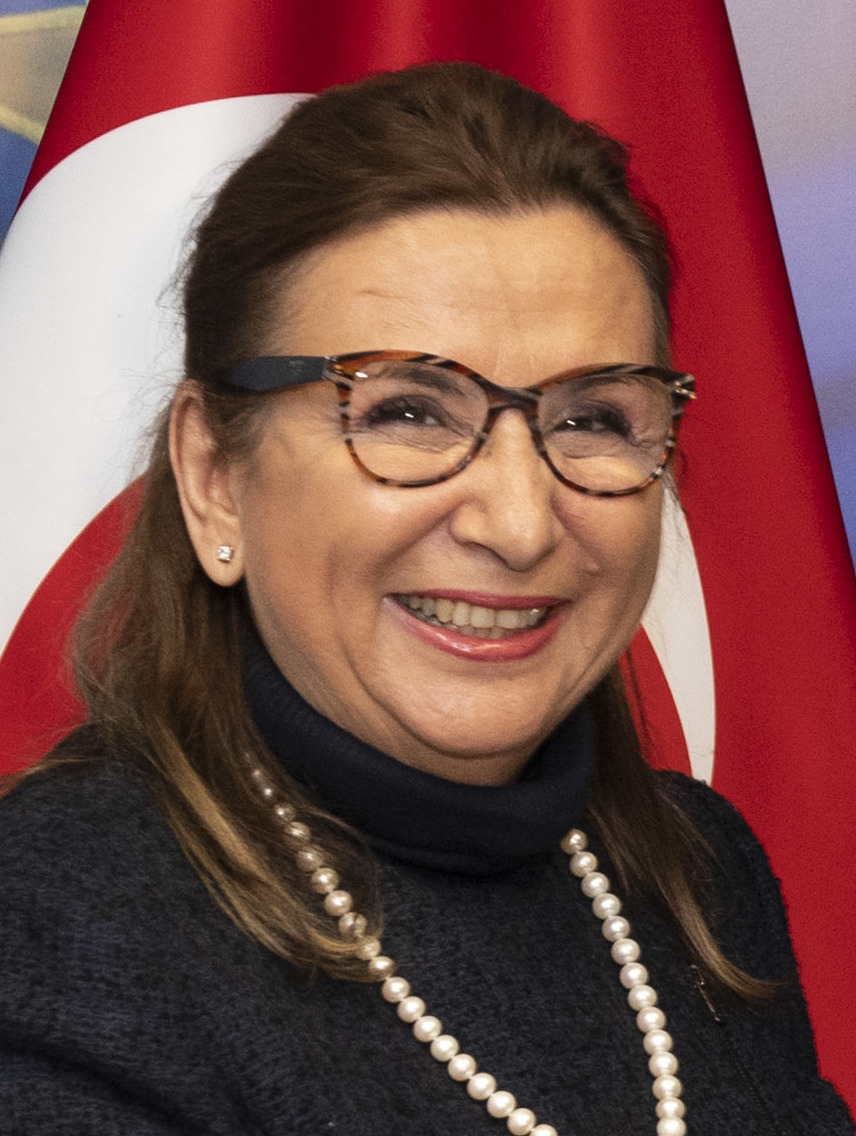

Minister of Trade
- In office 10 July 2018 – 21 April 2021
- President: Recep Tayyip Erdoğan
- Preceded by: Bülent Tüfenkci
- Succeeded by: Mehmet Muş

Personal details
- Born: 1958 (age 67–68) Manisa, Turkey
- Citizenship: Turkey
- Children: 2
- Education: Electrical engineering
- Alma mater: Istanbul Technical University

Ruhsar Pekcan (born 1958) is a politician and electrical engineer who served as the Minister of Trade of Turkey between 2018 and 2021.

== Professional career ==
Pekcan started her professional career joining the development and investment bank (Turkish: Türkiye Sınai Kalkınma Bankası). After working at different positions in several companies, she became a member of executive boards. In 2005, she co-founded an engineering company, which supplies pipelines for drinking water, irrigation, petroleum and natural gas. She was the managing director of the company.

She was chairperson of the Turkey-Syria business councils of the Turkish Foreign Economic Relations Corporation (Turkish: Dış Ekonomik İlişkiler Kurumu, DEİK) on three occasions. She served as the chairperson of the Turkey-Jordan business council, and as a member of the executive boards of the Turkey-Iraq and Turkey-Libya business councils of the same corporation. She served as deputy chairperson of the women entrepreneurs committee at the Union of Chambers and Commodity Exchanges of Turkey (TOBB), and as a member of women entrepreneurs committee at the Istanbul Chamber of Commerce (İTO) as well as some other business organizations.

Pekcan is recipient of the IWEC 2010 Award, and she was named Global Ambassador of IWEC.

== Political career ==
On 9 July 2018, the newly elected President of Turkey Recep Tayyip Erdoğan announced his cabinet of the new Turkish political system. Ruhsar Pekcan was appointed Minister of Trade. On 16 April 2021, it was claimed that Ruhsar Pekcan sold disinfectants to her ministry from the company which she owned with her husband in 2020. Some opposite politicians also asked to Ruhsar Pekcan about these claims. On 20 April 2021, the Ministry of Trade confirmed the purchases but stated the amounts was less. She was succeeded by AKP's parliamentary group chairman Mehmet Muş on 21 April 2021.

== Private life ==
Ruhsar Pekcan was born in Manisa, Turkey in 1958. She was educated in electrical engineering at Istanbul Technical University. Following her bachelor's degree, she obtained a master's degree from the same faculty.

She is married with two children.

Political offices
Preceded by Bülent Tüfenkci	Minister of Trade; July 10, 2018–April 21, 2021	Succeeded by Mehmet Muş
