= Bekir Pakdemirli =

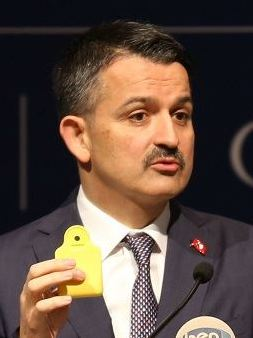

Minister of Agriculture and Forestry
- In office 10 July 2018 – 4 March 2022
- President: Recep Tayyip Erdoğan
- Preceded by: Veysel Eroğlu
- Succeeded by: Vahit Kirişci

Personal details
- Born: November 10, 1973 (age 52) İzmir, Turkey
- Relations: Ekrem Pakdemirli (father)
- Education: Bilkent University; Baskent University; Manisa Celal Bayar University

Bekir Pakdemirli (born 1973) is a Turkish businessman and former Minister of Agriculture and Forestry.

== Early years ==
Bekir Pakdemirli was born at İzmir, Turkey in 1973. His father Ekrem Pakdemirli was a politician, who briefly served as a Deputy Prime Minister in 1991. He studied Business administration at Bilkent University. After receiving his bachelor's degree, he continued his education at Başkent University graduating with a Master of Business Administration title. Later, he earned a doctoral degree from Celal Bayar University.

== Career ==
After completion of his education, Pakdemirli worked as an entrepreneur in the fields of food, agriculture, animal husbandry, technology and automotive. He co-founded and managed various companies. He served as general manager of a major company and a publicly-held food corporation. Following his senior management position in an international food company, he also worked as a consultant in the same company. He was a board member at the mobile network operator Turkcell, the discount store chain BİM and the bank Albaraka Türk.

Between 2018 and 2022, Pakdemirli served as minister of Agriculture and Forestry in the Fourth cabinet of Erdoğan.

== Private life ==
In his private life, Pakdemirli was active in social responsibility projects holding posts in a number of associations and foundations. He owns licenses of sea captain, aprivate aviation pilot and amateur radio operator.

Political offices
Preceded by Veysel Eroğlu	Minister of Agriculture and Forestry; 10 July 2018 – 4 March 2022	Succeeded by Vahit Kirişçi
