= Transport Safety Investigation Center =

Civil transportation accident investigation board of Turkey

Transport Safety Investigation Center (Turkish: Ulaşım Emniyeti İnceleme Merkezi), is a civil transportation accident investigation board of Turkey. It is affiliated to the Ministry of Transport and Infrastructure. Founded in 2019, it replaced the Accident Investigation Board.
