= Mustafa Kemal Atatürk Monument, Santiago =

Monument dedicated to Atatürk in Santiago, Chile

Mustafa Kemal Atatürk Monument
- Monumento a Mustafa Kemal Atatürk
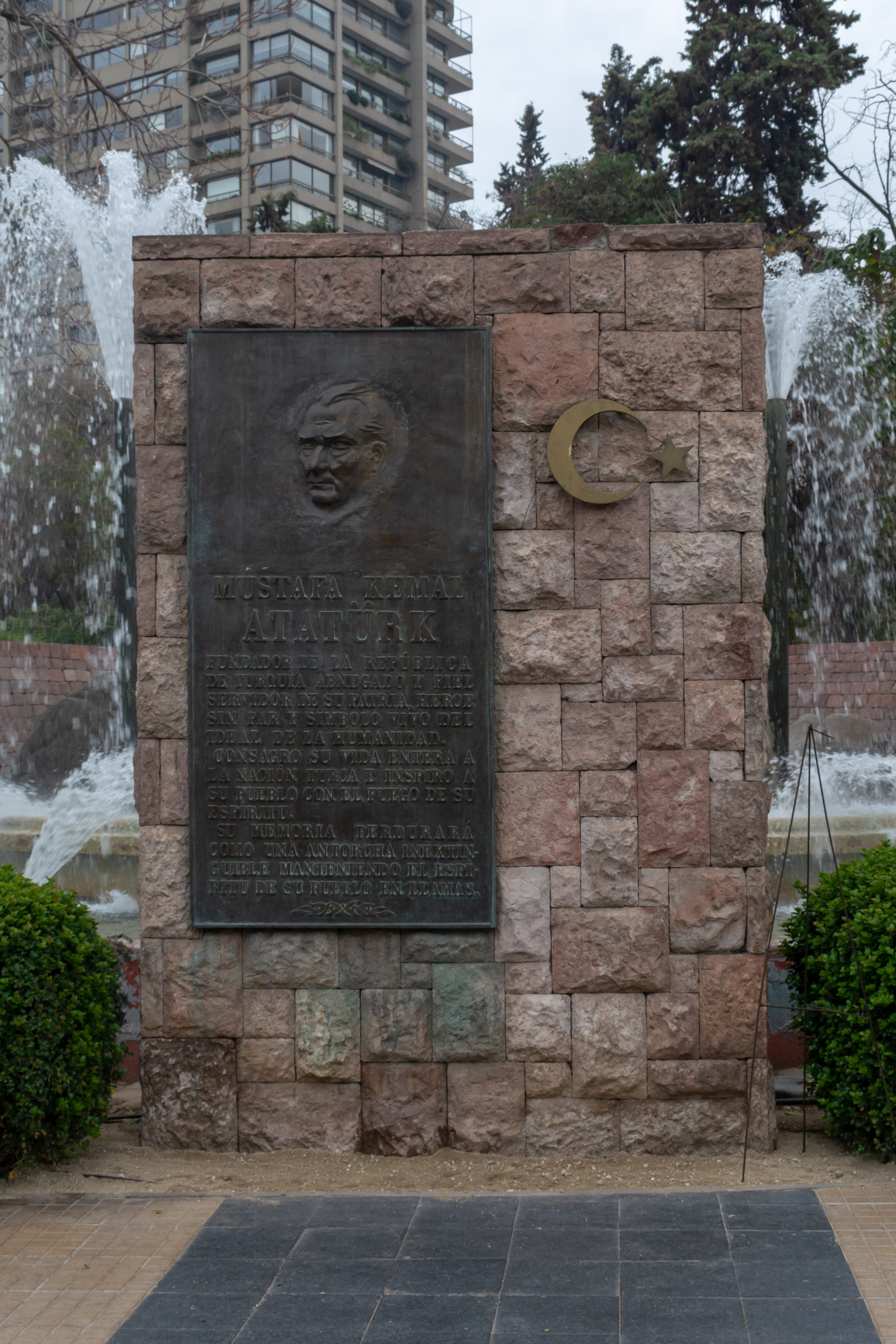
- Mustafa Kemal Atatürk Monument in Santiago (May 2022)
- Interactive map of Mustafa Kemal Atatürk Monument
- Location: Apoquindo Avenue, Las Condes, Santiago, Chile
- Coordinates: 33°24′53″S 70°35′14″W
- Designer: M. Şadi Çalık
- Type: Memorial
- Length: 3.90 m
- Width: 2 m
- Opening date: 29 October 1973
- Dedicated to: Mustafa Kemal Atatürk

Mustafa Kemal Atatürk Monument (Spanish: Monumento a Mustafa Kemal Atatürk) is a monument located at Mustafa Kemal Atatürk Plaza on Apoquindo Avenue in Chile's capital, Santiago.

== Description ==
The Atatürk monument, which is 3.90 meters long and 2 meters wide, is a cast bronze relief known as an "effigy." The monument's base features a relief depiction of Atatürk on a bronze plaque. It was created by Turkish sculptor M. Şadi Çalık. The monument features a Spanish inscription inspired by the words of İsmet İnönü that highlights Atatürk's characteristics; its English translation is as follows:

Mustafa Kemal Atatürk
Founder of the Republic of Turkey. Selfless and faithful servant of his homeland. Unparalleled hero and living symbol of the ideal of humanity.
He consecrated his entire life to the Turkish nation and inspired his people with the fire of his spirit.
His memory will endure like an inextinguishable torch, keeping the spirit of his people aflame.

== History ==
The Atatürk monument was ceremonially unveiled on 29 October 1973, the 50th anniversary of the proclamation of the Republic of Turkey, in Cerro Navidad Park on Apoquindo Avenue within the boundaries of the Las Condes Municipality, following a decision made by the Las Condes Municipal Council on 4 June 1973.

On 7 January 1975, the area surrounding the monument was paved with stones resembling colorful andesite by the Turkish Embassy.

In 1981, during the park's renovation and the construction of a pond, the monument's location was slightly altered to face the boulevard.
