= Süleyman Soylu =

Turkish politician (born 1969)

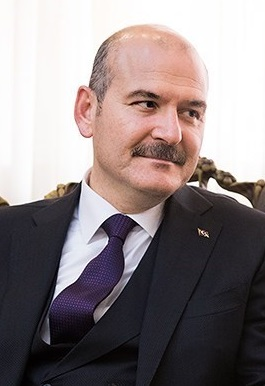

Minister of the Interior
- In office 31 August 2016 – 4 June 2023
- President: Recep Tayyip Erdoğan
- Prime Minister: Binali Yıldırım
- Preceded by: Efkan Ala
- Succeeded by: Ali Yerlikaya

Minister of Labour and Social Security
- In office 24 November 2015 – 31 August 2016
- Prime Minister: Ahmet Davutoğlu; Binali Yıldırım
- Preceded by: Ahmet Erdem
- Succeeded by: Mehmet Müezzinoğlu

Deputy Leader of the Justice and Development Party
- Incumbent
- Assumed office 30 September 2012
- Leader: Recep Tayyip Erdoğan; Ahmet Davutoğlu; Binali Yıldırım

Member of the Grand National Assembly
- Incumbent
- Assumed office 2 June 2023
- Constituency: Istanbul (II) (2023)
- In office 7 June 2015 – 7 July 2018
- Constituency: Trabzon (June 2015, Nov 2015)
- In office 7 July 2018 – 10 July 2018
- Constituency: Istanbul (II) (2018)

Leader of the Democrat Party
- In office 6 January 2008 – 16 May 2009
- Preceded by: Mehmet Ağar
- Succeeded by: Hüsamettin Cindoruk

Personal details
- Born: 21 November 1969 (age 56) Istanbul, Turkey
- Party: True Path Party (1987–2007); Democrat Party (2007–2010); Justice and Development Party (2012–present)
- Spouse: Hamdiye Soylu
- Children: 2
- Cabinet: 64th, 65th
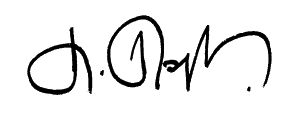
- Signature
- Website: suleymansoylu.com

Süleyman Soylu (Turkish: [sylɛjman sojˈɫu]; born 21 November 1969) is a Turkish politician. He is a deputy chairman of the Justice and Development Party. He previously served as the Minister of Labour and Social Security from November 2015 to August 2016 and the Minister of the Interior from August 2016 to June 2023. He is a former leader of the Democrat Party (DP).

Soylu was appointed as the Interior Minister after the surprise resignation of Efkan Ala, with Soylu commenting that his appointment 'came as a surprise' to him as well.

Soylu was known for his divisive style, often accusing the opposition of "siding with terrorists" and imposing restrictive measures on opposition-controlled municipalities. His re-appointment as Interior Minister after Erdoğan's election victory in 2018 was protested by opposition parties, whose MPs turned their backs as Soylu took the oath of office in Parliament. He removed large numbers of Peoples' Democratic Party (HDP) mayors and officials from their offices due to alleged affiliation with the Kurdistan Workers' Party (PKK), replacing ousted mayors with Ankara-appointed trustees. While these actions have received positive responses from some nationalist politicians, opposition parties and human rights groups have condemned the removals. He is seen as possible successor as leader of AK Party and president Erdogan.

== Early life and business career ==
Süleyman Soylu was born in Istanbul on 21 November 1969. He graduated from Istanbul University Faculty of Management. He started business career in Istanbul Stock Exchange in 1990. In 1996 he established the insurance company "Engin Insurance and Mediation Services". In January 2021 he and his son Levent Soylu founded "Esigortan Insurance Agency Services", a new insurance company.

== Political career ==
=== Democrat Party ===
He started politics at Democrat Party (DP) Istanbul Youth Branch in 1987. He took the positions of member of board of directorates, and chairman of the organization at youth branch of Democrat Party Istanbul.

In 1995, he was elected to the board of directorates in Gaziosmanpaşa branch, and with the congress held on 17 July 1995, he was elected as the chairman of the district at the age of 25. On 18 April 1999, he announced his candidacy for the mayor of Gaziosmanpaşa municipality which is district of Istanbul.

He became DP Istanbul Chairman on 29 April 1999 which made him the youngest chairman in the Turkey at that time. He resigned from the presidency, which lasted 3.5 years, to run for the elections to become a Member of the Parliament of Turkey in 2002. Süleyman Soylu was elected for party leadership with the 4th Extraordinary Congress of Democrat Party on 6 January 2008. After being reelected for the leadership at the 9th Statutory Congress on 15 November 2008, he led his party for 29 March 2009 local elections. On 16 May 2009, at the congress, which took place according to his will, his party leadership ended.

Afterwards, he participated in many conferences and panels upon invitations coming from various universities and civil societies all over the country.

Süleyman Soylu realized the vital importance of the change of constitution package, which was opened for referendum of 12 September 2010 for the transition and democratization of Turkey, organized a series of seminars with the title of “Democracy meetings”, and together with his friends by travelling all around Turkey, shared grounds for voting “yes”. Following these activities, he was expelled from his party.

=== Justice and Development Party ===
Soylu was invited to be an AKP politician by Recep Tayyip Erdoğan, then AKP Chairman and Prime Minister. Soylu joined the AKP on 5 September 2012. On 30 September 2012, with the 4th Statutory General Congress of AKP, he was elected for the Central Board of Executives, and became Deputy Chairman responsible for R&D Department.

He served as 'Minister of Labour and Social Security' in the third Davutoğlu Cabinet (24 November 2015 – 24 May 2016) and in the Yıldırım Cabinet until 31 August 2016. Then, PM Yıldırım surprisingly appointed him Minister of the Interior after he had sacked Efkan Ala.

==== Resignation from the Ministry ====
On 10 April 2020, the Turkish government announced that a 48-hour curfew would be imposed in 31 cities due to the coronavirus pandemic. It was announced approximately 2 or 3 hours before the start of the curfew and caused panic buying. On 12 April 2020, Soylu announced his resignation, saying he was responsible for the chaos. However, President Recep Tayyip Erdoğan rejected his resignation request. Before Erdoğan's rejection of the resignation, the hashtag "We don't accept the resignation,” #İstifayıKabulEtmiyoruz, quickly became a top trend on Twitter following the resignation of Soylu, a ruling Justice and Development Party (AKP) favourite among supporters.

==== Conflict of Sedat Peker & Suleyman Soylu ====
In 2021, crime leader Sedat Peker claimed that cocaine trafficking from Colombia to Turkey involved interior minister Süleyman Soylu and the son of former prime minister Binali Yıldırım. Süleyman Soylu was also blamed for providing thousands of guns to some civilian groups with SADAT during 2016 Turkish coup d'état attempt. Peker also invited the public prosecutor to search for details to sue him.

==== Removal of HDP officials ====
As Interior Minister, Soylu has replaced at least 45 out of 65 mayors from municipalities won by the pro-Kurdish Peoples' Democratic Party (HDP) in the 2019 local elections with Ankara-appointed trustees over alleged affiliation with the Kurdistan Workers' Party (PKK). At least 21 of these mayors were jailed. Later in February 2021, Soylu had more than 700 HDP district and provincial chairpersons arrested. These actions received positive responses from some nationalist politicians including Devlet Bahçeli of the Nationalist Movement Party (MHP), but inspired condemnation from members of the opposition Republican People's Party (CHP) and human rights groups, with Human Rights Watch describing charges leveled against HDP officials as "trumped up" and "politically motivated". After Istanbul mayor Ekrem İmamoğlu visited some of the jailed mayors, Soylu defended the arrests by saying "they’ve never denied, to this day, having a connection to the PKK", and threatened to "ruin" İmamoğlu if he continued "busying [himself] with other affairs".

== Korkmaz controversy ==
He used a business jet owned by Sezgin Baran Korkmaz airline Borajet during the Constitutional Referendum in 2017. This was reported after he was accused of having warned Korkmaz to leave Turkey before he was apprehended.

== Views ==
In March 2026, Süleyman Soylu stated that if Israel were to act against Turkey in a similar way to its actions in other parts of the Middle East, the outcome would be Israel's annihilation. He declared: "We may lose 300–400 thousand martyrs, but with God's permission, there will be no country called Israel left."

In March 2017, Soylu threatened European countries with migration, by stating: "If you want, we'll send the 15,000 refugees to you that we don't send each month and blow your mind.".

Political offices
Preceded by Ahmet Erdem	Ministry of Labour and Social Security; 24 November 2015 – 31 August 2016	Succeeded by Mehmet Müezzinoğlu
Preceded by Efkan Ala	Ministry of the Interior; 31 August 2016 – 4 June 2023	Succeeded by Ali Yerlikaya
