= Vedat Bilgin =

Turkish politician (born 1954)

Vedat Bilgin MP
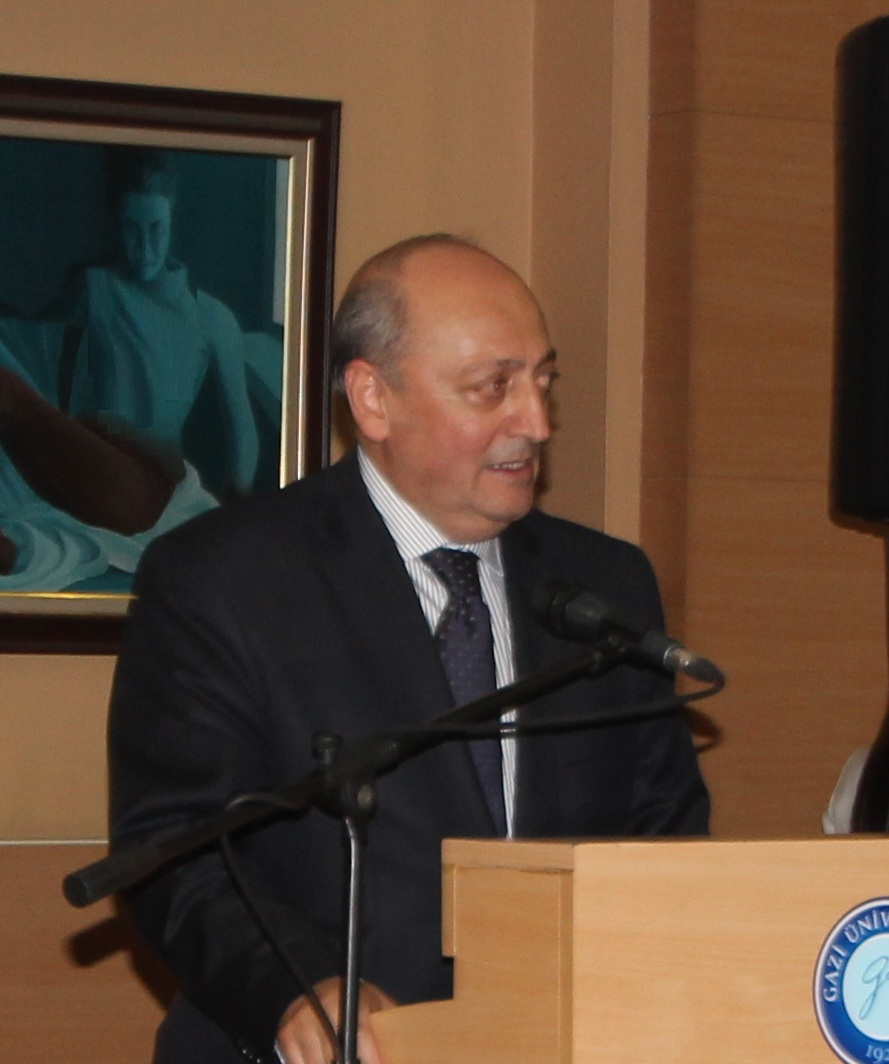
- A photo of Vedat Bilgin

Minister of Labour and Social Security
- In office 21 April 2021 – 4 June 2023
- President: Recep Tayyip Erdoğan
- Preceded by: Zehra Zümrüt Selçuk
- Succeeded by: Vedat Işıkhan

Member of the Grand National Assembly
- Incumbent
- Assumed office 2 June 2023
- In office 23 June 2015 – 2 June 2018
- Constituency: Ankara (II) (June 2015, Nov 2015) (2023)

Personal details
- Born: 22 September 1954 (age 71) Bayburt, Turkey
- Party: Justice and Development Party
- Education: Hacettepe University
- Profession: Sociologist, academic, bureaucrat, writer, politician
- Cabinet: 66th

Vedat Bilgin (born 22 September 1954) is a Turkish sociologist, academic, bureaucrat, writer and former Turkish Minister of Labor and Social Security.

== Academic life ==
Born in Aydıntepe, Bayburt on September 22, 1954, Vedat Bilgin completed his primary and secondary education in the same city. He entered Hacettepe University's Faculty of Social and Administrative Sciences in 1974. After completing his undergraduate education, he did postgraduate and doctoral studies at the Faculty of Economics of Istanbul University. He published the Genç Arkadaş Magazine for the first time while he was a university student. In 1982, he passed the assistantship exam and went to Selçuk University. He also worked at the Faculty of Economics and Administrative Sciences of Gazi University. During his time here, he also functioned as a lecturer. In 1995, he did post-doctoral work at University of York in England.

After being advisor to the prime minister in 2000 he became the general manager of Turkish State Railways. In 2003, he left this position and returned to his job at the university. He was a visiting professor at the University of Michigan in 2006.

Bilgin continued his academic life as the Head of Labor Economics Department at Gazi University from 2011 to 2015. He also served as the advisor to prime minister Ahmet Davutoğlu between 2014 and 2015.

== Political career ==
Vedat Bilgin entered the parliament as the Justice and Development Party (AK Party) Ankara deputy in the June 2015 Turkish general election after resigning from his duty as the chief advisor to MHP leader Devlet Bahçeli; he was re-elected as the AK Party Ankara second regional deputy in the November 2015 Turkish general election. He is also a member of the parliaments Human Rights Investigation Commission.

In 2021 Bilgin became the Turkish Minister of Labor and Social Security.

Political offices
Preceded by Zehra Zümrüt Selçuk	Minister of Labour and Social Security; 21 April 2021 – 4 June 2023	Succeeded by Vedat Işıkhan
