= İbrahim Yumaklı =

Turkish bureaucrat (born 1969)

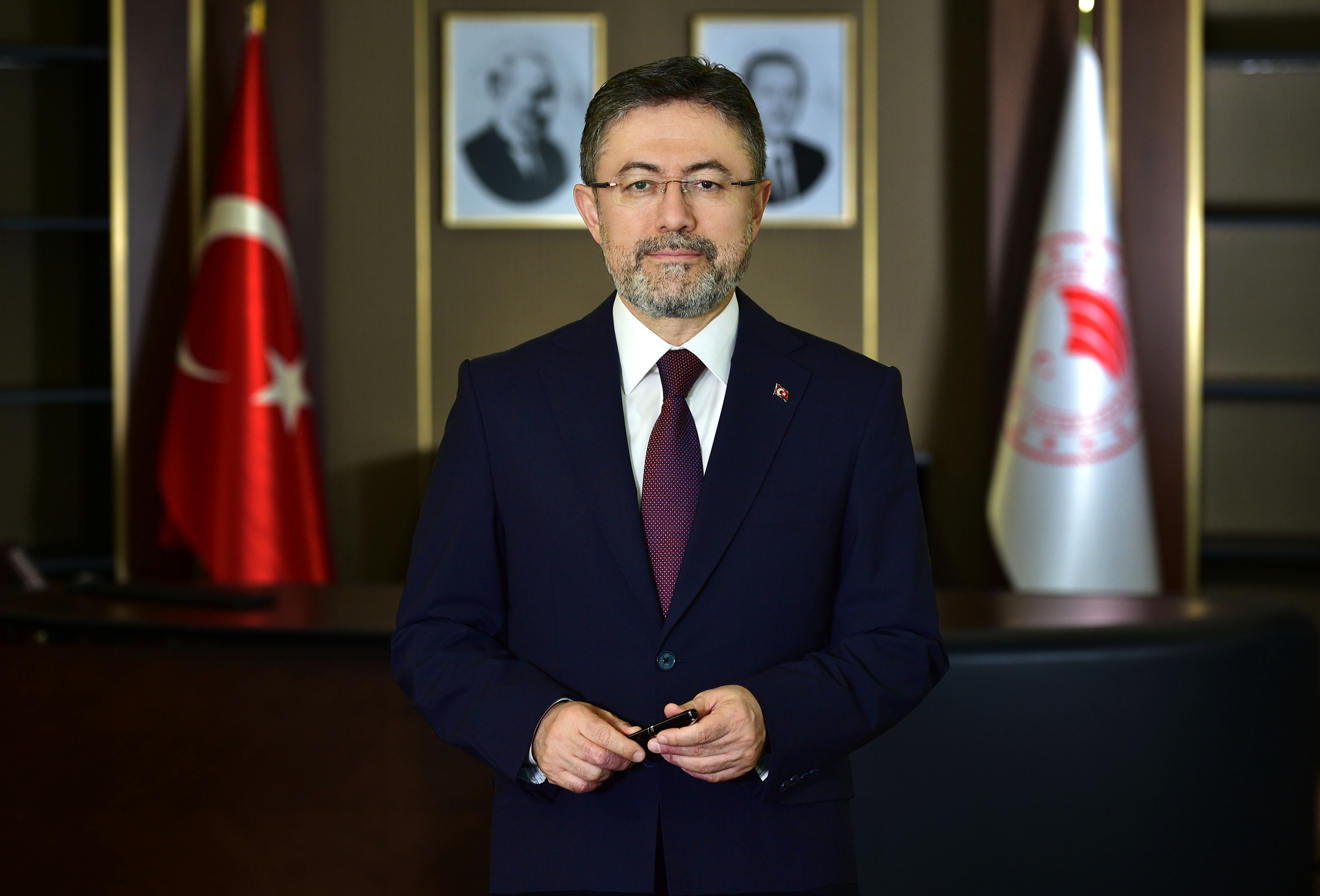
- Yumaklı in 2023

Minister of Agriculture and Forestry
- Incumbent
- Assumed office 4 June 2023
- President: Recep Tayyip Erdoğan
- Preceded by: Vahit Kirişci

Personal details
- Born: 1969 (age 56–57) Kastamonu, Turkey
- Education: Uludağ University

İbrahim Yumaklı (born 1969) is a Turkish bureaucrat who currently serves as the Minister of Agriculture and Forestry. He was at one time the general manager of Gübretaş.
