= Ömer Bolat =

Turkish politician (born 1963)

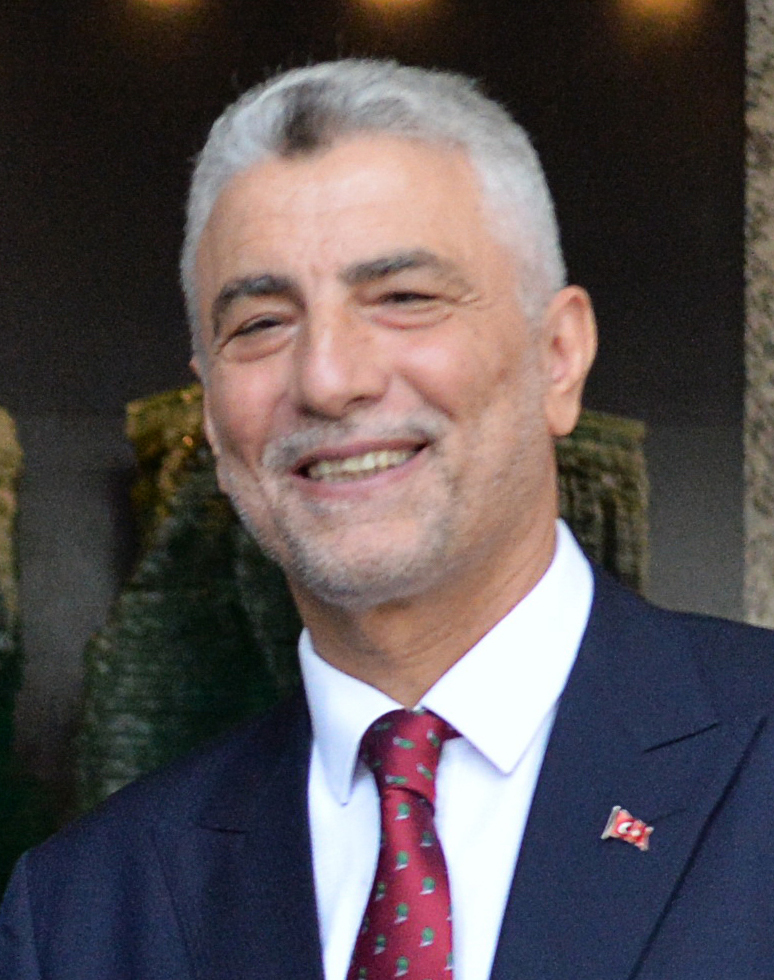
- Bolat in 2023

Minister of Trade
- Incumbent
- Assumed office 4 June 2023
- President: Recep Tayyip Erdoğan
- Preceded by: Mehmet Muş

Personal details
- Born: 30 August 1963 (age 63) Istanbul, Turkey
- Citizenship: Turkish
- Education: Marmara University; University of Amsterdam; Kiel Institute for the World Economy
- Cabinet: 67th

Ömer Bolat (born 30 August 1963) is a Turkish academician and politician. Bolat became the minister of trade of the 67th cabinet of Turkey in 2023.

== Education ==
In 1984, Bolat graduated from the Marmara University Faculty of Economics and Administrative Sciences, specializing in International Economic Relations. He completed his post-graduate education at University of Amsterdam, and later earned a master's degree from the Kiel Institute for the World Economy in Germany, specialising in International Economy and Business Administration. Bolat then obtained his doctorate from the Marmara University Institute of European Studies.

== Academic career ==
Between September 2015 and September 2020, Ömer Bolat conducted post-graduate courses in International Economy, Administration, Business Administration, and Entrepreneurship at Istanbul Sabahattin Zaim University. On October 1, 2020, he assumed the role of an academic member at Istanbul Commerce University, where he taught courses on "Entrepreneurship and New Business Models" and "Leadership Theories."

His academic output includes nearly 30 reports, four books, and over 300 articles.

== Professional experience ==
Bolat served as a researcher at the Economic Development Foundation from 1982 to 1993. In 1993, he became the Secretary General of the Independent Industrialists and Businessmen Association (MUSİAD). He also held the positions of Deputy President and President during his 15-year tenure on the MUSİAD Board of Directors.

He served as the General Coordinator of Albayrak Group for 23 years, from May 2000 to June 2023. continues to contribute as a senior executive and columnist at Derin Ekonomi magazine since June 2015 and Z-Raporu economy magazine since June 2019. He also served as a member of the Board of Directors of the Turkish Aerospace Industries.

== Political engagement ==
Bolat actively engaged in politics and held several important positions within the Justice and Development Party (AK Party). He served as a member of the Central Decision and Administrative Committee (CDAC) for three years between September 2012 and September 2015. Additionally, he contributed to the AK Party Political Virtue and Ethics Committee between 2015 and 2016.

In 2023, Bolat was appointed as the Minister of Trade by President Recep Tayyip Erdoğan.

Preceded by Mehmet Muş	Minister of Trade; 4 June 2023–present	Succeeded by Incumbent
