= Ömer Dinçer =

Turkish politician (born 1956)

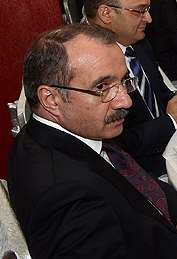

Minister of National Education
- In office 6 July 2011 – 24 January 2013
- Prime Minister: Recep Tayyip Erdoğan
- Preceded by: Nimet Çubukçu
- Succeeded by: Nabi Avcı

Minister of Labor and Social Security
- In office 1 May 2009 – 6 July 2011
- Prime Minister: Recep Tayyip Erdoğan
- Preceded by: Faruk Çelik
- Succeeded by: Faruk Çelik

Personal details
- Born: 10 September 1956 (age 69) Karaman, Turkey
- Party: Justice and Development Party (AKP)
- Education: Atatürk University; Istanbul University
- Occupation: Politician, akademician

Ömer Dinçer (born 10 September 1956 in Karaman) is a Turkish politician and academic. Before becoming a member of the Turkish parliament, he taught at Marmara University for years and published many papers in his field.

== Early life and career ==
Ömer Dinçer was born on 10 September 1956 in Karaman, to Duran Ahmet Bey and Ayşe Hanım. He completed his primary, secondary and high school education in Karaman. He graduated from the Atatürk University Faculty of Business Administration. He completed a master's degree at the Istanbul University Faculty of Business Administration in 1980 and a doctoral degree in 1984. In 1980, he began working as an assistant at the Faculty of Economics and Administrative Sciences of Marmara University.

He became an associate professor in 1988 and a professor in 1994. During his tenure at the university, he taught courses and seminars, conducted research, and wrote articles and books in his areas of specialization, including Strategic Management, Management and Organization, and Change Management and Organizational Development. He was also the subject of plagiarism allegations, which he acknowledged and for which he apologized. He also served as head of the Department of Local Governments and Decentralization, as well as on the university's governing boards and in various administrative positions.

Between 1994 and 1997, alongside his university duties, Dinçer served as a chief adviser to the Istanbul Metropolitan Municipality. From 1999 to 2003, he held several positions at Beykent University, including Deputy Rector, Dean of the Faculty of Economics and Administrative Sciences, and Director of the Institute of Social Sciences. On 11 April 2003, he was appointed Chief Adviser to the Prime Minister, and on 21 October 2003 he became Undersecretary of the Prime Ministry. Dinçer is married, has three children, and speaks English.

On 21 October 2005, Council of Higher Education of Turkey (YÖK) identified extensive plagiarism in his academic book Introduction to Business Administration and expelled Dinçer from teaching profession at any university in Turkey. Dinçer appealed the charge, but it was upheld in court.

In the elections of 2007 Dinçer was elected as a member of parliament. On 1 May 2009 he was appointed as Minister of Labor and Social Security in the second cabinet of Erdoğan. On 6 July 2011 he was appointed as Minister of National Education in the third cabinet of Erdoğan. Same year, Council of Higher Education of Turkey had quietly cleared Dinçer to the dismay of many academics. The council confirmed that it had withdrawn the charges, but did not provide any particular reasons.

On 24 January 2013, he was replaced by Nabi Avcı from his post.

Political offices
| Preceded by Faruk Çelik | Minister of Labor and Social Security; 1 May 2009 – 6 July 2011 | Succeeded by Faruk Çelik |
| Preceded by Nimet Çubukçu | Minister of National Education; 6 July 2011 – 24 January 2013 | Succeeded by Nabi Avcı |
