= Vedat Işıkhan =

Turkish politician (born 1966)

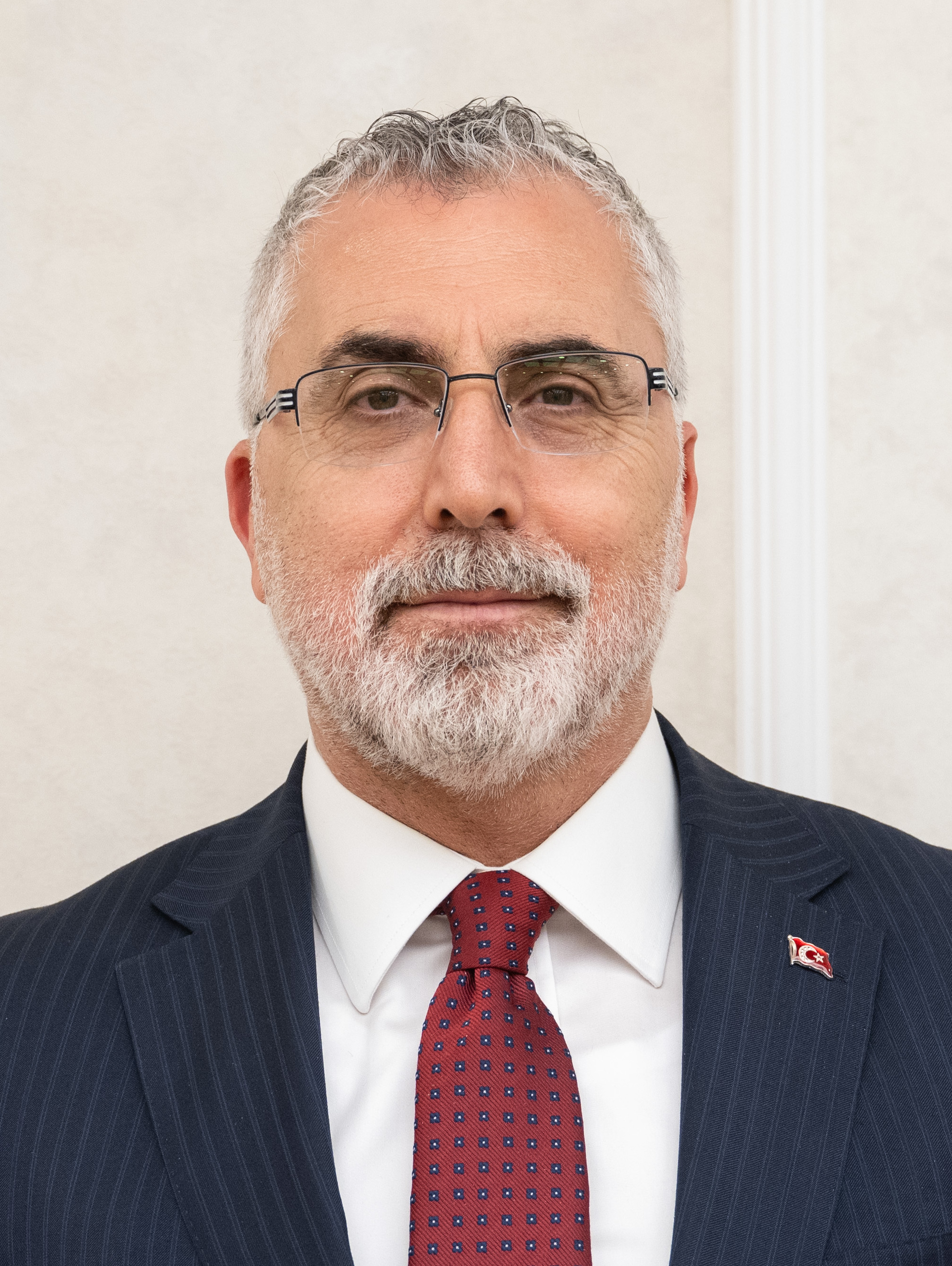
- Işıkhan in 2023

Minister of Labour and Social Security
- Incumbent
- Assumed office 4 June 2023
- President: Recep Tayyip Erdogan
- Preceded by: Vedat Bilgin

Personal details
- Born: 20 January 1966 (age 60) Mardin, Turkey
- Party: AK Party
- Education: Hacettepe University (BA, MA, PhD)
- Occupation: Politician

Vedat Işıkhan (born 20 January 1966) is a Turkish politician and professor. He is the minister of labour and social security of Turkey. He was born in Artuklu, Mardin into an ethnically Kurdish family.

== Education ==
Işıkhan received all of his primary and secondary education in Izmir, the proceeded to earn a bachelor’s degree, master’s degree, a PhD from Hacettepe University. In 2009, Işıkhan received his professorship title having become an associate professor in 2003. His specialities were on stress management, social works, and social policies.

== Career ==
In 2012, Işıkhan was the coordinator for the ministry of family and social policies ASDEP program. Between 2015 and 2018, Işıkhan served as AK party’s presidential academic adviser on social policies. He was then appointed to the presidential social policies board on 8 October 2018.

Işıkhan started his career as a social work departmental staff, Faculty of economics and administrative sciences at Hacettepe University. He headed the department for 3 years after working as the deputy director of the University’s family services application centre, He also served as the deputy dean of the faculty.

Işıkhan became the deputy chairman of the presidential social policy board on 17 December 2021, and continues to be a faculty staff member at Hacettepe University.

Following President Erdogan’s victory at the 2023 Turkey presidential elections, Işıkhan was appointed minister of labor and social security. He succeeded Vedat Bilgin in the post.
