= Mustafa Kemal Atatürk Plaza (Santiago) =

Square in Santiago, Chile

- City square
- Plaza Mustafa Kemal Atatürk (Spanish)
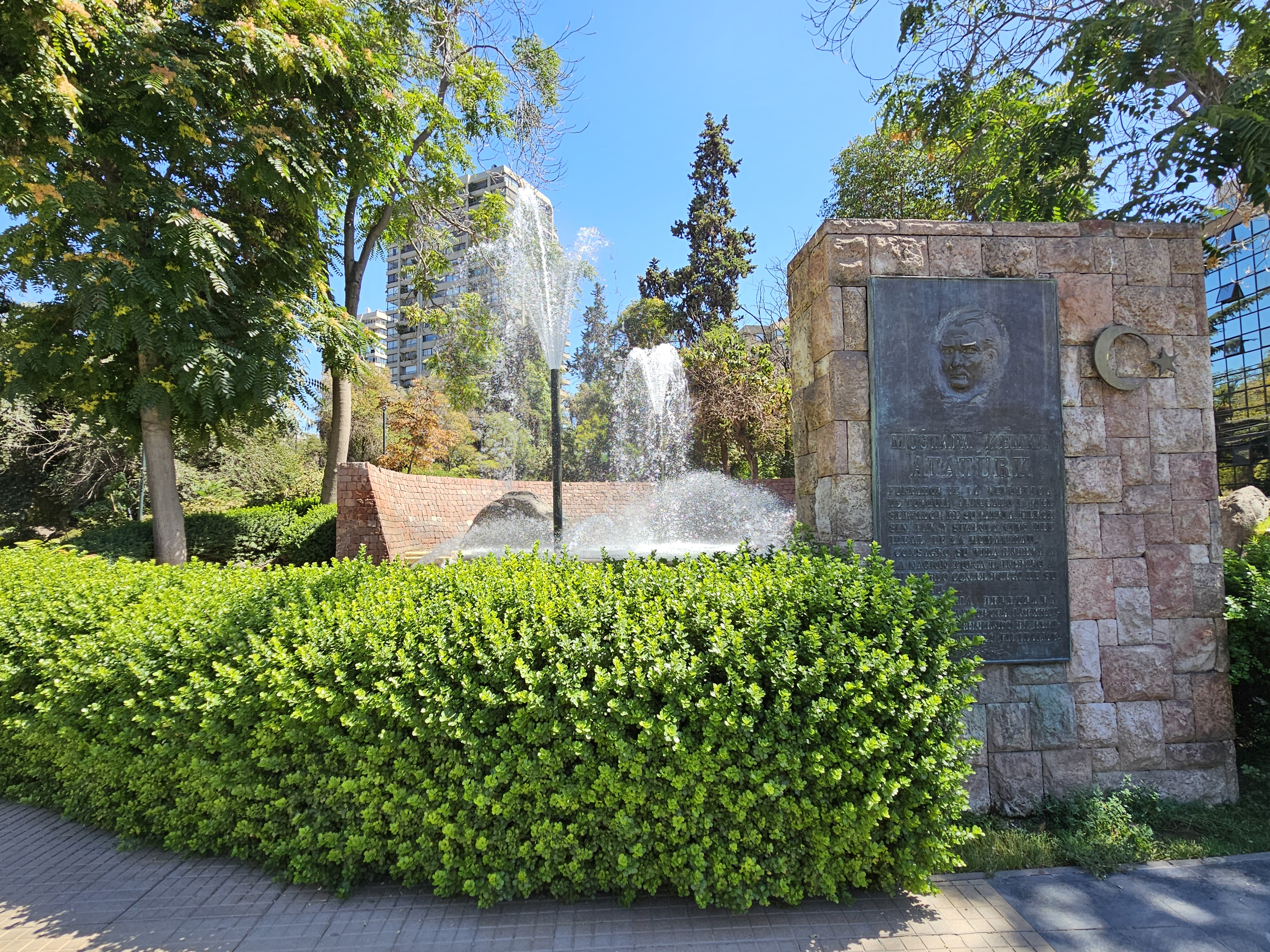
- Opened: 1973
- Dedicated to: Mustafa Kemal Atatürk
- Location: Santiago, Chile
- Interactive map of Mustafa Kemal Atatürk Plaza
- Coordinates: 33.4145°S 70.5875°W

Mustafa Kemal Atatürk Plaza (Spanish: Plaza Mustafa Kemal Atatürk) is a square dedicated to Mustafa Kemal Atatürk, the first president of Turkey, in Santiago, Chile.

== Location ==
The square is located on the famous Avenida Apoquindo (Apoquindo Avenue), near Barrio El Golf, within the boundaries of the Las Condes district, one of Santiago's most modern, financial, and prestigious areas. It is close to the El Golf station on Line 1 (the Red Line) of the Santiago Metro.

== Atatürk Monument ==
In the square stands a large monument featuring a relief bust of Mustafa Kemal Atatürk. The cast-bronze relief bust was created by Turkish sculptor M. Şadi Çalık. The monument was unveiled on 29 October 1973; the English translation of the Spanish inscription on it reads as follows:

Mustafa Kemal Atatürk
Founder of the Republic of Turkey. Selfless and faithful servant of his homeland. Unparalleled hero and living symbol of the ideal of humanity.
He consecrated his entire life to the Turkish nation and inspired his people with the fire of his spirit.
His memory will endure like an inextinguishable torch, keeping the spirit of his people aflame.

== Photos from the plaza ==
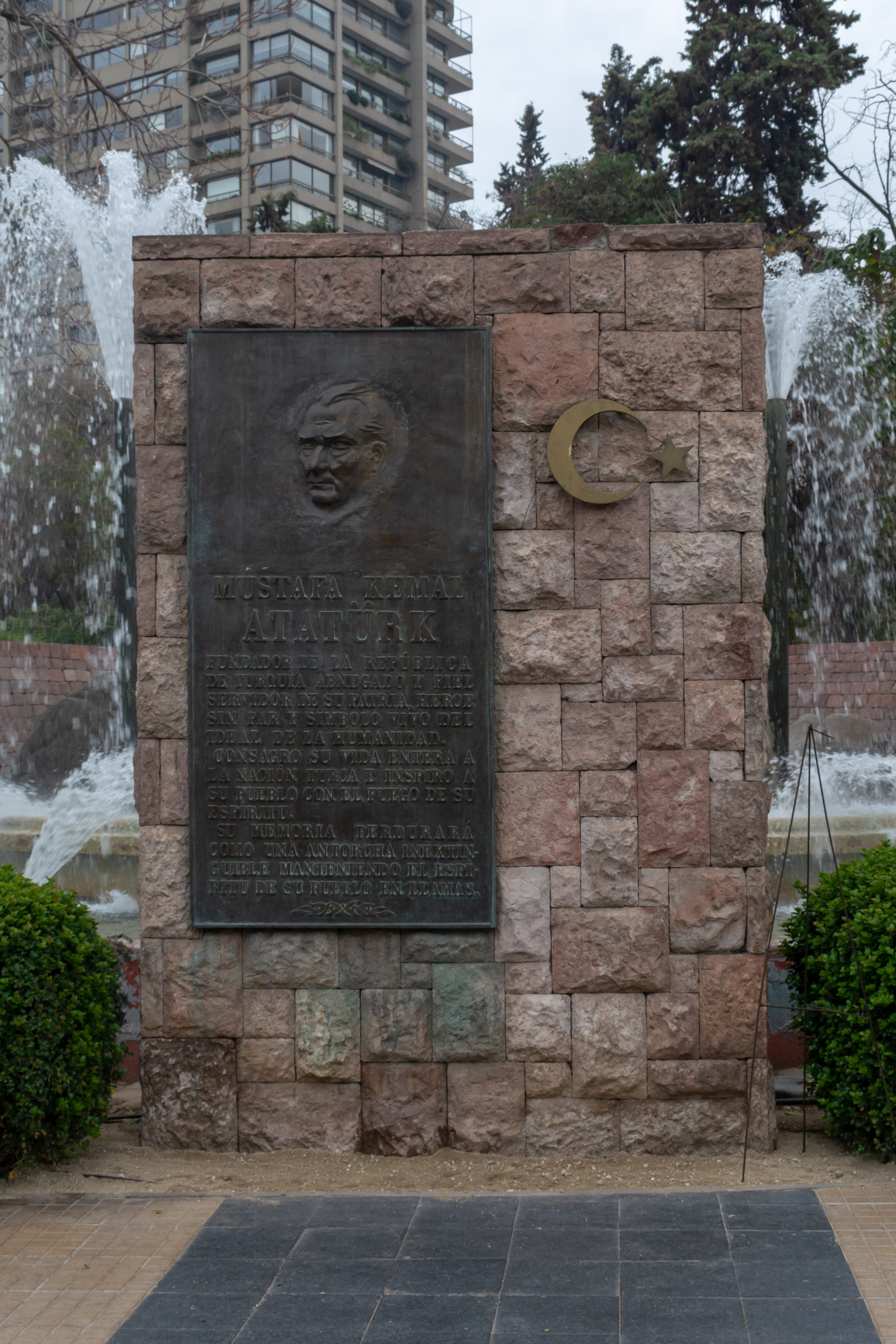
Atatürk Monument

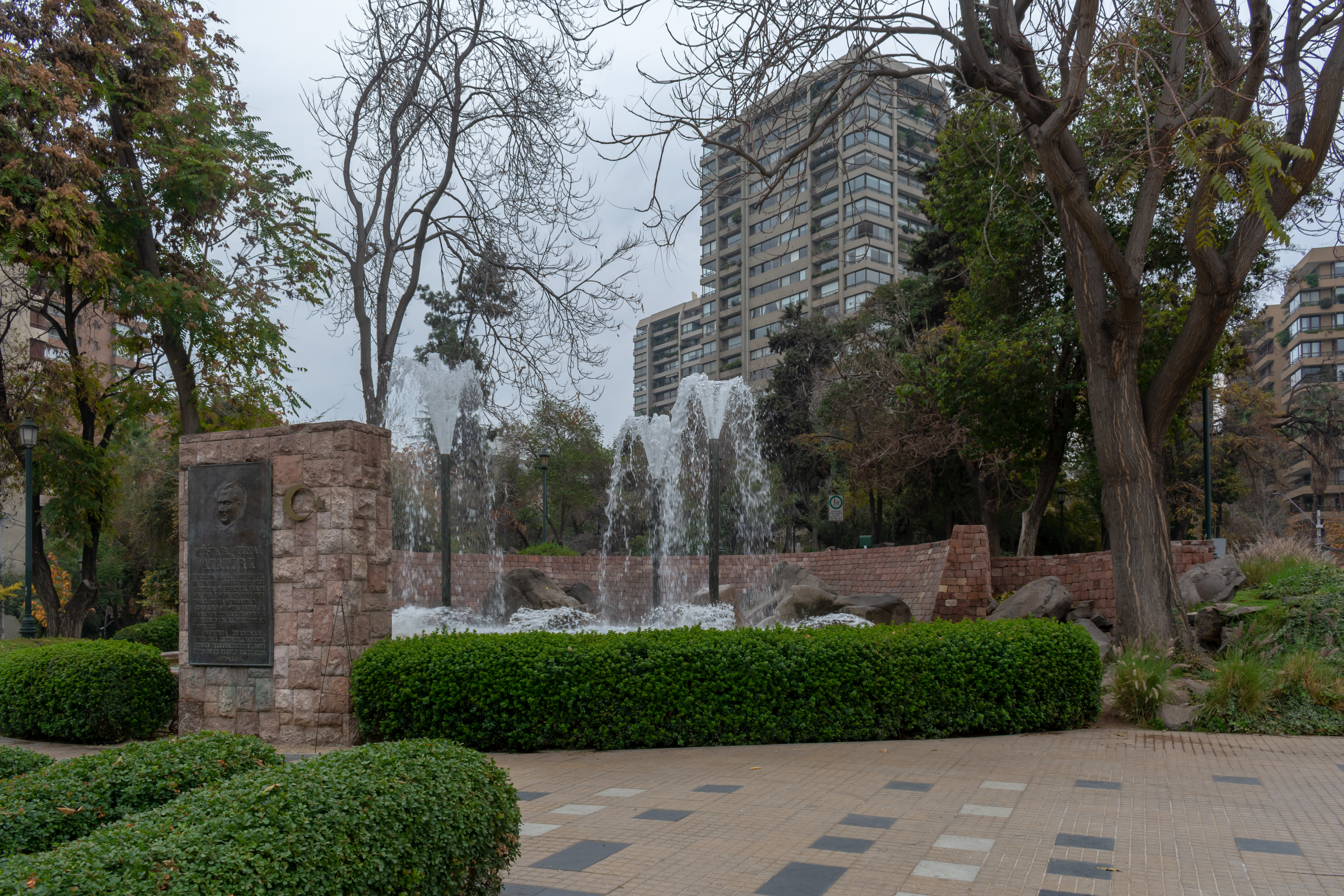
Atatürk Monument and the plaza

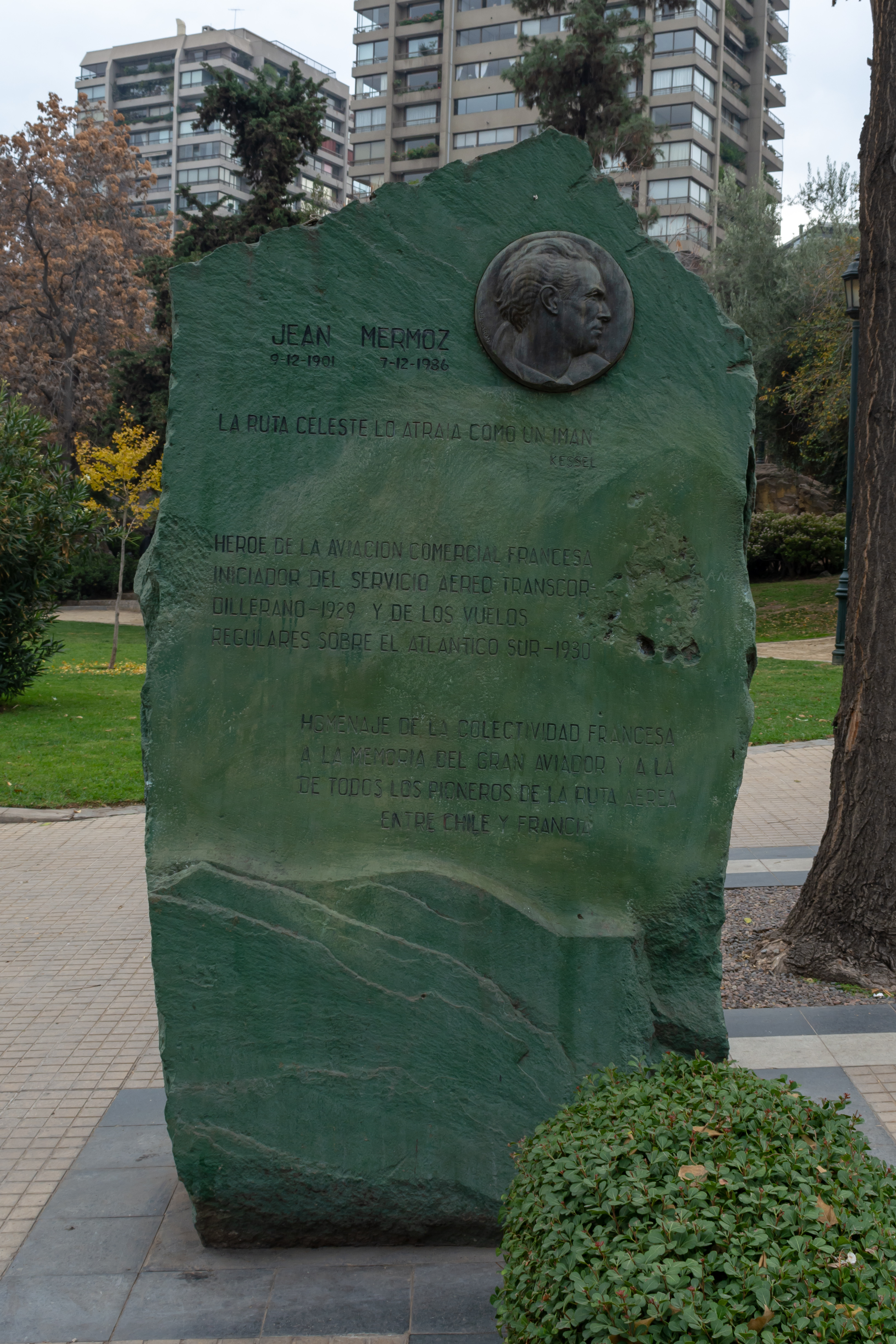
Jean Mermoz Monument

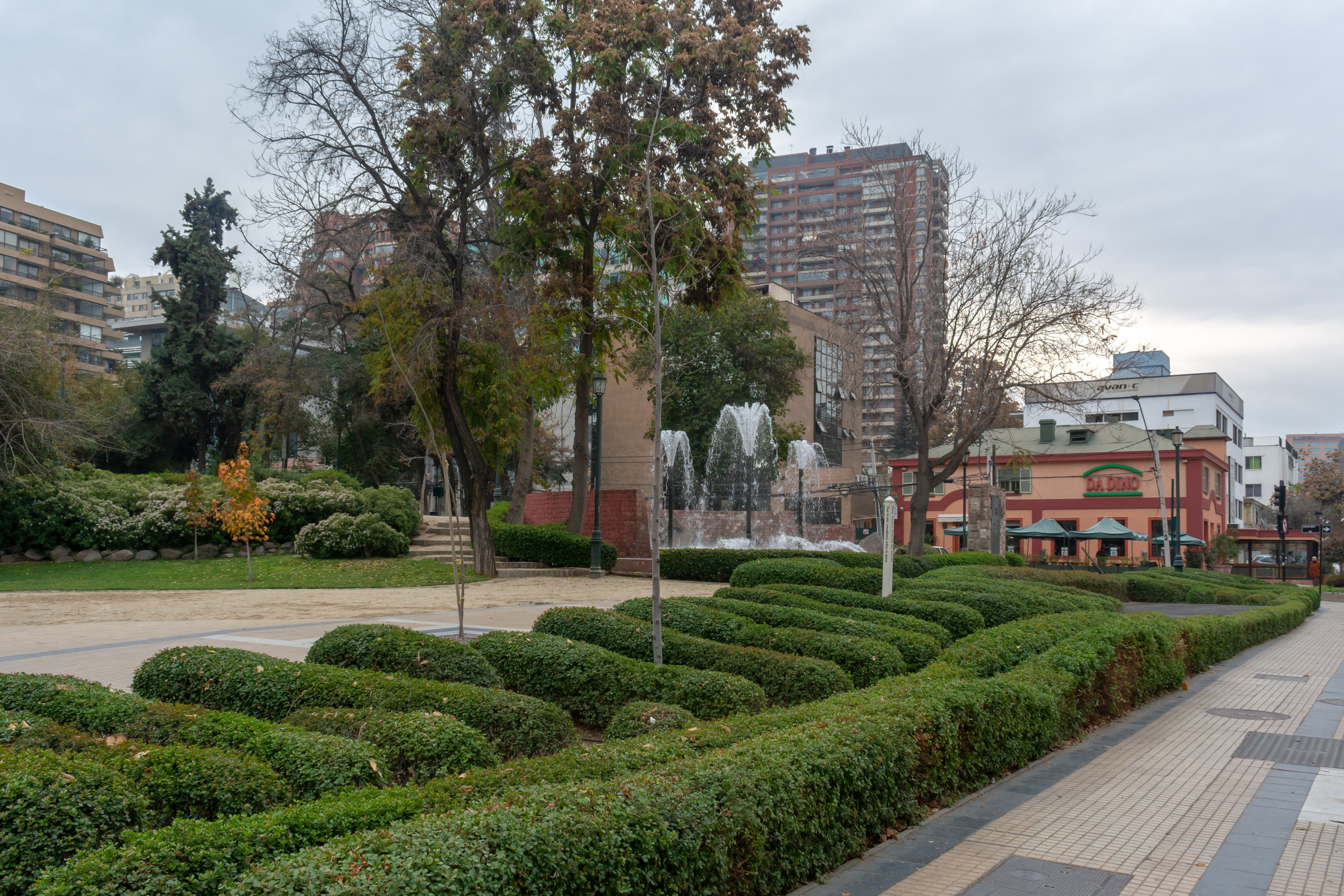

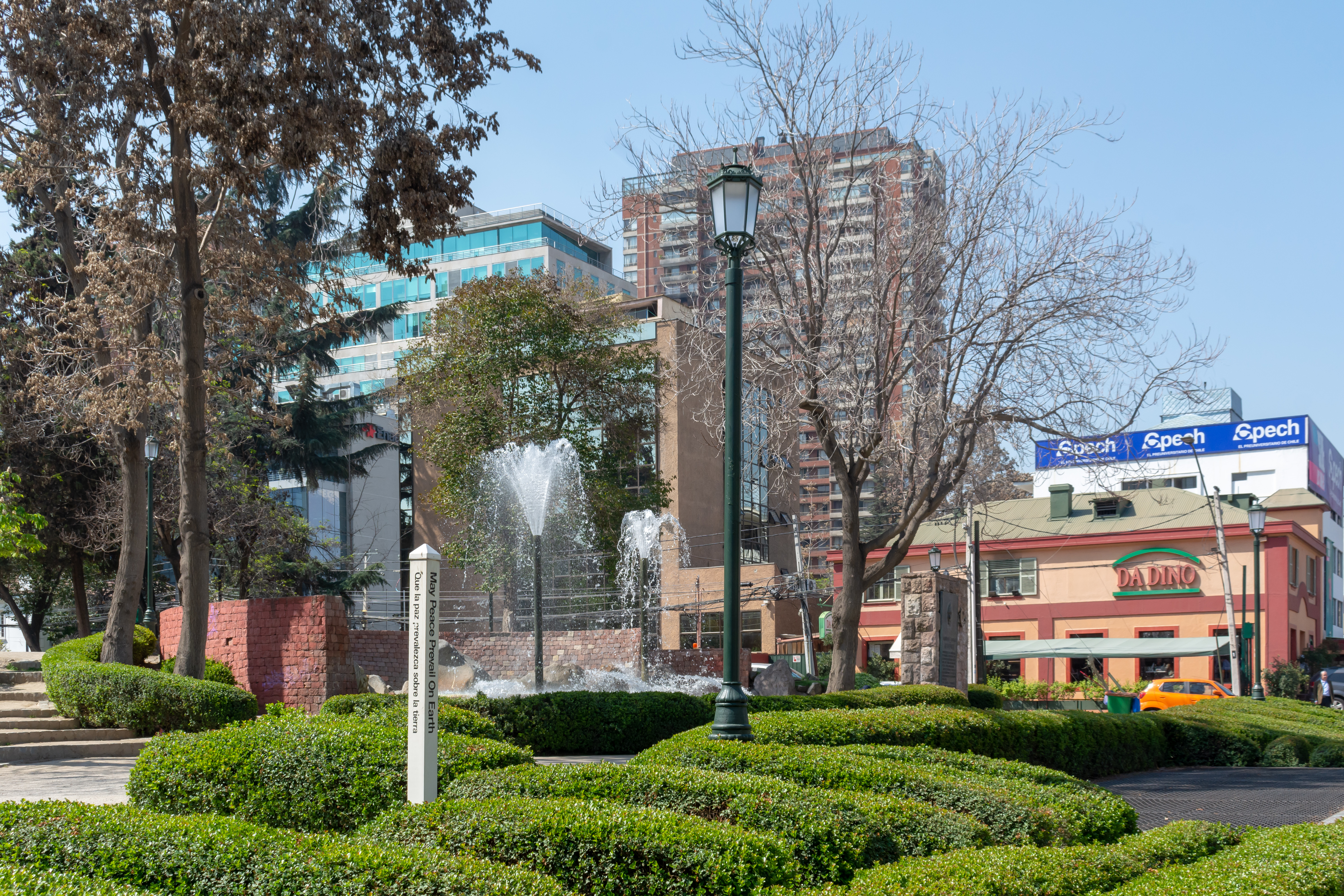

== See also ==
- Chile–Turkey relations
