= Vedat Buz =

Turkish jurist (born 1966)

Vedat Buz (born 1966 in Elazığ), is a Turkish jurist. He is professor of civil law of Ankara University, Law School and Bilkent University Faculty of Law, and author of three law books: Kamu İhale Sözleşmelerinin Kuruluşu ve Geçerlilik Şartları (Establishment and Terms of Validity of Public Procurement Contracts), Medeni Hukukta Yenilik Doğuran Haklar and Borçlunun Temerrüdünde Sözleşmeden Dönme. He is an expert on law of obligations.

He is married and has two children.
