= Widad =

Widad may refer to:

- Wydad Casablanca, athletics club in Casablanca, Morocco
- SS Widad, coastal tanker

== People with the given name ==
- Widad Akrawi (born 1969), Danish activist and writer
- Widad Al-Orfali (1929–??), Iraqi artist and musician
- Widad Bertal (born 1999), Moroccan boxer
- Widad Ibrahim Elmahboub, Sudanese applied mathematician, astrophysicist and aerospace engineer
- Widad Hamdi (1924–1994), Egyptian actress
- Widad Nabi (born 1985), Syrian-Kurdish poet
