= Vedat Yenerer =

Turkish journalist and writer (1965–2026)

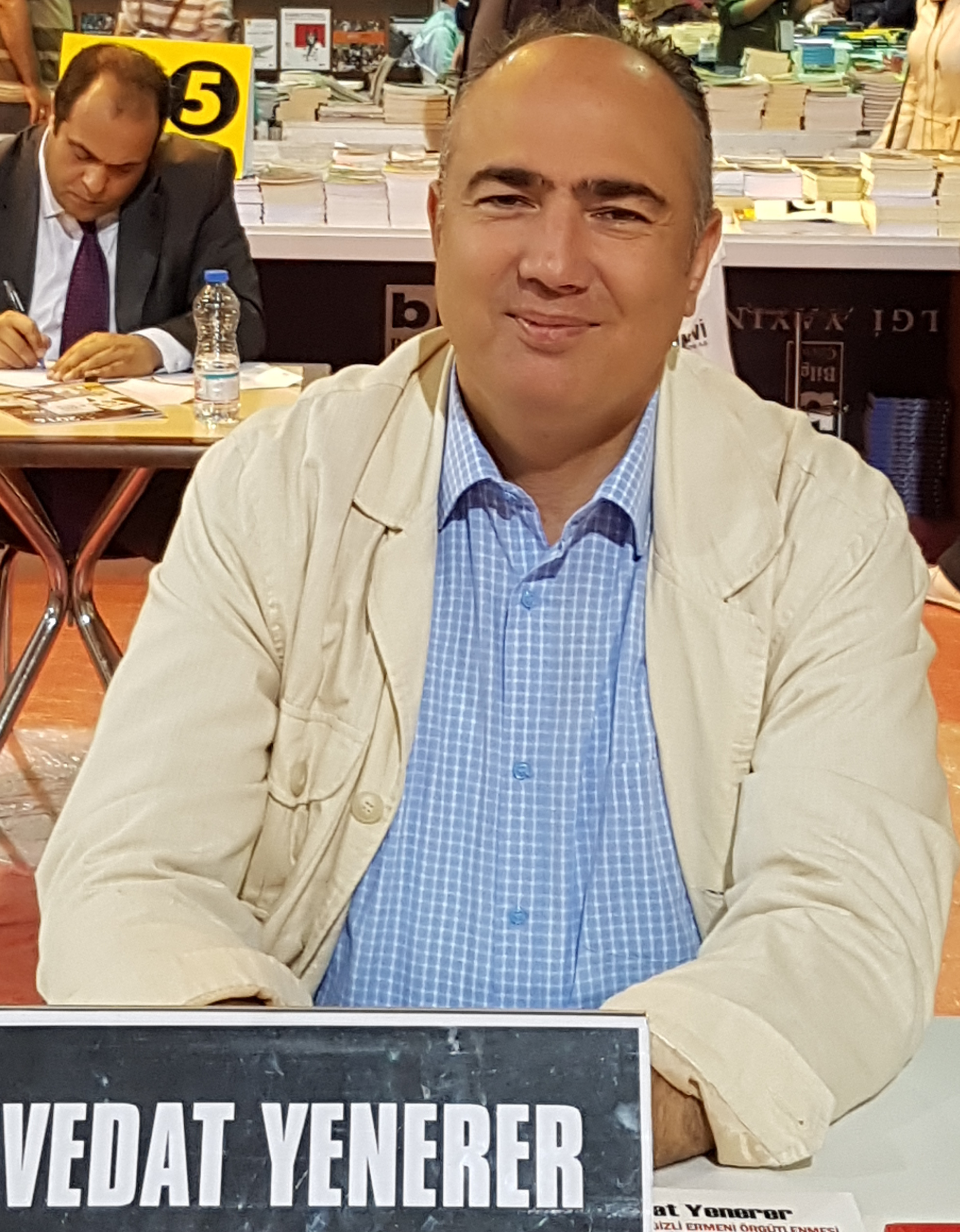
- Yenerer in 2016
- Born: 2 January 1965; Istanbul, Turkey
- Died: July 2026 (aged 61)
- Resting place: Karacaahmet Cemetery
- Citizenship: Turkish
- Occupations: Journalist, writer
- Writing career
- Years active: 1987–2026

Vedat Yenerer (2 January 1965 – 28 July 2026) was a Turkish journalist and writer. As a war correspondent, he visited over 75 countries and published a number of non-fiction books. From 2008 he was a defendant in the Ergenekon trials.

== Life and career ==
Yenerer was born on 2 January 1965. He worked at Cumhuriyet for five years (1987–1992), before moving into television. He was at Show TV (1992–1993 and 1996–1997), Star TV (1993–1994), and 32. Gün (1995–1996). From 1999 to 2002 he was at Kanal D, and then at Habertürk TV (2002–2003). At Show TV he won an award in 1997 for "Human Drama in Hakkari", and has won various other journalism awards. He has reported from many conflict zones, including Iraq, Palestine, Lebanon, Kosovo, Azerbaijan, Albania, Afghanistan, Chechnya, Eritrea, Georgia, Sudan, Somalia, and Kashmir.

He taught a course in international journalism at Istanbul University (2005–2006), and was a columnist at Yeniçağ from 2004 to 2008. Yenerer also presented a news show on Karadeniz TV (2006–2007).

Yenerer died in July 2026, at the age of 61. On July 31, 2026, he was buried at Karacaahmet Cemetery.

== Books ==
- Ateş Ortasında, Ümit Yayincilik, 2001
- Yalanistan Güneydoğu'dan Gerçek Gazeteci Öyküleri , Ümit Yayincilik, 2001
- Düşman Kardeşler, Bulut Yayinlari, 2004
- Çeçenler Kimsesiz Bir Millet , Birharf Yayinlari, 2005
- Irak Yanıyor, 2007
- Kanlı Kukla PKK: Terör Örgütü Gerçeği , Pegasus Yayinlari, 2008
- Demokrasiye ve Hukuka Ergenekon Tezgahı , Bilgi Yayinevi, 2010
- Gördüm Onlar Yaşıyor , Kripto Basin Yayin, 2013

== See also ==
- List of arrested journalists in Turkey
