= Vahit Kirişci =

Turkish politician (born 1960)

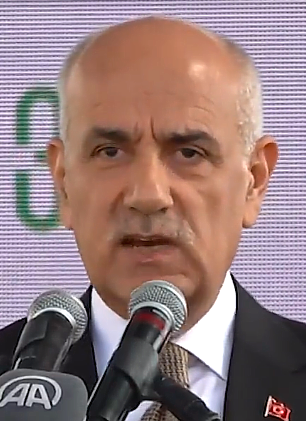

Minister of Agriculture and Forestry
- In office 4 March 2022 – 4 June 2023
- President: Recep Tayyip Erdoğan
- Preceded by: Bekir Pakdemirli
- Succeeded by: İbrahim Yumaklı

Member of the Grand National Assembly
- Incumbent
- Assumed office 2 June 2023
- Constituency: Kahramanmaraş (2023)

Personal details
- Born: 4 December 1960 (age 65) Kahramanmaraş, Turkey
- Party: Justice and Development Party
- Education: Çukurova University, Cranfield University

Vahit Kirişci (born 4 December 1960) is a Turkish politician. He served as the Minister of Agriculture and Forestry from 4 March 2022 to 4 June 2023. He was elected as Member of Parliament from Kahramanmaraş for the Justice and Development Party in the 2023 elections.

== Career ==
He graduated from the Faculty of Agriculture of Çukurova University. He completed his doctorate at the Cranfield University in England. He worked as part of the technical staff in the Ministry of Agriculture and Rural Affairs. He gave lectures as a lecturer at Çukurova University. He became associate professor in 1995 and professor in 2001. He published 55 articles, books, commission reports and papers,16 of which were in foreign languages. He worked as a manager in many non-governmental organizations. He is a 22nd and 23rd term Member of Parliament from Adana. In the 22nd term, he served as Deputy Chairman of the Turkey EU Joint Parliamentary Commission and as Chairman of the Agriculture, Forestry and Rural Affairs Committee of the Grand National Assembly of Turkey. He was re-elected as the chairman of the same commission in the 23rd Term.

He was appointed as the Minister of Agriculture and Forestry upon the resignation of Bekir Pakdemirli on 4 March 2022.

He was succeeded by İbrahim Yumaklı on 4 June 2023, after he was elected as Member of Parliament in the parliamentary election held on 14 May.

== Private life ==
He is married and has three children.

Political offices
Preceded by Bekir Pakdemirli	Minister of Agriculture and Forestry; 4 March 2022 – 4 June 2023	Succeeded by İbrahim Yumaklı
