= Eldad and Medad =

Israelite prophets

Eldad (Hebrew: אֶלְדָּד, Modern: ’Eldad, Tiberian: ’Eldāḏ) and Medad (Hebrew: מֵידָד, Modern: Mēdad, Tiberian: Mēḏāḏ) are mentioned in the Book of Numbers, and are described as having prophesied among the Israelites, despite the fact that they had remained in the camp, while 70 elders had gone to the tabernacle outside the camp to receive the ability to prophesy from God. According to the narrative, Joshua asked Moses to forbid Eldad and Medad from prophecy, but Moses argued that it was a good thing that others could prophesy, and that ideally all the Israelites would prophesy.

In rabbinical tradition, there are a number of opinions as to what Eldad and Medad prophesized. According to one source they are said to have predicted a war with Gog and Magog, with the king from Magog uniting the non-Jews and launching war in Israel against the Jews, but these non-Jews being defeated and slain by fire from the Throne of God. Some classical rabbinical literature argues that the non-Jews would be at the mercy of the Jewish Messiah; such Messianic connections of Eldad and Medad also circulated among early Christian groups, and a particularly popular discussion of such prophecy was even quoted in the apocryphal Shepherd of Hermas. According to other Rabbinic sources they predicted God's forthcoming sending of the quail in response to the Israelites's complaining of hunger in Exodus 13:16. Lastly according to the other source, which Rashi quotes, they predicted that Moses would pass and Joshua would lead the children of Israel into the Land of Israel.

The unique Greek quotation is in the Visions of The Shepherd of Hermas 2.3.4, which Latin, Ethiopic, and Coptic versions are derived from.

According to biblical scholars, the real purpose of the story was to indicate that prophecy was not restricted to a select few people. However, the text states that Eldad and Medad "were of them that were written down", making them less representative of the general population, although some textual scholars believe that this is a gloss added to the original Elohist account, by a later editor who objected to the idea that anyone could become a prophet. The names themselves are hence unimportant to the point of the story, and may have been chosen simply for the sake of assonance; they seem to refer to dad, suggesting polytheism and/or a non-Israelite origin:

- if the names are Hebrew, then dad could mean 'paternal uncle', with Eldad thus meaning 'God is the brother of my father' or 'El is the brother of my father', and Medad meaning '(one who is) of my father's brother'
- if the names are Assyrian, then dad could be a corruption of daddu, meaning 'beloved', with Eldad thus meaning 'God is beloved' or 'El is beloved', and Medad meaning 'object of affection'
- if the names are Akkadian, then dad could be a corruption of Adad, the name of a deity known to the Aramaeans as Hadad, with Eldad thus meaning 'El is Hadad' or 'Hadad is God', and Medad meaning '(one who is) of Hadad'

According to Jewish tradition, Eldad and Medad were buried in the same cave in Edrei.
