= Ministry of Trade (Turkey) =

Government ministry of Turkey

- Ticaret Bakanlığı

Agency overview
- Formed: 8 June 2011; 15 years ago
- Preceding agencies: Ministry of Economy; Ministry of Customs and Trade
- Jurisdiction: Government of Turkey
- Headquarters: Ankara; 39°54′19″N 32°45′26″E
- Minister responsible: Ömer Bolat
- Deputy Ministers responsible: Mahmut Gürcan; Mustafa Tuzcu; Özgür Volkan Ağar; Sezai Uçarmak
- Website: www.trade.gov.tr

The Ministry of Trade (Turkish: Ticaret Bakanlığı) is a government ministry office of the Republic of Turkey, responsible for customs and trade related affairs in Turkey. The ministry is headed by Ömer Bolat.

The ministry was founded by the Act No. 640 by through the merger of the Prime Ministry's Undersecretariate of Customs with some departments of the former Ministry of Industry and Trade on 8 June 2011. In the past, duties of the current ministry were carried out by the Ministry of Customs and Monopoly (1931–1983), Ministry of Finance and Customs (1983–1991) and Undersecretariate of Customs (1993–2011). The first minister of the newly established ministry became Hayati Yazıcı, who served as the undersecretary before. Between 2011 and 2018, its official name was Ministry of Customs and Trade (Turkish: Gümrük ve Ticaret Bakanlığı). It merged with Ministry of Economy in 2018 and rebranded as Ministry of Trade.
