= Ministry of Transport and Infrastructure (Turkey) =

Government ministry of Turkey

- Ulaştırma ve Altyapı Bakanlığı

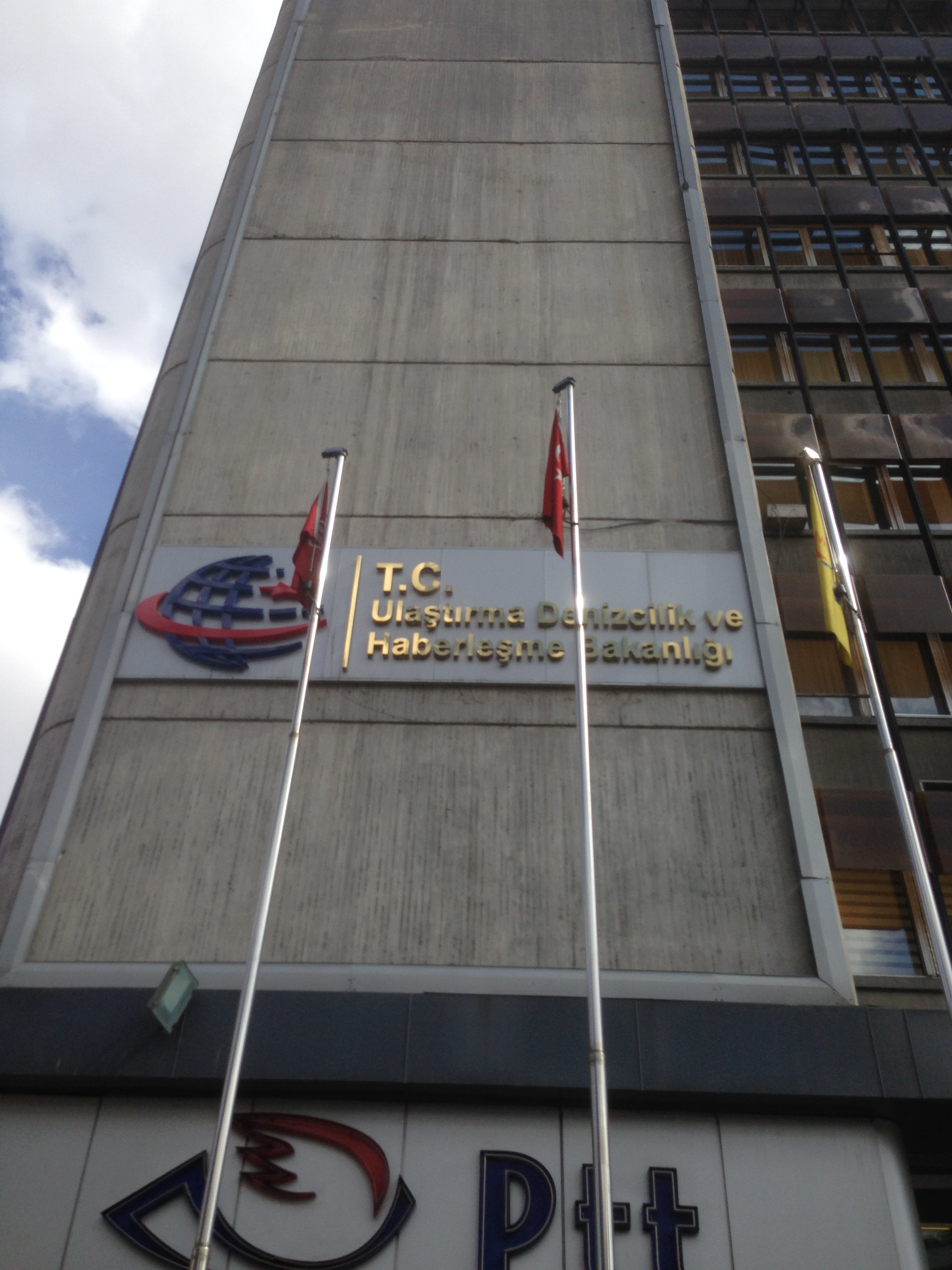

Agency overview
- Formed: 27 May 1939
- Jurisdiction: Government of Turkey
- Headquarters: Ankara
- Minister responsible: Abdulkadir Uraloğlu
- Deputy Ministers responsible: Enver İskurt; Ömer Fatih Sayan; Durmuş Ünüvar; Osman Boyraz
- Website: www.uab.gov.tr

The Ministry of Transport and Infrastructure (Turkish: Ulaştırma ve Altyapı Bakanlığı) is a government ministry office of the Republic of Turkey, responsible for transport, information and communication services in Turkey. Its head office is in Ankara. The current minister is Abdulkadir Uraloğlu, in office since June 2023.

== Agency and bodies ==
=== Central directorates-general and departments ===
- Directorate-General of Transport Services Regulation (DGTSR)
- Directorate-General of Maritime Affairs (DGMA)
  - Previously the Marine Accident Investigation Commission investigated maritime incidents and accidents.
- Directorate-General of Shipyards and Coastal Structures (DGSCS)
- Directorate-General of Communications (DGC)
- Directorate-General of Infrastructure Investments (DGII)
- Directorate-General of European Union Affairs and Foreign Relations (DGEUFR)
- Directorate-General of Legal Services
- Directorate-General of Personnel
- Strategy Development Department
- Inspection Services Department
- Directorate of Transport, Maritime Affairs, and Communications Research Center (DoTMCRC)
- Directorate of Transport Safety Investigation Center (DoTSIC)
- Revolving Funds Department
- Information Technologies Department
- Support Services Department
- Internal Audit Office
- Office of Press and Public Relations
- Office of the Private Secretary

=== Subsidiaries, affiliated and related institutions ===
- Directorate-General of Highways (DGH)
- Directorate-General of Civil Aviation (DGCA)
- Directorate-General of Turkish State Railways (DGTSR)
- Directorate-General of State Airports Authority (DGSAA)
- Directorate-General of Turkish Post Company
- Directorate-General of Coastal Safety
- Information Technologies and Communication Authority
- Turksat Satellite Communications and Cable TV Operations Company
