= Ministry of Labour and Social Security (Turkey) =

Government ministry of Turkey

- Çalışma ve Sosyal Güvenlik Bakanlığı

Agency overview
- Formed: 22 June 1945; 81 years ago
- Preceding agencies: Ministry of Labour; Ministry of Social Security; Ministry of Family, Labour and Social Services
- Headquarters: Ankara, Turkey; 39°54′54″N 32°49′13″E
- Annual budget: 49.855.256.000 Turkish lira (2017)
- Minister responsible: Vedat Işıkhan
- Deputy Ministers responsible: Adnan Ertem; Ahmet Aydın; Faruk Özçelik; Lütfihak Alpkan
- Website: www.csgb.gov.tr

The Ministry of Labour and Social Security (Turkish: Çalışma ve Sosyal Güvenlik Bakanlığı) is a government ministry office of the Republic of Turkey, responsible for labour and social security affairs in Turkey. The ministry is headed by Vedat Işıkhan.

== History ==
Initially, the ministry was formed as the Office of Labour and Labourers within the Ministry of Economy upon Act of Parliament No. 2450, which came into force on 27 May 1934. As a governmental ministry, it was established on June 22, 1945 with the Act of Parliament No. 4763.

In 1983, the Ministry of Labour and the Ministry of Social Security were merged into the Ministry of Labour and Social Security. In 2018, the ministry was merged with the Ministry of Family and Social Policy. This merger was undone in 2021, making the Labour and Social Security related tasks headed by a separate minister again.

== See also ==
- Cabinet of Turkey
- Ministries of Labour
- Ministries of Social Security
