= Michael Moore (saxophonist and clarinetist) =

American jazz musician (born 1954)

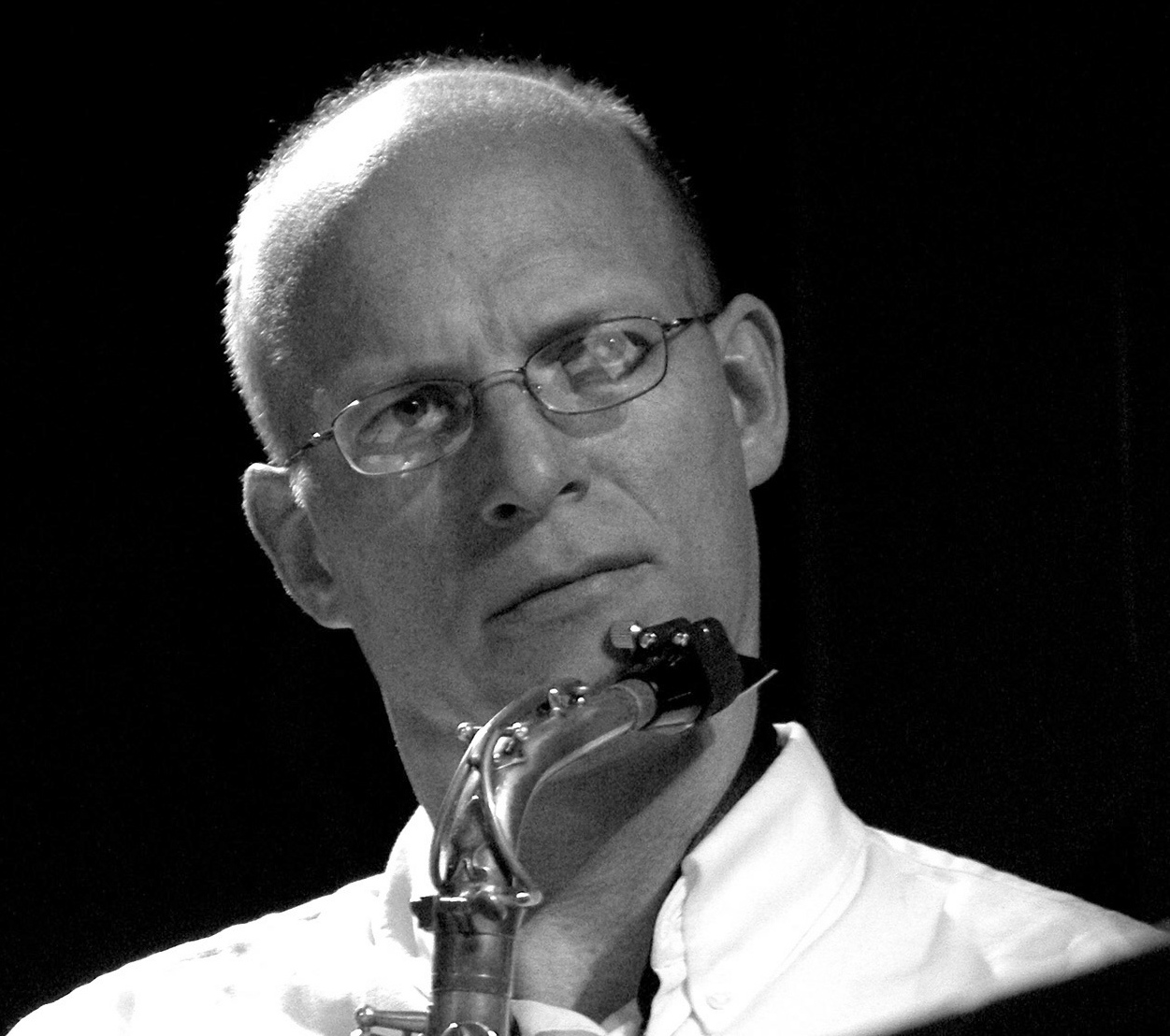
- Michael Moore with the ICP in Chicago, 2004

Background information
- Born: December 4, 1954 (age 71); Eureka, California, U.S.
- Genres: Avant-garde jazz, free jazz, free improvisation
- Occupation: Musician
- Instruments: Clarinet, saxophone
- Years active: 1970s–present

Michael Moore (born December 4, 1954) is an American jazz musician who has lived in the Netherlands since 1982.

== Background and career ==
The son of a semi-professional musician, Moore was born and raised in Eureka, California. He studied music at Humboldt State and in 1977 graduated from the New England Conservatory of Music, where he studied with Jaki Byard and Gunther Schuller, and was a classmate of Marty Ehrlich. He played in a variety of musical contexts, especially those in support of theatre and dance groups. By 1982 he was a regular member of Misha Mengelberg's Instant Composers Pool and had moved to Amsterdam. He was also a member of Georg Gräwe's Grubenklang Orchester.

Moore is one-third of the Clusone Trio (aka Trio Clusone and Clusone 3) with cellist Ernst Reijseger and drummer Han Bennink. Originally meant only to play a single date at a festival in Clusone, Italy, the trio toured irregularly for several years and recorded six albums, including one of freely-interpreted Irving Berlin compositions.

Moore's first recording as a leader was in 1992 but it was with 1994's Chicoutimi that he began to earn recognition as a composer. The drummerless trio on this album (Fred Hersch, piano, and Mark Helias, bass) was inspired by the duo recordings of Lee Konitz and Gil Evans and recalls in places the Jimmy Giuffre trios of the early 1960s.

Moore also plays in Jewels and Binoculars, a collective trio with bassist Lindsey Horner and drummer Michael Vatcher which is devoted to interpretations of Bob Dylan songs. In 1986, Moore won the VPRO/Boy Edgar Award, the most prestigious jazz award in the Netherlands. In 1991, he founded Ramboy Records to document his music.

Moore started his jazz quintet in 2005, in which he works with accomplished Dutch players: trumpeter Eric Vloeimans, pianist Marc van Roon, bassist Paul Berner, and drummer Owen Hart, Jr. In October 2005, the quintet recorded the album Osiris.

In 2013, he performed with InstanPool, a group of international musicians making improved music and occasionally playing a composition. InstanPool consists of Michael Moore and Mark Alban Lotz (winds), Korhan Erel and Robert van Heumen (laptops), Sevket Akinci and Giray Gürkal (guitars, electronics). Some members are also in Islak Köpek.

== Discography ==
=== As leader ===
- MGM Trio (1996) with Marilyn Crispell and Gerry Hemingway
- Thirteen Ways (1997) with Fred Hersch
- Monitor (1999)
- The Voice Is The Matter (1999) with Jodi Gilbert
- Mt. Olympus (2000) with Alex Maguire
- Pursuit (2000) with Benoit Delbecq 5
- White Widow (2001)
- Air Street (2002)
- Floating 1...2...3 (2002)
- Jewels & Binoculars (2003)
- Kamosc (2006) with Achim Kaufmann
- Simple Songs (2007) with Celano Baggiani Group
- This We Know (2008) with Fred Hersch
- Fragile (2008)
- PPP5 (2009) with Cor Fuhler
- Live In NYC (2011) with Will Holhauser
- Easter Sunday (2011)
- Coconut (2012) with Eric Boeren
- Something Nothing (2013) with Achim Kaufmann
- Nothing Something (2013) with Achim Kaufmann
- Furthermore (2013) with Achim Kaufmann
- Felix Quartet (2016)

With Dave Douglas

- Mountain Passages (Greenleaf, 2005)

== Bibliography ==
- Biography at Ramboy Recordings
- Whitehead, Kevin. New Dutch Swing (1998). New York: Billboard Books. ISBN 0-8230-8334-9.
