= Serdar Nasır =

Turkish plastic surgeon

Serdar Nazif Nasır
- Education: Ankara University; Hacettepe University; Süleyman Demirel University
- Known for: Performing: the second full face transplant in Turkey; world's first two-arm and two-leg transplant
- Scientific career
- Fields: Plastic surgery
- Workplaces: Hacettepe University Medical School's Institute of Plastic, Reconstructive and Aesthetic Surgery

Serdar Nazif Nasır is a Turkish plastic surgeon. He is an associate professor at the Hacettepe University Medical School in Ankara and led the team that performed Turkey's second full face transplant in February 2012.

== Education ==
Nasır completed high school in Yenimahalle, Ankara, in 1989. He graduated from the Faculty of Medicine at Ankara University in 1996. From 1996 to 2002, he completed specialist training in the Department of Plastic, Reconstructive and Aesthetic Surgery at Hacettepe University Faculty of Medicine.

After working seven years at Süleyman Demirel University in Isparta, Serdar Nasır returned to Hacettepe University in 2009.

From 2006 to 2008, he undertook further training in composite tissue transplantation at the Cleveland Clinic in Ohio, United States. His areas of practice include breast reconstruction, hand surgery, reconstruction of tissue defects, facial muscle reconstruction for facial nerve paralysis, and facial and body aesthetics.

Serdar Nasır is specialized in the fields of breast reconstruction, hand surgery, repair of tissue deficiencies, restoration of facial muscles in paralysis of facial nerves, and face and body esthetics.

== Achievements ==
On 24 February 2012, Nasır and his team performed a full face transplant and a multiple-limb transplant at Hacettepe University Hospital. The face transplant was the second performed in Turkey, following the country's first full face transplant the previous month. The transplantation of two arms and two legs was reported as the first procedure of its kind attempted worldwide.

The recipient, 25-year-old Cengiz Gül, had sustained severe facial burns in a television tube implosion when he was two years old. The donor was a 40-year-old man whose family requested that his identity not be disclosed. He had been declared brain dead following a motorcycle accident on 17 February.

The second transplant was simultaneously carried out in another operating room on Şevket Çavdar (25), who lost his two arms and two legs in a natural gas explosion caused by short circuit as he was carrying out installation in 1998. The organs were taken from the same donor at Dokuz Eylül University's hospital in İzmir by Prof. Gökhan Tunçbilek, and were brought to Ankara on board an aircraft belonging to the Ministry of Health.

Şevket Çavdar died on February 27, 2012, while he was being treated in the intensive care station, after his transplanted two arms and two legs were amputated the day before due to immune dysregulation. This case was accepted as first quadruple extremity transplantation in the world.

== Awards ==
Serdar Nasır is the winner of second prizes in national competitions of experimental and clinical specialty for plastic surgery.
