= Directors Lounge =

Directors Lounge (abbreviation: DL) is an ongoing Berlin-based film and media-art platform with year-round screenings and exhibitions in Berlin and various other cities. Annually parallel to the Berlin Film Festival (February), the central event of the Directors Lounge, the intensified presentation The Berlin International Directors Lounge takes place. Directors Lounge is the brainchild of filmmaker André Werner, artist Joachim Seinfeld and gallerist/curator Longest F. Stein in conjunction with the A&O-gallery and other artists from the Berlin media art scene.

== Founding ==
Directors Lounge was founded informally in 2005 to provide filmmakers and video artists an unceremonious environment to meet and interact during the Berlinale, as well as to screen works that did not conform to categorization of length, method or subject matter, whether by known or obscure artists. In contrast to most such festivals, the surroundings were to be free of the “black box” atmosphere of standard cinemas and screening spaces, but rather selected to cultivate dialogue. As such, its aim was also to serve as a launching pad for collaborations. Due to the positive response, the event was expanded beyond being an annual festival, and it came to be a continuous platform for film and media art, with the Berlin International Directors Lounge (i.e., the annual event in February, see section below) remaining the focal event. The festival has been held at various locations, with special attention being shown to maintaining a non-standardized multi-media experience.

== Berlin International Directors Lounge ==
Berlin International Directors Lounge
- Location: Berlin, Germany
- Founded: 2005
- Awards: no awards conferred
- No. of films: 305 (327 screenings + installational loops) from 51 countries in 2014
- Website: www.directorslounge.net

The publicly attended annual event held in February parallel to the Berlin Film Festival is primarily a film forum with an emphasis on short films, but also includes installations and hosts musical and art performances. Many films are shown as World Premieres. The artistic direction of the most recent event (stylized as “[DLX]”, Feb. 6 – 16, 2014) was credited to Julia Murakami, André Werner, Klaus W. Eisenlohr and Kenton Turk. Frequent curator-contributors have included filmmakers Alexei Dmitriev (Russia) and Shaun Wilson (Australia) as well as the late Heiko Daxl (Germany) together with Ingeborg Fülepp (Croatia), both media artists.

The first festival (2005) was held in Club el Cultrún in the Berlin district Friedrichshain. In 2006 and 2007, converted spaces fronting Karl-Marx-Allee (137 and 133 respectively) served as the festival location. In 2008 and 2009, Directors Lounge moved to the now defunct Scala (opened in 1908 as Überbrettl, later Aladin, still later Camera, “the only arthouse cinema in the GDR”) in Mitte, and in 2010 and 2011, the art house Meinblau on the Pfefferberg in Pankow served as the venue. With the eighth festival, it was relocated back to Mitte, to the Naherholung Sternchen, behind the famous premiere cinema Kino International near Alexanderplatz.

As the name implies, the film festival concentrates on providing an informal and ambient atmosphere which offers filmmakers and film enthusiasts an opportunity to come into casual contact with one other, in contrast to many similar ventures. It is open to all submissions regardless of length. Aside from selections from this Open Call, it consists of a number of specially curated programs.

The festival does not confer awards on participating films, setting it apart from most similar exhibitions. It is a non-profit event supported to a large extent by volunteer services and some sponsoring. Performers and guest speakers are not paid for their participation.

Notable recent participants in this festival include Golden Globe and BAFTA-winner Michael Nyman, who attended the first public screening in Germany of his feature film NYman With A Movie Camera (2011); Canadian filmmaker Guy Maddin, who supplied a selection of short films the same year he served on the jury of the Berlinale (2011); Cannes Film Festival triple award-winning photographer/filmmaker Anton Corbijn (2012); Sundance International Jury Prize winner Simon Ellis, who appeared for a self-curated retrospective of his films (2012) and "Cinema of Transgression" spearhead Nick Zedd, who likewise attended a retrospective selection of his short films (2012). Notable recent premieres include the first public screening of works by Turkish digital media artist Erdal Inci in Germany (2014).

Performers have included video performance artist Max Hattler (with "Audiovisual Abstractions"), musician/novelist Phil Shoenfelt with his band Dim Locator and Deutscher Filmpreis winner Birol Ünel (reading poetry by the "NO!art" anti-art movement member Miron Zownir).

Although no cessation of the event has been declared, the festival has not been mounted in this full form since "DLX" in 2014, following which the selected venue Naherholung Sternchen closed to the public.

== Year-round media-art platform ==
Poster for Directors Lounge presentation in St. Petersburg, Russia in 2008.

The February festival soon grew to encompass year-round presentations. There have been a number of Directors Lounge-related events and cooperations outside Germany, notably in London (Cog Collective, 2006), Poznań (IF Museum, 2006), Denver (TIE [The International Experimental Cinema Exhibition], 2006), Miami (Art Basel Miami Beach, 2006), St. Petersburg (in connection with the Goethe-Institut, 2008), Paris (Nuit Blanche, 2011), Los Angeles (with the Los Angeles Art Association, 2011), Timișoara (Timishort Film Festival, 2011), Rome (L'Isola del Cinema, Cinelab Groupama, 2012), Albuquerque (Experiments in Cinema, 2012 and 2013), Seoul (Zaha Museum, 2012; Gallery On, 2014), Vienna (Museumsquartier, 2014), Porto Alegre (Usina do Gasômetro, in connection with Goethe-Institut, 2015) and Salvador (in connection with Ocupação Coaty, 2016). Similar domestic events outside Berlin include Dessau (Bauhaus Kolleg, 2007), Munich (Memory in Motion, 2007), Cologne (Tease Art Fair, 2009), Essen (C.A.R., 2011), Düsseldorf (Japan Day, Blackbox-Kino in the Filmmuseum, 2011, 2012, 2013 and 2014) and Dresden (Motorenhalle, 2015). These presentations often mirror the multi-media concept of the February event. Recent performers at these excursions include VJ Chuuu (Japan) and Kraftwerk founding member Eberhard Kranemann.

In addition to these out-of-town excursions, there are regular presentations in Berlin itself. Prominent among these are ongoing monthly presentations by Klaus W. Eisenlohr. These screenings characteristically include discussion rounds with the filmmakers and audience following the film presentations. Most are held in the “Z-inema” of the Z-Bar, which hosts many and varied cultural events. Eisenlohr also curates a special ongoing series of screenings entitled "Urban Research" that is regularly presented as part of the festival in February. Directors Lounge mounts as well other multi-media events in Berlin, often as part of city arts festivals. Recent performers at these include Turkish computer musician/sound designer and Islak Köpek member Korhan Erel (2016). and legendary Rio de Janeiro performer and "Black Future" member Tantão (2018) By special arrangement with the National Film Board of Canada, Guy Maddin's algorithmically generated film Seances was presented as part of such a performance/film event during Berlin Art Week in September 2021, alongside Roger Ballen's Roger the Rat in German premiere and a performance by the Japanese duo Bonnhoh, featuring Hiroki Mano, co-lead in the award-winning film The Days Between.

Online, the platform maintains Directors Lounge Magazine, which posts photos and curiosities of specific and broader interest and publishes original reviews of films shown by Directors Lounge as well as the "DL Deep Feature" series, in-depth exclusive interview-based articles on various figures associated in some way with DL. Canadian director/screenwriter Brandon Cronenberg was among its first subjects. In June, 2019, the compacted duolingual counterpart "DL Featurillo" was launched (initial featured artist: Claudia Guilino a.k.a. Calla Mar).

The focus of Directors Lounge events remains largely contemporary experimental film and an innovative reconceptualization of the nature of screenings. In 2015, the platform premiered "DL à la carte," a concept for a localized but asynchronous film festival selection presentation in cooperation with shoutr labs (Berlin), in the latter's first such undertaking (Berliner Liste fair for contemporary art, September 2015).

Directors Lounge is despite the parallel time frame of the February event not in any way connected to the Berlin International Film Festival, nor is it to be confused with a later-founded German organization named Regielounge, whose name in the English translation variously appears as “Director's Lounge” or “Directors Lounge.”

== Accolades ==
In September 2021, Directors Lounge was presented with the Award for Artistic Project Spaces and Initiatives (Preis zur Auszeichnung künstlerischer Projekträume und -initiativen) by the Berlin Senate's Department of Culture and Europe (de:Senatsverwaltung für Kultur und Europa).
