= Haluk Topaloğlu =

Haluk Aydın Topaloğlu
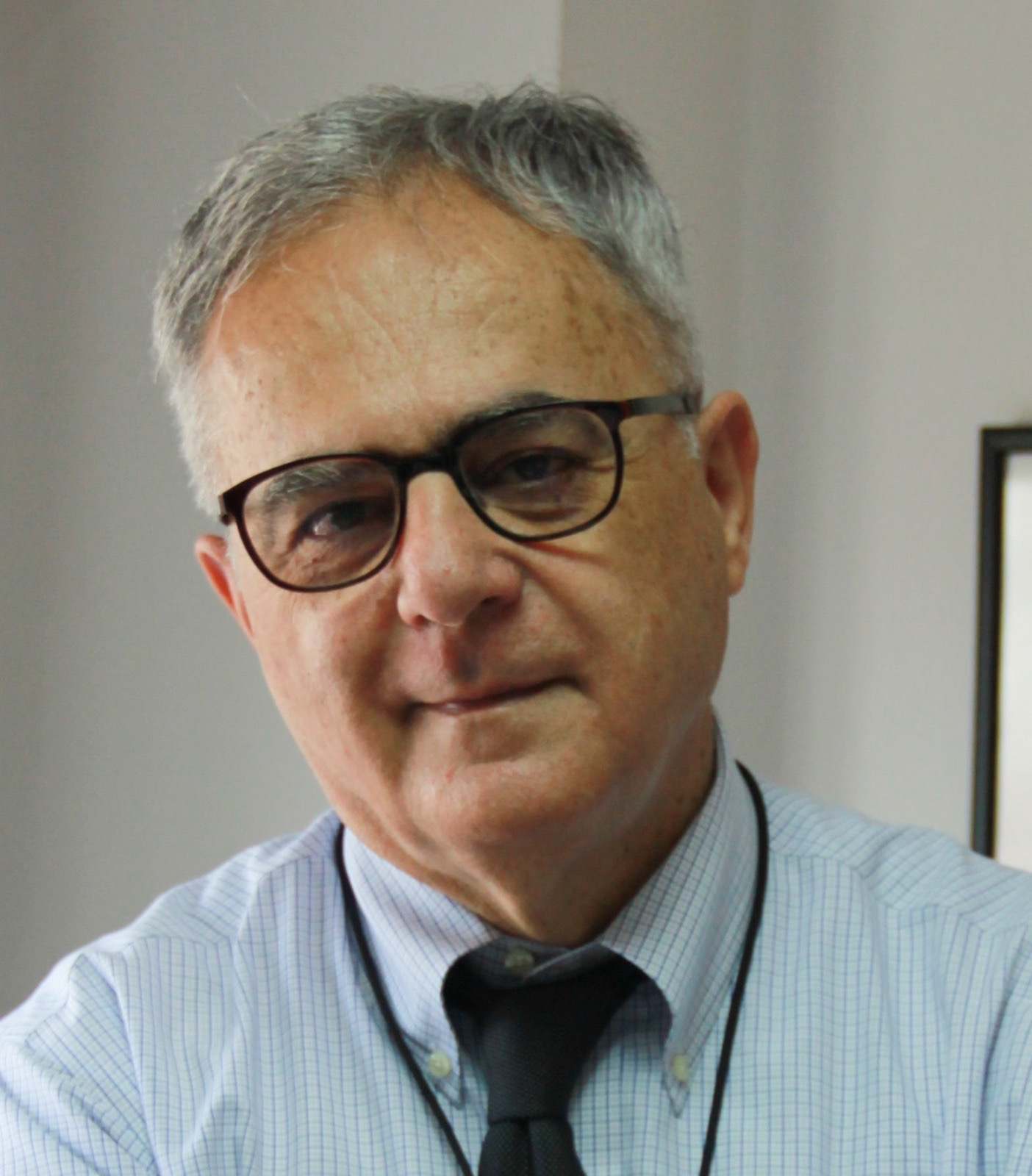
- Born: May 5, 1953 (age 73)
- Occupations: Pediatric neurologist and academic
- Spouse: Rezzan Topaloğlu

Academic background
- Education: Hacettepe University

Haluk Aydın Topaloğlu is a Turkish pediatric neurologist and academic. He is a Professor of Paediatrics and Neurology at Hacettepe University and a Professor of Pediatrics at Yeditepe University.

Topaloğlu's research focuses on pediatric neuromuscular disorders, neurogenetics, developmental aspects of child neurology, and clinical trials in pediatric neuromuscular conditions. He has received the Hacettepe University Award in Medicine in 2002, the 2003 Medical Research Award from the Turkish Scientific and Research Council (TÜBİTAK), and the Gaetano Conte Academy of Myology's Clinical Research Award in 2015.

Topaloğlu is a lifetime member of the Turkish Academy of Sciences (TÜBA) as well as a British Council and Association Française contre les Myopathies (AFM) scholar.

== Education and career ==
Topaloğlu graduated from Hacettepe University School of Medicine in Ankara, Turkey, in 1978 and completed his specialization in Pediatrics at the same institution in 1982. Between 1984 and 1985, he trained in Child Neurology at the Alberta Children’s Hospital, University of Calgary, Canada. He returned back to his original institution Hacettepe as faculty in 1988. Since 1996, he has held the title of Professor of Pediatrics and Neurology in the Department of Pediatrics at the Hacettepe University School of Medicine. He has also been a Professor in the Department of Pediatrics and Child Neurology at Yeditepe University, Istanbul, Turkey.

Topaloğlu served as Secretary of the World Muscle Society (WMS) from 2001 to 2019 and as President of the Gaetano Conte Academy of Myology from 2018 to 2019. He is Co-chair of the ICNA Neurology through Art and Time (NTAT) Humanities Committee.

== Research ==
Beginning in the early 1990s, Topaloğlu and colleagues at Hacettepe Children's Hospital defined over 25 new neuromuscular genetic conditions. These included muscular dystrophies, myopathies, hereditary peripheral neuropathies, ataxias, mitochondrial disorders, and a novel entity related to immunology of muscle. The first one was a series of children with a form of congenital muscular dystrophy, which at the time had a nomenclature of 'Occidental type cerebromuscular dystrophy'. A few years later, he contributed to the identification of the LAMA2 gene as the primary genetic variation in this particular condition. Moreover, his work has spanned clinical and basic research, contributing to the development of novel genetic therapies for pediatric neuromuscular disorders such as spinal muscular atrophy (SMA) and Duchenne muscular dystrophy (DMD). He was involved in a two-part consensus on the standard of care for spinal muscular atrophy, addressing diagnosis, rehabilitation, orthopedic management, nutrition, and emerging treatments.

In a collaborative study, Topaloğlu demonstrated that nusinersen improves motor function and increases survival likelihood in infants with spinal muscular atrophy, particularly when treatment begins early. His work further highlighted that early nusinersen treatment in presymptomatic infants with spinal muscular atrophy has led to significant motor milestone achievements, prolonged survival without permanent ventilation, and emphasized the value of early genetic diagnosis and newborn screening.

Another facet of Topaloğlu's research focused on the relationship between genes and muscular dystrophies and dystroglycanopathies. His work identified mutations in the POMGnT1 gene linked to muscle-eye-brain disease, underscoring disrupted O-mannosyl glycosylation as a mechanism for muscular dystrophy and neuronal migration disorders. He also observed splice site and nonsense mutations in the LAMA2 gene, linking them to laminin α2 deficiency in congenital muscular dystrophy and emphasizing their role in the disorder's pathology. In addition, alongside colleagues, he identified 37 mutations, across five genes associated with dystroglycanopathies.

Between 2018 and 2022, Topaloğlu took part in the international joint Task Force on the diagnosis and management guidelines for Guillain-Barré syndrome and chronic inflammatory demyelinating neuropathies.

== Awards and honors ==
- 2002 – Award in Medicine, Hacettepe University
- 2003 – Medical Research Award, Turkish Scientific and Research Council (TÜBİTAK)
- 2012 – Member, Turkish Academy of Sciences (TÜBA)
- 2015 – Clinical Research Award, Gaetano Conte Academy of Myology

== Selected articles ==
- Topaloğlu, H., Yalaz, K., Renda, Y., Cağlar, M., Göğüs, S., Kale, G., ... & Nurlu, G. (1991). Occidental type cerebromuscular dystrophy: a report of eleven cases. Journal of Neurology, Neurosurgery & Psychiatry, 54(3), 226-229.
- Helbling-Leclerc, A., Zhang, X., Topaloğlu, H., Cruaud, C., Tesson, F., Weissenbach, J., ... & Guicheney, P. (1995). Mutations in the laminin α2–chain gene (LAMA2) cause merosin–deficient congenital muscular dystrophy. Nature genetics, 11(2), 216-218.
- Yoshida, A., Kobayashi, K., Manya, H., Taniguchi, K., Kano, H., Mizuno, M., ... & Endo, T. (2001). Muscular dystrophy and neuronal migration disorder caused by mutations in a glycosyltransferase, POMGnT1. Developmental cell, 1(5), 717-724.
- Finkel, R. S., Mercuri, E., Darras, B. T., Connolly, A. M., Kuntz, N. L., Kirschner, J., ... & De Vivo, D. C. (2017). Nusinersen versus sham control in infantile-onset spinal muscular atrophy. New England Journal of Medicine, 377(18), 1723-1732.
- Mercuri, E., Finkel, R. S., Muntoni, F., Wirth, B., Montes, J., Main, M., ... & Szlagatys-Sidorkiewicz, A. (2018). Diagnosis and management of spinal muscular atrophy: Part 1: Recommendations for diagnosis, rehabilitation, orthopedic and nutritional care. Neuromuscular disorders, 28(2), 103-115.
- Van den Bergh, P. Y., van Doorn, P. A., Hadden, R. D., Avau, B., Vankrunkelsven, P., Allen, J. A., ... & Topaloğlu, H. A. (2021). European Academy of Neurology/Peripheral Nerve Society guideline on diagnosis and treatment of chronic inflammatory demyelinating polyradiculoneuropathy: Report of a joint Task Force—Second revision. Journal of the Peripheral Nervous System, 26(3), 242-268.
- Harper, A. D., Topaloğlu, H., Mercuri, E., Suslov, V., Wu, L., Ayanoglu, C. Y., ... & Clemens, P. R. (2024). Safety and efficacy of viltolarsen in ambulatory and nonambulatory males with Duchenne muscular dystrophy. Scientific Reports, 14(1), 23488.
