= Erdal İnci =

Turkish new media artist (born 1983)

- Born: 1983 (age 42–43)
- Education: Hacettepe University
- Known for: New media art
- Notable work: Taksim Square, The 99 Percent, Centipedes
- Movement: Digital art
- Website: Erdal İnci official website

Erdal İnci (born 1983 in Ankara) is a Turkish new media artist, as well as painter, photographer, filmmaker and Graffiti artist based in Istanbul. He is primarily known for his cloned action looped videos, which are presented online in a reduced GIF format. He studied Painting at the Faculty of Fine Arts at Hacettepe University, graduating in 2005.

== Nature and intent of work ==
İnci describes his works as creating a "human pattern" akin to "a photograph or a painting which is composed of moments." In this way, "the viewer can watch all the time phases in a small amount of time – [...] 1 or 2 seconds." He most often uses himself as the cloned figure, creating what has been called "an army of street performers." Hereby, according to İnci, "[a] single figure is turned into a mass by cloning itself […], an expression of the 21st century's visual bombardment epoch."

These animation works, according to the artist, also address the physics of sound. Cloning motion "fills the frame," making it "perpetual, so the timeline will become like a circle" or "like a tone." The locations selected are almost exclusively public spaces, often well-frequented urban ones that serve as a meeting point or have sociopolitical significance, such as Berlin's Alexanderplatz or Istanbul's Taksim Square.

The artist himself refers to these works as videos rather than GIF animations "because they are originally video works [exhibited] in video format […]," explaining, "There's no difference other than the size of the video."

== Exhibition ==
İnci's broadest exhibition platform is the Internet (in GIF format), a circumstance he sees as positive, stating, "It's really good for me not to have to wait for the audience." Here, as of October 2020, his "Fire staff by Huseyin" has over 220,000 Tumblr notes (likes and reblogs). As well, his artwork been featured as graphic illustration of current affairs by the online version of the German publication Die Zeit (May 2015).

İnci has been the subject of solo exhibitions (the work here in the original HD versions) in Istanbul ("Patterns of Motion," Bauart Gallery, 2013) as well as in Berlin ("The Mass Ornament," Galerie Michael Schultz, 2015). Furthermore, he has participated in numerous mixed exhibitions in Istanbul and Ankara as well as in Miami, ("Moving the Still: A Festival of GIFs,” Miami Art Basel, 2012), Milan and Naples, ("The GIF Wall," Action Gallery, 2013), Utrecht, ("Holland Animation Film Festival," 2014) and Bagnols-sur-Cèze, France ("Trace(s) – Festival des arts numériques," 2014). In addition, İnci's animated loops were presented in German premiere as a special feature of the 10th Berlin International Directors Lounge (February 2014).

On 1 March 2018, İnci's HD video 'Centipedes' went on nightly exhibition as large-scale electronic billboards in Times Square in New York City as part of the program 'Midnight Moment,' where they ran until 31 March 2018.

== See also ==
- Digital art
- Video art
