= Tarsorrhaphy =

Surgical procedure to narrow the eyelid opening

- Specialty: Ophthalmology

Tarsorrhaphy is a surgical procedure in which the eyelids are partially sewn together to narrow the eyelid opening. It may be done to protect the cornea in cases of corneal exposure, as a treatment for proptosis (eye protrusion), for example, Graves' ophthalmopathy, Möbius syndrome and other conditions which cause eyelid paralysis. It is also done to allow or promote corneal healing in cases of corneal injuries and lesions. The procedure is performed on the corner of the eyelid opening. Tarsorrhaphy may be temporary or permanent.

The most common technique for tarsorrhaphy is to partially suture the eyelids, however in some cases the procedure may be performed by partially gluing the eyelids using cyanoacrylate glue, injections of botulinum toxin can be administered to paralyze the upper lid levator muscle, or attaching a weight, often made of gold, to the upper eyelid. The latter technique produces quicker results and immediately improves the quality of life, making it more suitable for patients with cancer.

Complications after surgery include failure to protect ocular or corneal surface, dehiscence, trichiasis, pyogenic granuloma, corneal abrasion, haemorrhage, and infection. In cases of late referral to surgery in patients with thyroid disease, there is an increased risk of corneal ulcers and, consequently, permanent corneal opacity which limited patients' eyesight The vast majority of failed operations have been reported in patients who had ocular surgeries in the past, the rate of failiure is also higher in patients with systemic disorders such as diabetes mellitus and connective tissue disorders.

== See also ==
- Eye surgery
- Keratoconjunctivitis sicca
