= MGM Trio =

Live album by Marilyn Crispell, Gerry Hemingway, and Michael Moore
- Released: 1996
- Recorded: November 28, 1994, and December 23, 1995
- Venue: De Singel, Antwerp, Belgium
- Studio: Nevessa Studio, Saugerties, New York
- Genre: Free jazz
- Length: 53:49
- Label: Ramboy Recordings #09

MGM Trio is an album by pianist Marilyn Crispell, drummer Gerry Hemingway, and reed player Michael Moore. Four tracks were recorded live at De Singel in Antwerp, Belgium on November 28, 1994, while the remaining tracks were recorded at Nevessa Studio in Saugerties, New York on December 23, 1995. The album, which features compositions by Moore, was released in 1996 by Ramboy Recordings. The trio is named after the players' first initials.

== Reception ==
Professional ratings
Review scores
Source	Rating
AllMusic	4.5/5 stars
The Penguin Guide to Jazz	3/4 stars

In a review for AllMusic, Thom Jurek wrote that all of the pieces on the album are "stellar and literally gorgeously played," and commented: "Moore's compositions with their long, lush lines and extended harmonics and colors are perfect for Crispell. She's not a foil here, but a partner...Gerry Hemingway... swings like mad and offers Crispell more room for her expansive chord voicings... This is a wondrous album, full of magic, mystery, and beauty."

The authors of the Penguin Guide to Jazz Recordings described the band as "a group of equals," and noted: "it's Crispell one hears first and last, teasing out the mysterious beauty of songs like 'Temperamental Annie' and 'The Pound Fell Down'."

Writing for Cadence, Dale Smoak stated: "the group dynamic is predominantly light, playful and conversational... It's Moore who keeps the melodicism explicit... As for Crispell and Hemingway, this date is far from the heaviest one they've made, but I expect to play it often."

== Track listing ==
All compositions by Michael Moore.

1. "Real Goods" – 7:18
2. "Temperamental Annie" – 5:38
3. "Sun House" – 3:26
4. "The Pound Fell Down" – 10:50
5. "The Bigger The Dot, The Better The Fishing" – 9:18
6. "Clue?" – 4:00
7. "Tsurau" – 9:18
8. "Squaw Rock" – 3:28

== Personnel ==
- Michael Moore – B♭ clarinet
- Marilyn Crispell – piano
- Gerry Hemingway – drums, marimba, steel drums
