= Bilge Yıldız =

Turkish nuclear engineer

- Born: İzmir, Turkey
- Education: Massachusetts Institute of Technology; Hacettepe University
- Scientific career
- Fields: Nuclear engineering; Materials science
- Workplaces: Massachusetts Institute of Technology; Argonne National Laboratory
- Thesis: Development of a hybrid intelligent system for on-line real-time monitoring of nuclear power plant operations (2003)
- Doctoral advisor: Michael W. Golay

Bilge Yıldız is a Professor of Nuclear Science, and Materials Science and Engineering at the Massachusetts Institute of Technology. She develops new materials for energy conversion in harsh environments. These include solid oxide fuel cells and corrosion-resistant materials for nuclear energy regeneration.

== Early life and education ==
Yıldız was born to two teachers in İzmir, Turkey, who made her appreciate education and hard work. She became interested in science and engineering whilst at primary school and chose to attend the science specialist school in her home town. During school Yıldız worked with a local university on a project to clean the waters in İzmir bay. Yıldız was an exchange student with a farming school in Wisconsin and had the opportunity to visit Fermilab. She spent her summer holidays on the Aegean Sea. Eventually Yıldız studied nuclear engineering at the Hacettepe University, where she particularly became interested in the technology of nuclear engineering. At the time there were not clear career paths for her to pursue this in Turkey, and Yıldız decided to move to the Massachusetts Institute of Technology (MIT). Yıldız earned her PhD at MIT in 2003, and remained there as a postdoctoral research associate.

== Research and career ==
Whilst working as a research scientist at Argonne National Laboratory Yıldız became interested in electrochemistry and surface science. She returned to MIT as the Norman C. Rasmussen Assistant Professor in 2007. Yıldız leads the Laboratory for Electrochemical Interfaces at MIT. Her research considers how surfaces respond to harsh conditions, including high temperatures, reactive gases, mechanical stress and applied fields. She studies what happens to the electrodes in fuel cells and electrolyzers. By studying the reaction and transport kinetics in fuel cells or cells designed for water splitting, Bilgie hopes to suppress the corrosion of these materials. She has developed in situ scanning tunneling microscopy methods to study the atoms at the surface of the electrodes, which often behave differently to those in the bulk. Scanning tunneling microscopes (STMs) can map atomic tomography as well as electronic structure, providing information about the surface morphology and chemical reactivity. The Yıldız modified STM can also create precise dislocations in a material using the STM tip.

Alongside electrochemistry, the Yıldız group develop artificial intelligence and probabilistic methods to try to predict failures in nuclear reactors. In nuclear reactions, metal structures that are critical to safety can degrade due to hydrogen penetration. Hydrogen infiltration can make metals mechanically weak. Yıldız has studied the interaction of hydrogen with the oxides that form on the surfaces of metals. She identified that lattice vacancies can act to trap hydrogen. By identifying the mechanism by which hydrogen enters oxide films, she has designed new alloy compositions that can prevent it. Another challenge for the materials that are used inside power plants is that they can suffer from stress corrosion. Most of these materials are polycrystalline, and the grain boundaries between adjacent tiny crystals can impact a material's response to stress. Yıldız has investigated how grain boundaries and dislocations influence the mechanical and chemical properties of materials. She has demonstrated that dislocations in an atomic lattice can speed up the transport of oxygen ions, increasing the rate of diffusion in fuel cells and oxygen separation membranes.

Her recent work has considered the mechanisms responsible for oxygen reduction kinetics in perovskite oxides, as well as investigating interface chemistries in high power density solid batteries. Yıldız identified that strontium cobaltite can switch between a metallic and semiconducting state using a small voltage, which means that it could be used in non-volatile memory. Yıldız has identified the effects of elastic strain, oxygen pressure and dislocations on the degradation and reactivity of hybrid materials. Her group are contributing to the Mars 2020 Mars OXygen In situ resource utilization Experiment (MOXIE) instrument, which will attempt to make oxygen out of Martian resources. In 2014, Yıldız was awarded tenure at MIT.

=== Awards and honours ===
Her awards and honours include;

- 2006 Argonne National Laboratory Pace Setter Award
- 2011 MISTI Global Seed Fund
- 2012 National Science Foundation CAREER Award
- 2012 International Union of Materials Research Societies Somiya Award
- 2012 Charles W. Tobias Young Investigator Award
- 2018 American Ceramic Society Ross Coffin Purdy Award
- 2021 Fellow of the American Physical Society "for innovative contributions to understanding and manipulating ionic defects and charge transport at electro-chemo-mechanically coupled oxide interfaces and devices"

=== Selected publications ===
Her publications include;

- Yildiz, Bilge (2006-01-01). "Efficiency of hydrogen production systems using alternative nuclear energy technologies". International Journal of Hydrogen Energy. 31 (1): 77–92. Bibcode:2006IJHE...31...77Y. doi:10.1016/j.ijhydene.2005.02.009.
- Yildiz, Bilge (2013-05-17). "Cation size mismatch and charge interactions drive dopant segregation at the surfaces of manganite perovskites". Journal of the American Chemical Society. 135 (21): 7909–7925. Bibcode:2013JAChS.135.7909L. doi:10.1021/ja3125349. PMID 23642000. S2CID 15236168.
- Yildiz, Bilge (2010). "Oxygen ion diffusivity in strained yttria stabilized zirconia: where is the fastest strain?". Journal of Materials Chemistry. 20 (23): 4809–4819. doi:10.1039/c000259c.
