= Moebius syndrome =

Facial muscle paralysis from birth

Möbius syndrome
- Other names: Moebius, Moebius sequence
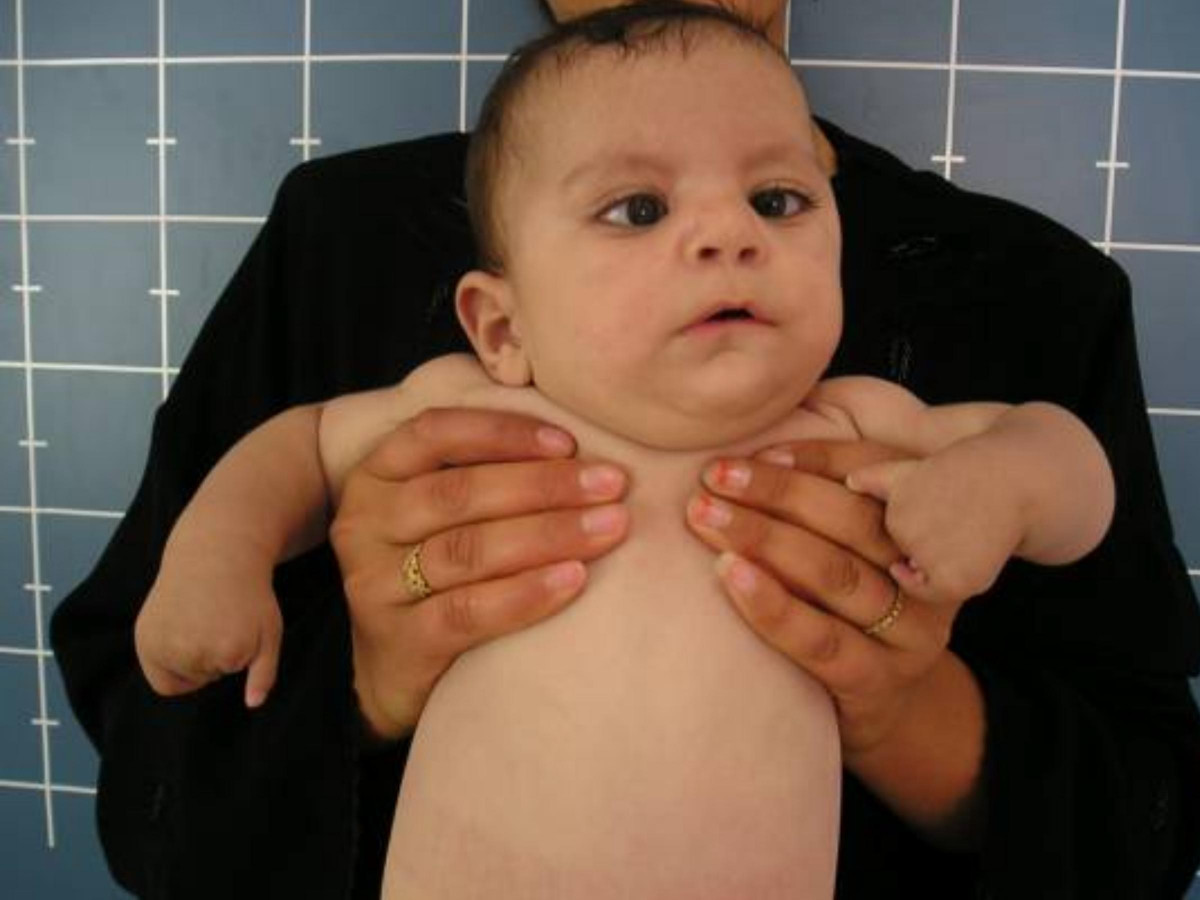
- A child with oromandibular-limb hypogenesis-Möbius syndrome. Notice the expressionless face (due to bilateral VII nerve palsies) and missing fingers.
- Specialty: Medical genetics
- Frequency: 0.005%

Möbius syndrome or Moebius syndrome is a rare congenital neurological disorder which is characterized by facial paralysis and the inability to move the eyes from side to side. Most people with Möbius syndrome are born with complete facial paralysis and cannot close their eyes or form facial expressions. Limb and chest wall abnormalities sometimes occur with the syndrome. People with Möbius syndrome have normal intelligence, although their lack of facial expression is sometimes incorrectly taken to be due to dullness or unfriendliness. It is named for Paul Julius Möbius, a German neurologist who first described the syndrome in 1888. In 1994, the "Moebius Syndrome Foundation" was founded, and later that year the first "Moebius Syndrome Foundation Conference" was held in Los Angeles.

== Signs and symptoms ==
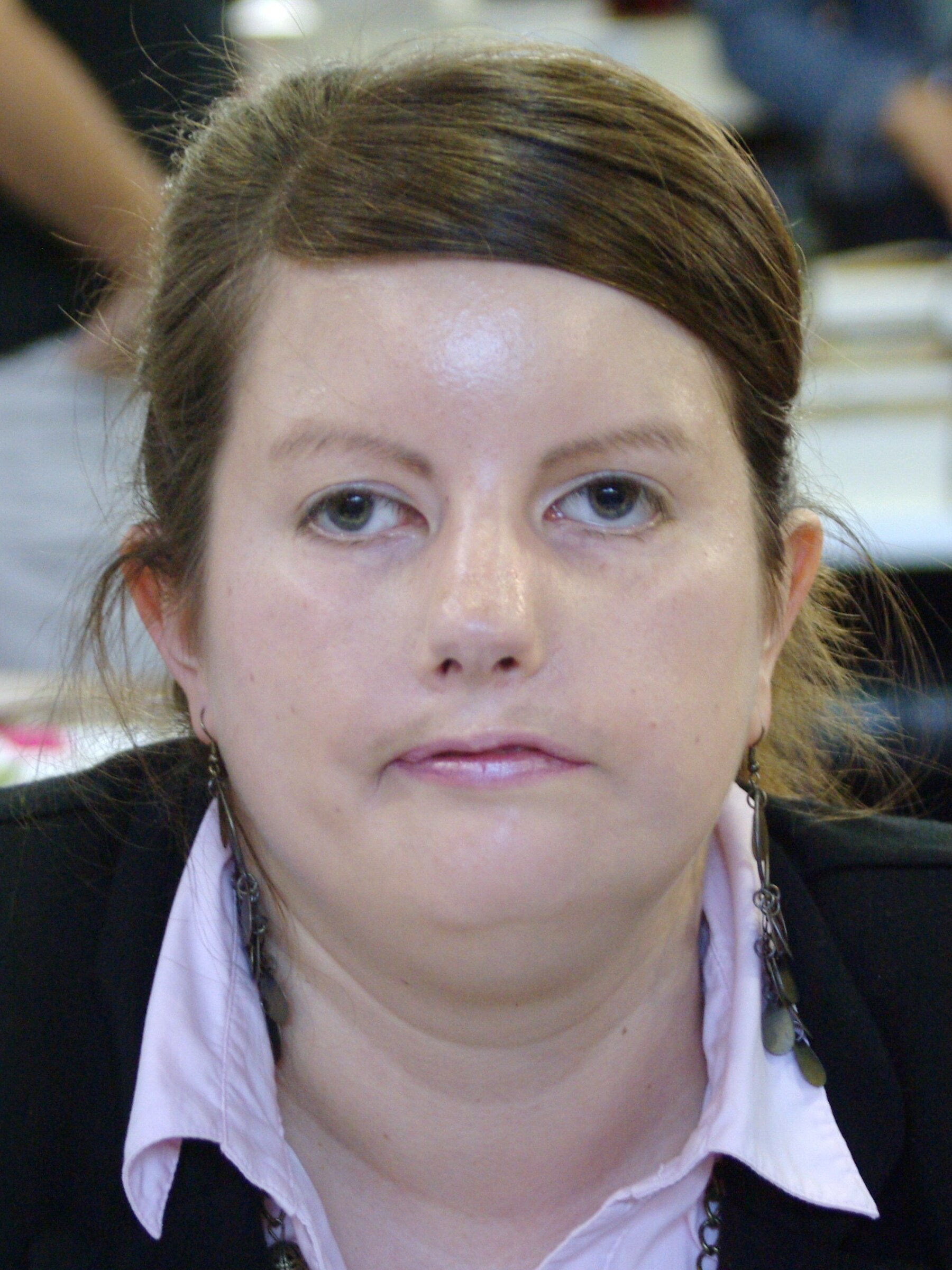
Chilean writer Ana María Haebig has Moebius Syndrome

People with Möbius syndrome are born with facial paralysis and the inability to move their eyes laterally. Often, their upper lip is retracted due to muscle shrinkage. Occasionally, cranial nerves V and VIII are affected.

Other symptoms that sometimes occur with Möbius syndrome are:

- Limb abnormalities—clubbed feet, missing fingers or toes
- Chest-wall abnormalities (Poland syndrome)
- Crossed eyes (strabismus)
- Difficulty in breathing and/or in swallowing
- Corneal erosion resulting from difficulty in blinking

Children with Möbius syndrome may have delayed speech because of paralysis of muscles that move the lips, soft palate and tongue root. However, with speech therapy, most people with Möbius syndrome can develop understandable speech. Möbius syndrome has been associated with increased occurrence of the symptoms of autism.

=== Social and lifestyle effects ===
Möbius syndrome does not prevent individuals from experiencing personal and professional success. Due to the importance of facial expression and smiling in social interaction, the inability to form either can lead to individuals with Möbius being perceived as unhappy, unfriendly or uninterested in conversations. Individuals who are familiar with Möbius patients such as family or friends can recognize other signals of emotion such as body language, to the point that they sometimes report forgetting that the person has facial paralysis. People with Möbius syndrome are often adept at compensating for a lack of expression by using body language, posture, and vocal tone to convey emotion.

== Pathogenesis ==
Möbius syndrome results from the underdevelopment of the VI and VII cranial nerves.

The causes of Möbius syndrome are poorly understood. It is thought to result from a vascular disruption (temporary loss of blood flow) in the brain during prenatal development. There can be many reasons for vascular disruption leading to Möbius syndrome. Most cases do not appear to be genetic. However, genetic links have been found in a few families. Some maternal trauma may result in impaired or interrupted blood flow (ischemia) or lack of oxygen (hypoxia) to a developing fetus. Some cases are associated with reciprocal translocation between chromosomes or maternal illness.

The use of drugs and a traumatic pregnancy may also be linked to the development of Möbius syndrome. The use of the drugs misoprostol or thalidomide by women during pregnancy has been linked to the development of Möbius syndrome in some cases. Studies show that the use of misoprostol during pregnancy increases the risk of developing Möbius syndrome by a factor of 30. While this is a dramatic increase in risk, the incidence of Möbius syndrome without misoprostol use is estimated at one in 50,000 to 100,000 births (making the incidence of Möbius syndrome with misoprostol use, less than one in 1,000 births). The use of cocaine (which also has vascular effects) has been implicated in Möbius syndrome.

=== Oral/dental concerns ===
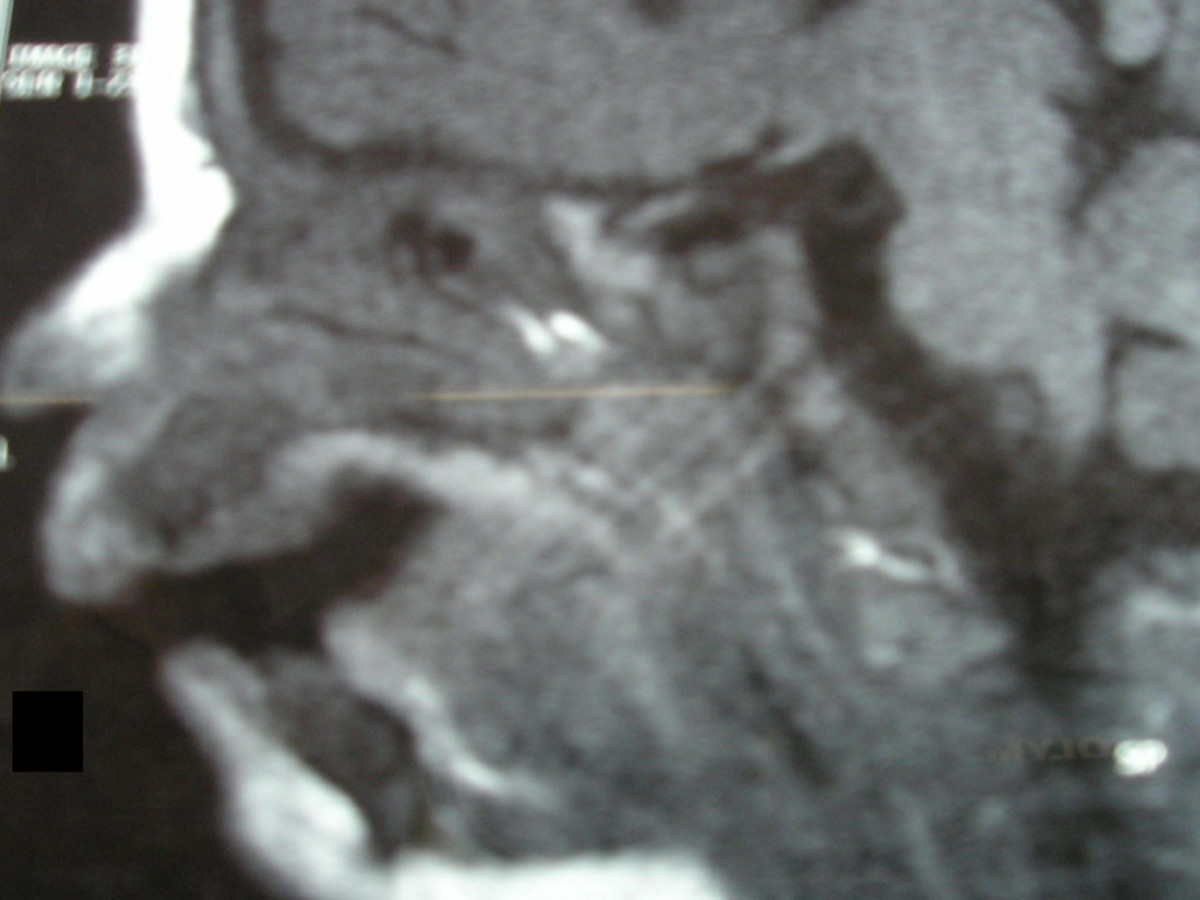
Sagittal magnetic resonance imaging scan showing a markedly underdeveloped (hypoplastic) tongue or Microglossia

==== Neonatal ====
When a child is born with Möbius syndrome, there may be difficulty in closing the mouth or swallowing. The tongue may fasciculate (quiver) or be hypotonic (low muscle tone). The tongue may be larger or smaller than average. There may be low tone of the muscles of the soft palate, pharynx, and the masticatory system. The palate may be arched excessively (a high palate), because the tongue does not form a suction that would normally shape the palate down further. The palate may have a groove (this may be partially due to intubation early on if it is for an extended period of time) or may be cleft (incompletely formed).

==== Primary dentition ====
The primary (baby) teeth generally start coming in by 6 months of age, and all 20 teeth may be in by two and a half years of age. The eruption timing varies greatly. There may be an incomplete formation of the enamel on the teeth (enamel hypoplasia) that makes the teeth more vulnerable to caries (cavities). There may be missing teeth eruptions. If the infant is not closing down properly, the lower jaws become more noticeably deficient (micrognathia or retrognathia). The front teeth may not touch when the child closes down because the back teeth have overerrupted or because of incomplete formation of the maxilla. This condition is called an anterior open bite and has facial/skeletal implications.

==== Transitional dentition ====
Between age 5 and 7, most children start losing their primary teeth. Occasionally, some primary teeth are slow to exfoliate (fall out), and the dentist may want to remove a primary tooth early to prevent orthodontic problems. Likewise, premature loss of primary teeth may create orthodontic problems later on. When a tooth is lost prematurely, removable or fixed spacers may be needed to prevent the shifting of teeth. Interceptive orthodontic treatment can be initiated at this stage of development to help with crowding or to help relate the upper and lower jaws. Consistent with a high palate is a narrow arch shape of the upper teeth as they line up in the mouth. This may cause the upper front teeth to flare out and become more prone to fracture if accidentally hit. Interceptive orthodontics has an important role in this situation. Appliances that expand the upper arch tend to bring the front teeth back into a more-normal position. Some appliances can even help allow the front teeth to close to normal in an open-bite situation. The mouth and lips may tend to get dry with the Möbius patient.

==== Permanent dentition ====
After the last primary tooth is lost, usually around the age of twelve, final orthodontic treatment can be initiated. A patient that has not been able to close or swallow well probably will have an open bite, deficient lower-jaw growth, a narrow archform with crowded teeth, and upper anterior flaring of teeth. Orthognathic (jaw) surgery may be indicated.

Genetic links to 13q12.2 and 1p22 have been suggested.

== Diagnosis ==
Diagnosis is typically made by the physical characteristics and symptoms, patient history and a thorough clinical evaluation. There is no specific diagnostic test that confirms Möbius syndrome. Some specialised tests may be carried out to rule out other causes of facial palsy.

== Treatment ==
There is no single course of medical treatment or cure for Möbius syndrome. Treatment is supportive and in accordance with symptoms. If they have difficulty nursing, infants may require feeding tubes or special bottles to maintain sufficient nutrition. Physical, occupational, and speech therapy can improve motor skills and coordination and can lead to better control of speaking and eating abilities. Often, frequent lubrication with eye drops is sufficient to combat dry eye that results from impaired blinking. Surgery can correct crossed eyes, protect the cornea via tarsorraphy, and improve limb and jaw deformities. Sometimes called smile surgery by the media, muscle transfers grafted from the thigh to the corners of the mouth can be performed to provide the ability to smile. Although "smile surgery" may provide the ability to smile, the procedure is complex and can take twelve hours for each side of the face. Also, the surgery cannot be considered a "cure" for Möbius syndrome, because it does not improve the ability to form other facial expressions.

== Epidemiology ==
It is estimated that there are, on average, 2 to 20 cases of Möbius syndrome per million births. Although its rarity often leads to late diagnosis, infants with this disorder can be identified at birth by a "mask-like" lack of expression that is detectable during crying or laughing and by an inability to suck while nursing because of paresis (palsy) of the sixth and seventh cranial nerves.

== Society and culture ==
Literature and media with mentions of Möbius syndrome include:

- The protagonist of the novel Painted by Eliza Wyatt and Christian Leffler has Möbius syndrome.
- In the second season of Scream Queens, Daira Janessen (Riley McKenna Weinstein), also known as Chanel 8, has Möbius syndrome.
- In “The Adventure of the Man Who Never Laughed”, a story written by John H. Watson, M.D./discovered by J. N. Williamson, and collected in Holmes For The Holidays, edited by Martin H. Greenberg, Jon L. Lellenberg and Carol-Lynn Waugh (Berkley Prime Crime, 1996), a missing person has Möbius syndrome.
- In The Good Doctor (season 1, episode 17, "Smile" released March 19, 2018) patient Gretchen seeks elective surgery for Möbius syndrome.
- In Grey's Anatomy (season 16, episode 21, "Put on a Happy Face") a young girl with Möbius syndrome wishes to undergo elective treatment for her condition.
