= Hacettepe University Medical School =

Coordinates: 39.93164°N 32.86281°E

- Hacettepe Üniversitesi Tıp Fakültesi
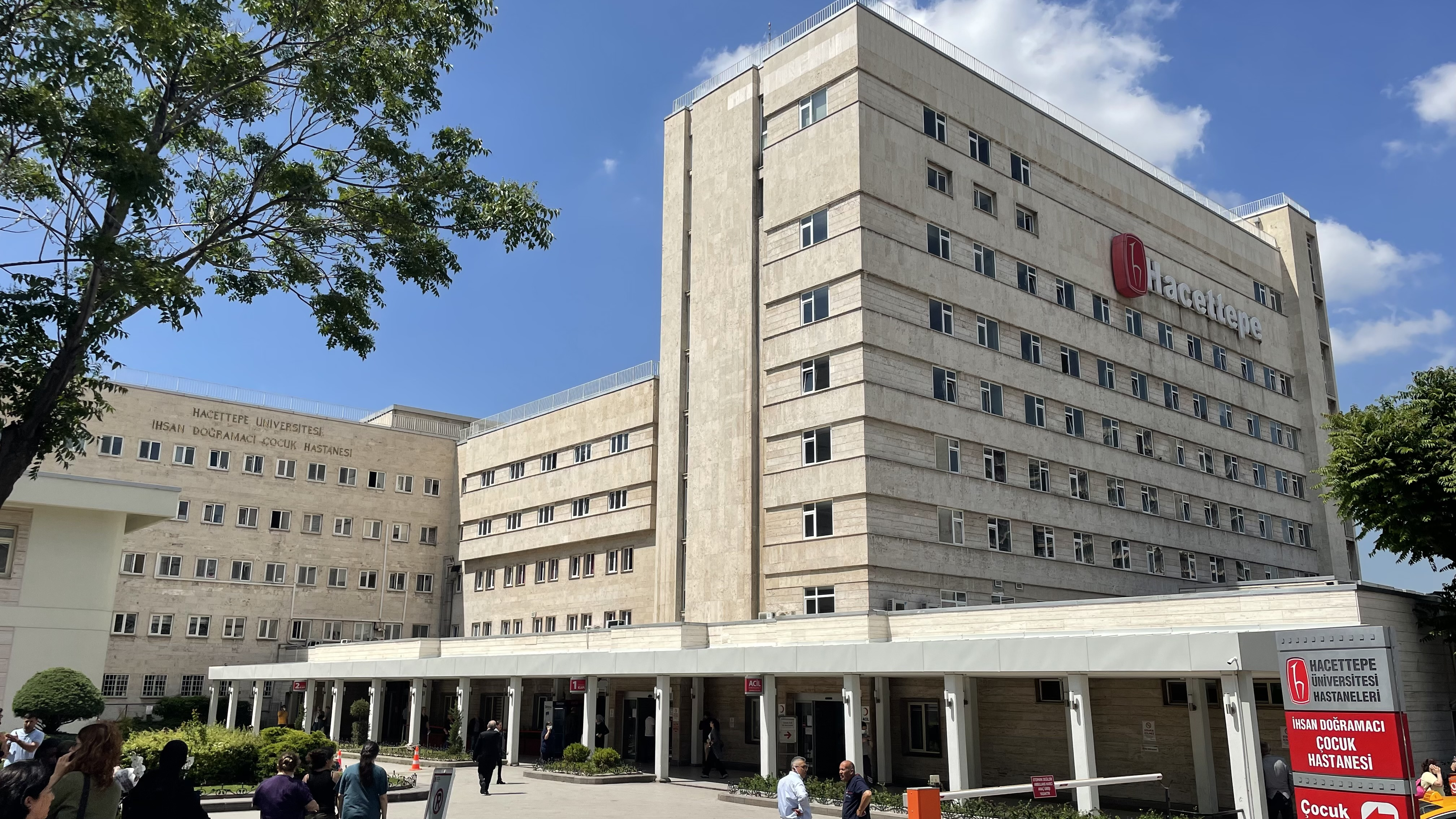
- Motto: "Daha ileriye, hep en iyiye." — İhsan Doğramacı
- Motto in English: "To the leading edge, toward being the best." — İhsan Doğramacı
- Type: Public
- Established: 1967; 59 years ago
- Founders: İhsan Doğramacı
- Affiliations: EUA; JCI
- Dean: Prof. Dr. Deniz Demiryürek
- Location: Ankara, Turkey
- Campus: Urban (210,238 m^{2})
- Mascot: Stag
- Website: tip.hacettepe.edu.tr

Hacettepe University Medical School is a medical school located at Hacettepe University Medical Center in Ankara, Turkey.

== History ==
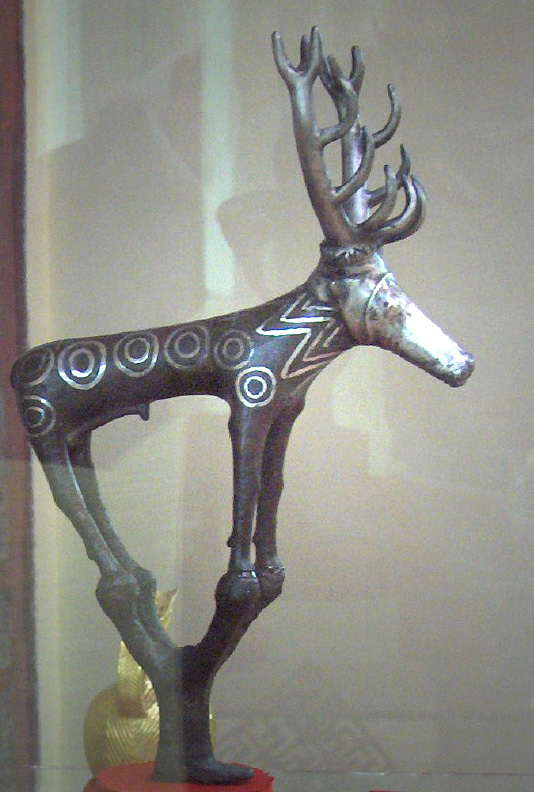
The Hittite stag, which served as the inspiration for the Hacettepe University emblem

Hacettepe University Medical School began with the establishment of The Child Health Department affiliated with Ankara University Medical School on February 2, 1954.

== Official seal ==
The emblem of the university was designed in 1967 by Dr. Yücel Tanyeri, then a second year medical student, in the likeness of a stag, the symbol of a Hittite deity discovered at the royal tombs in Alacahöyük. Inspired by this archeological symbol common to the region, the Stag was chosen as the symbol of the university, and was abstracted to represent a lowercase "h" – the first letter of the university's name.

== Achievements ==
On February 24, 2011, Turkish surgeon Dr. Serdar Nasır and his team successfully performed the country's second full face transplant at the university's hospital in Ankara after almost one month the first transplant of its sort in Turkey. The 25-year-old patient, Cengiz Gül's face was badly burnt in a television tube implosion accident when he was two years old. The donor was 40-year-old N. A. (his family did not allow his identity to be revealed), who experienced brain death two days before the surgery following a motorcycle accident which occurred on February 17.

The surgery team accomplished at the same time another transplant, world's first-ever double-arm and double-leg limb transplant on 25-year old Şevket Çavdar using the organs of the same donor.

== Notable people ==
- Serdar Nasır, Associate Prof. Dr. at Institute of Plastic, Reconstructive and Aesthetic Surgery
