= Hacettepe University =

Major state university in Ankara, Turkey

- Hacettepe Üniversitesi
- Official Emblem Inspired by Hittite Art
- Motto: "Daha ileriye, hep en iyiye." — İhsan Doğramacı
- Motto in English: "To the leading edge, toward being the best." — İhsan Doğramacı
- Type: Public research university
- Established: 1967; 59 years ago
- Founder: İhsan Doğramacı
- Academic affiliations: EUA; JCI
- Rector: Mehmet Cahit Güran
- Administrative staff: 3638
- Students: 49582
- Location: Ankara, Turkey; 39°52′02″N 32°44′04″E
- Campus: Urban, 21 hectares (52 acres) Suburban, 588 hectares (1,453 acres)
- Language: Turkish, English
- Sporting affiliations: Hacettepe Üniversitesi Basketball Club
- Mascot: Stag
- Website: hacettepe.edu.tr

Hacettepe University (Turkish: Hacettepe Üniversitesi) is a public research university in Ankara, Turkey. It was established on 8 July 1967. It is ranked first among the Turkish universities by University Ranking by Academic Performance in 2021.

The university has two main campuses. The first campus, located in the old town of Ankara, hosts the Medical Centre. The second campus, Beytepe Campus, is situated 13 km from the city center. Beytepe Campus spans 6,000,000 m^{2} (600 ha; 1,483 acres) of green land and woodland and houses the faculties of Economic and Administrative Sciences, Law, Education, Engineering, Fine Arts, Letters, and Science. In addition to these two main campuses, the School of Social Work is located in Keçiören, and the Turkish State Conservatory, affiliated with the university since 1982, is situated at the Beşevler Campus. The current rector of the university, appointed by the Presidency on 24 June 2020, is Mehmet Cahit Güran.

== History ==
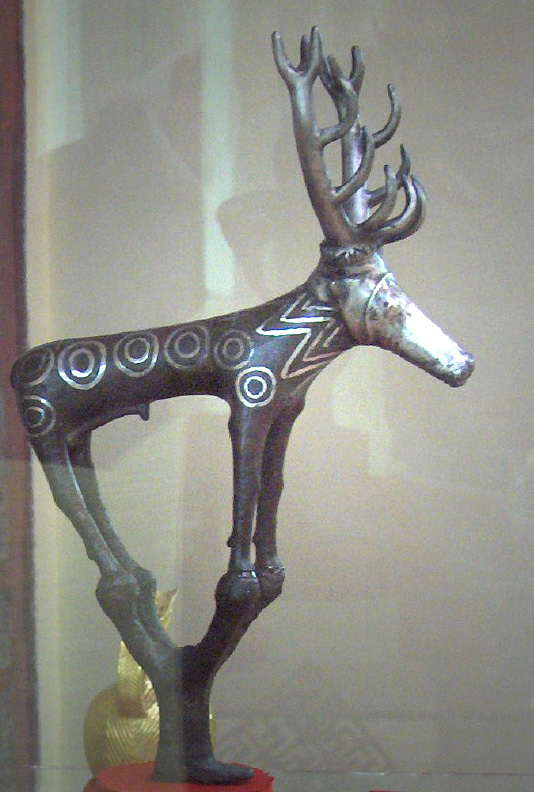
The Hittite stag, which serves as the inspiration for the Hacettepe University emblem, is a symbol derived from ancient Hittite art.

The history of Hacettepe University dates back to the establishment of the Institute of Child Health on 8 July 1958, along with the inauguration of the Hacettepe Children's Hospital, founded by Prof. Dr. İhsan Doğramacı. In 1961, the School of Health Sciences was established, encompassing divisions of Nursing, Medical Technology, Physical Therapy and Rehabilitation, and Nutrition, all centered around the Institute of Child Health.

On 15 June 1963, the Faculty of Medicine at Hacettepe University was founded, accompanied by the construction of a general teaching hospital. Three months later, the School of Dentistry was established. In the summer of 1964, the School of Basic Sciences opened, offering courses in natural sciences, social sciences, and humanities. During this period, all teaching institutions of Hacettepe were affiliated with Ankara University and collectively referred to as the "Hacettepe Science Center."

Hacettepe University was officially established through Act No. 892 of the Turkish Parliament on 8 July 1967. The core institutions of Hacettepe University were the Hacettepe Institutes of Higher Education, and the Faculties of Medicine, Science and Engineering, and Social and Administrative Sciences were founded. In 1969, the School of Pharmacy and the School of Health Administration were established. In 1971, a reorganization led to the elevation of these schools to faculty status, resulting in the creation of the Faculty of Dentistry, Faculty of Engineering, Faculty of Pharmacy, and Faculty of Science. The School of Technology was established in 1973.

In 1982, a further reorganization led to the formation of the Faculty of Letters, Faculty of Education, Faculty of Fine Arts, and Faculty of Economic and Administrative Sciences. Additionally, the Ankara State Conservatory was affiliated with Hacettepe University. In 1984, the School of Health Services was founded, followed by the establishment of the School of Sport Sciences and Technology in 1989. More recently, in 1998, the two vocational schools in Polatlı and the Kaman Vocational School were founded.

=== Official Seal ===
The emblem of the university was designed in 1967 by Dr. Yücel Tanyeri, then a second year medical student, in the likeness of a stag, the symbol of a Hittite deity discovered at the royal tombs in Alacahöyük. Inspired by this archeological symbol common to the region, the Stag was chosen as the symbol of the university, and was abstracted to represent a lowercase "h" – the first letter of the university's name.

== Rankings ==
University rankings

Global – Overall
- ARWU World: 601–700
- CWTS World: 451
- QS World: =571
- RUR World: 391
- THE World: 501–600
- USNWR Global: 532

Regional – Overall
- QS Emerging Europe and Central Asia: 39 (2022)

The Best Global Universities Ranking 2019 of the U.S. News & World Report, Hacettepe University is ranked 532nd (worldwide), and it is ranked first in Turkey and 176th globally in the subject area "Clinical Medicine. In 2019, University Ranking by Academic Performance (URAP) ranked Hacettepe University 534th in the world and best university in Turkey. In QS World University Rankings 2020, it is ranked 320th in the field of "Life Sciences and Medicine". Times Higher Education World University Rankings ranks Hacettepe University 501–600th in the world and 251–300th in the subject are "Clinical, pre-clinical & health" as of 2020. In the Academic Ranking of World Universities 2019, Hacettepe is ranked 301–400th in "Clinical Medicine".

Locally, Hacettepe University Faculty of Medicine is ranked the best in the country. Based on the minimum scores required to enroll in medical school, Hacettepe University holds the top spot among state schools for longer than a decade.

== Campuses ==
=== Main Campus & Medical Center ===
Hacettepe University Medical School on Main Campus, with old Ankara in the background.

Main campus is in Sıhhiye, Ankara. In this campus are the following: Faculties of Dentistry, Faculty of Medicine and Pharmacy, Institutes of Child Health, Health Sciences, Neurological Sciences, Oncology, Public Health and Population Studies, and Schools of Health Administration, HeaIth Technology, Home Economics, Nursing, Physical Therapy and Rehabilitation and Health Services, Teaching Hospitals (the Adult Hospital, İhsan Doğramacı Children's Hospital and the Oncology Hospital), a biomedical library, biomedical research units, student dormitories, sports and recreation centers and clubs.

=== Beytepe Campus ===
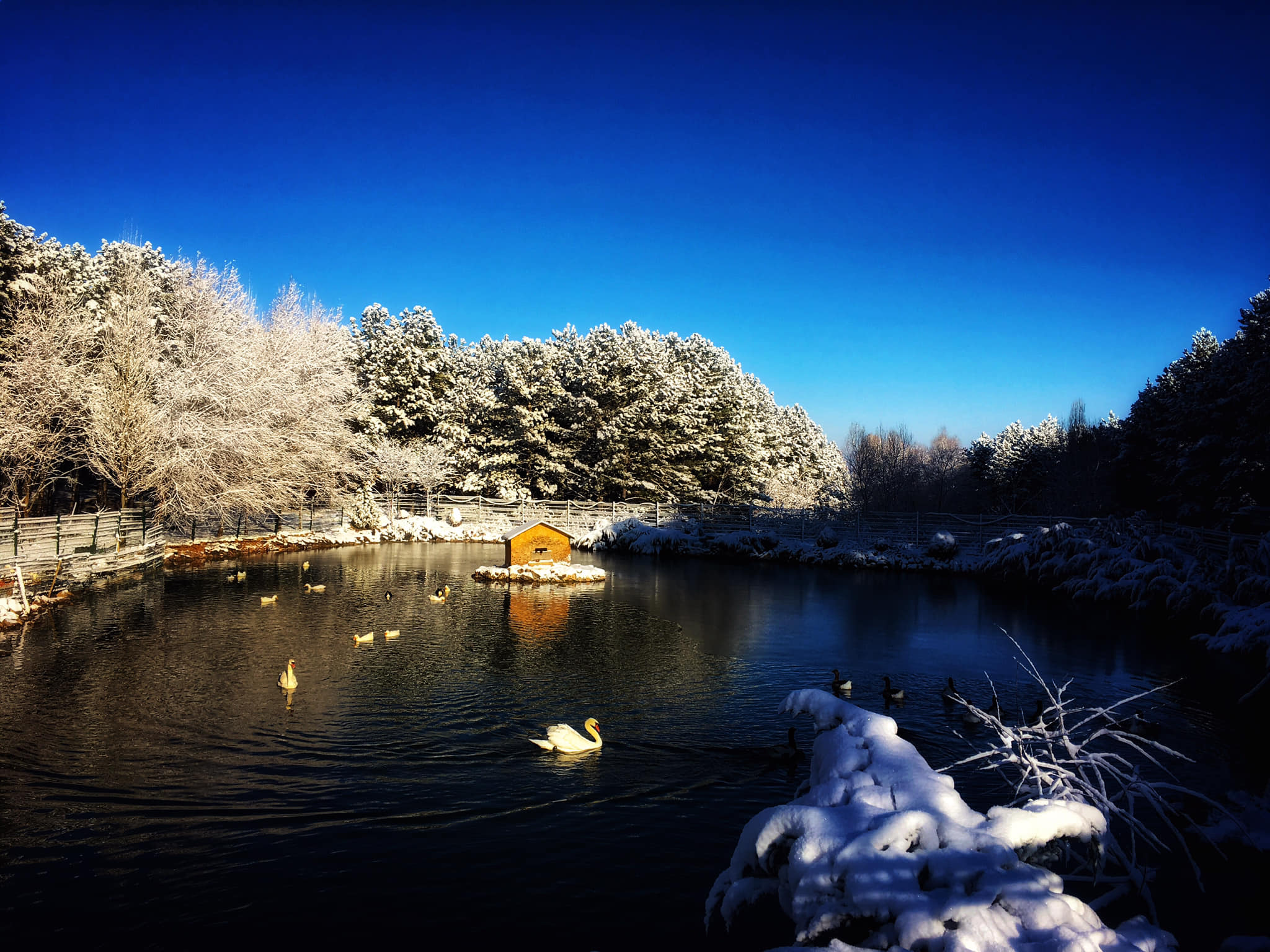
Beytepe Campus in winter

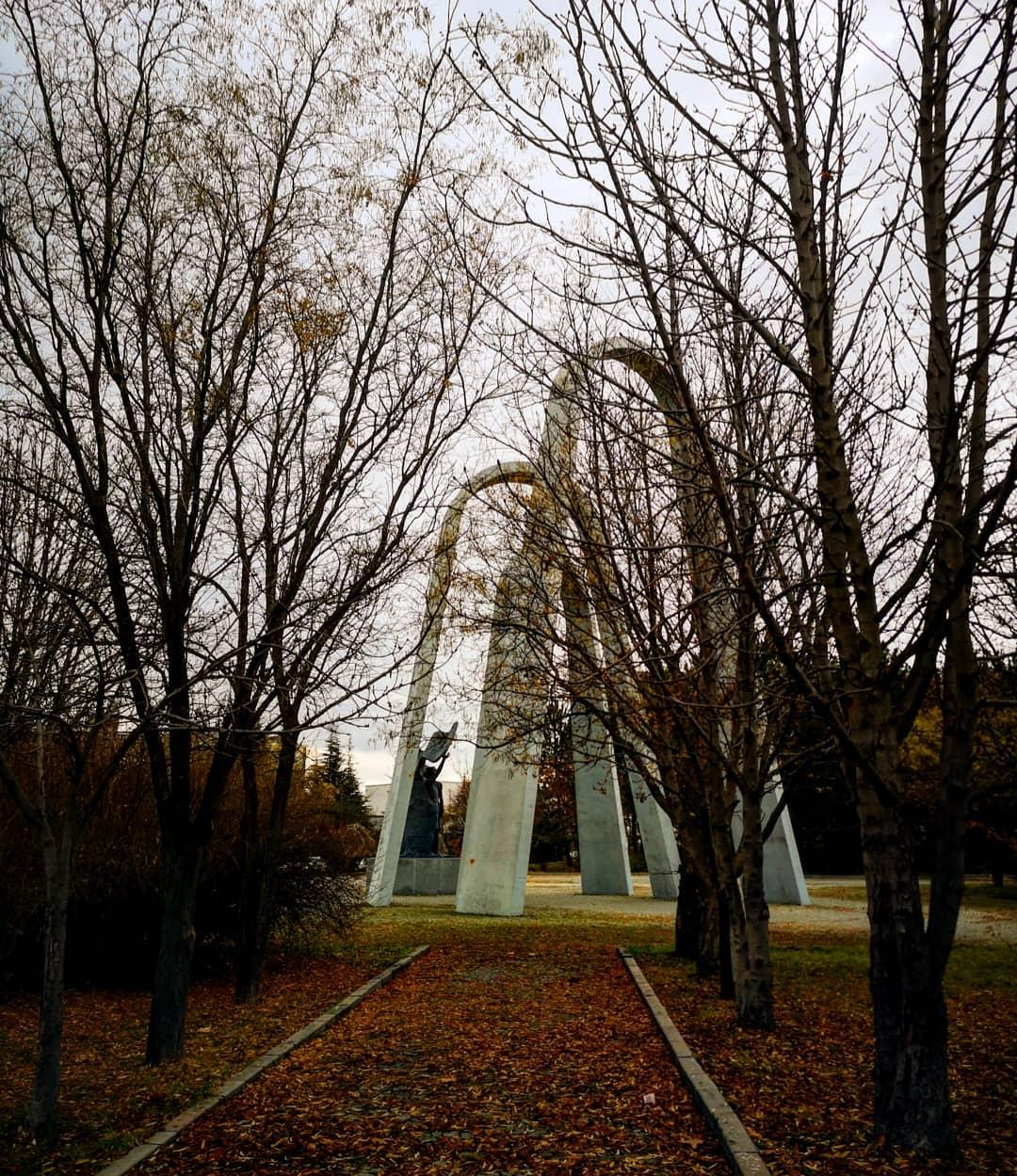
Monument in Beytepe Campus

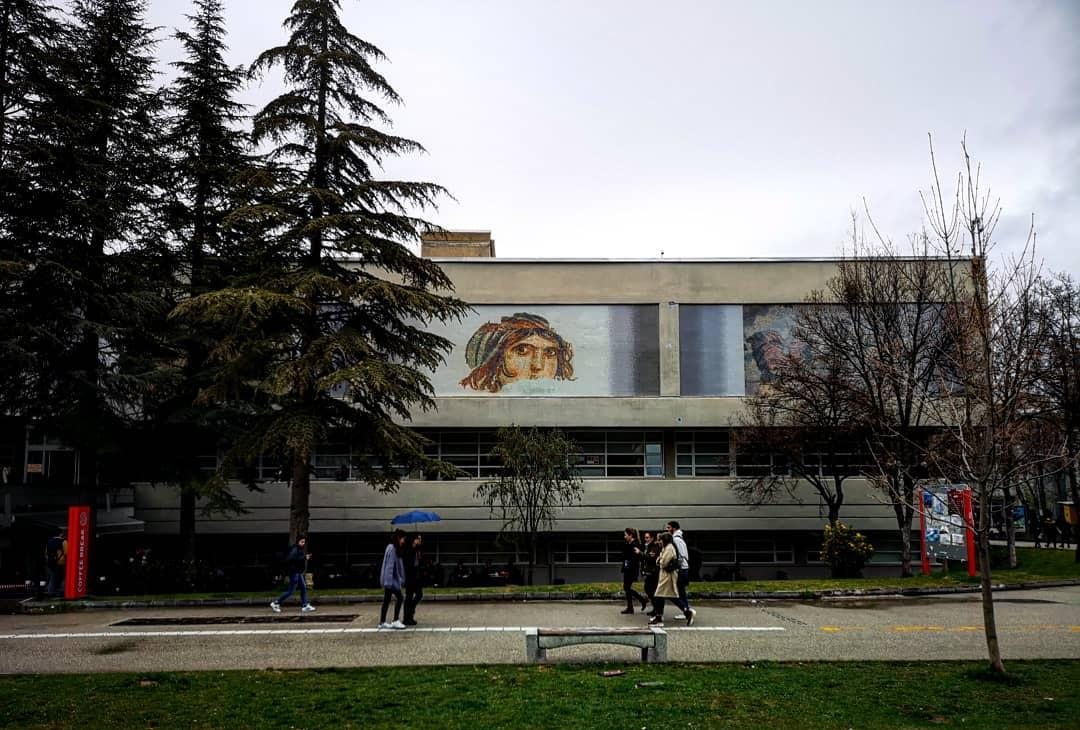
Central Library in Beytepe Campus

The faculties of Economic and Administrative Sciences, Education, Engineering, Fine Arts, Letters and Natural Sciences, Institutes of History of Modern Turkey, Natural Sciences, Nuclear Sciences and Social Sciences and Schools of Foreign Languages, and the Vocational School of Technology, School of Sport Sciences and Technology, and administrative offices, library, student dormitories, sports and recreation centers are on this campus.

Hacettepe University currently has thirteen faculties, eight vocational schools, one conservatory, thirteen institutes and forty one research centres.

Hacettepe University is a state university supported mainly by state funds allocated by the Turkish Parliament. Over 150 different undergraduate degree programs are offered and there are also over 200 different degree programs for postgraduate studies. The university has about 49,582 students enrolled for undergraduate studies and academic staff of 3.600.

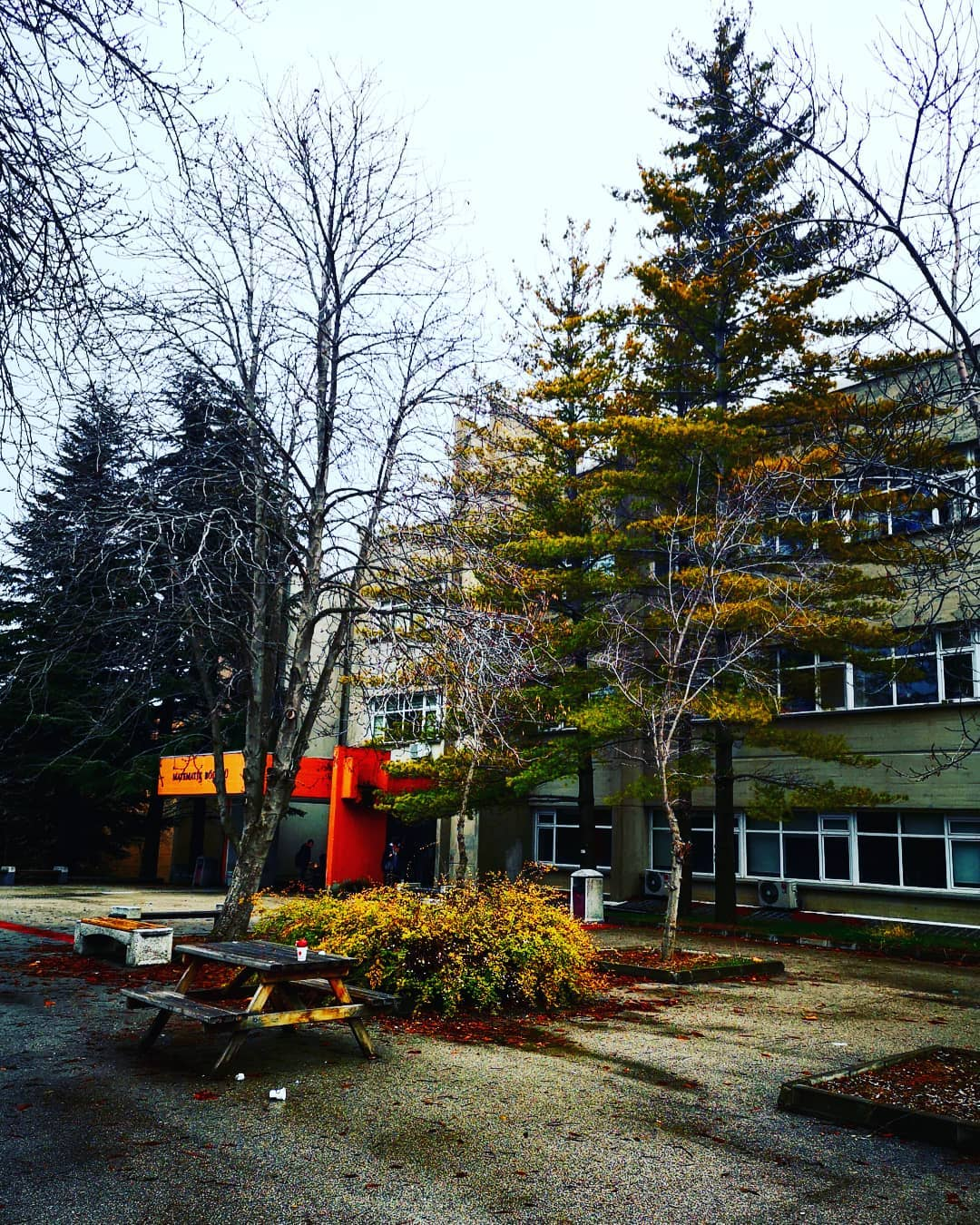
Department of Mathematics, Beytepe Campus

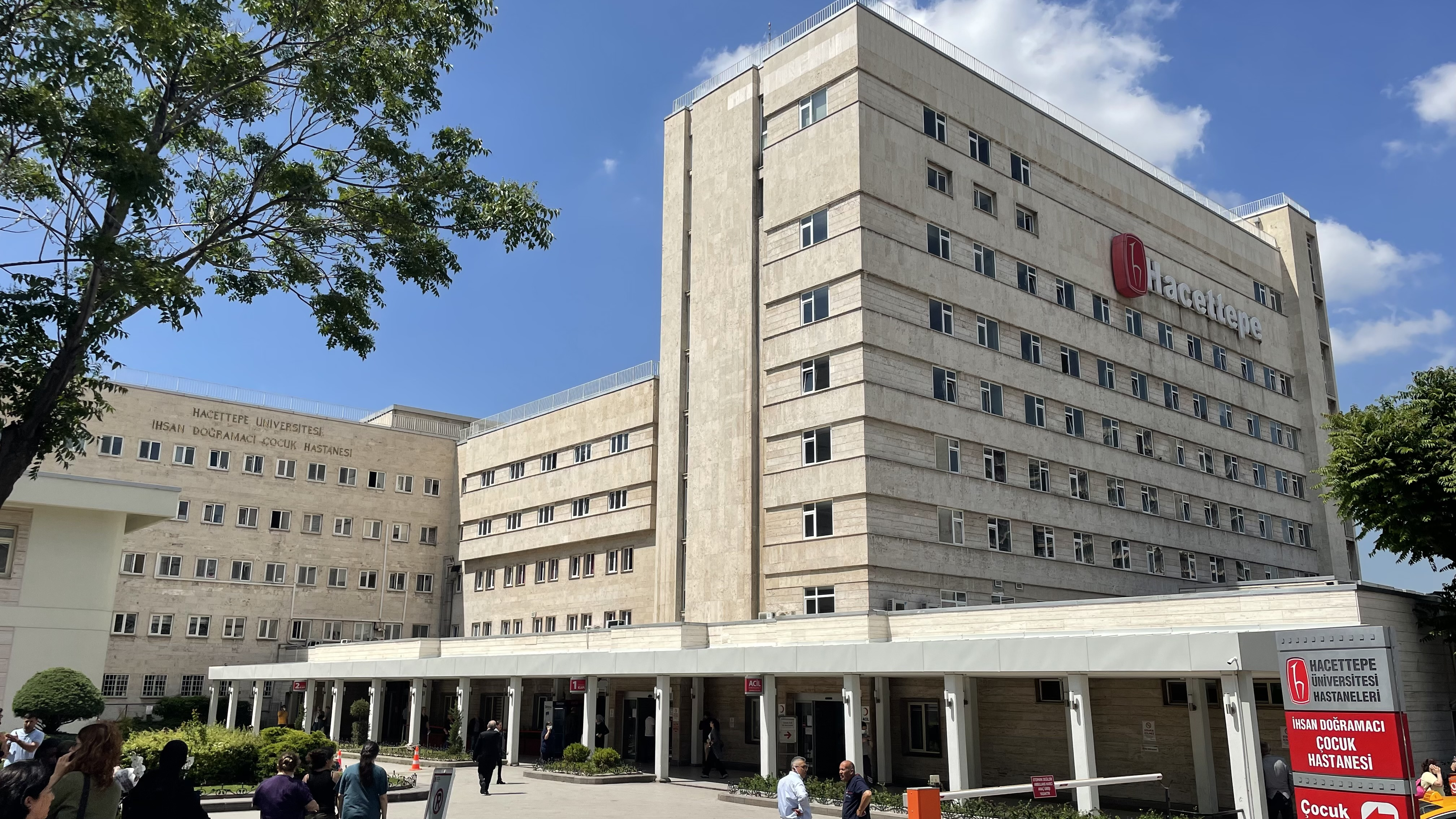
Hacettepe University Medical School

Beytepe Campus also has a large artificial forest, where different sportive activities such as trekking, mountain-biking, running can be done and it is ideal for other recreational activities.

==== The Faculty of Letters ====
The Faculty of Letters was established as the Faculty of Science and Humanities in 1967, inaugurated between 1968 and 1969, and later divided into the Faculty of Literature and the Faculty of Economics and Administrative Sciences on 20 July 1982. It is located at the Beytepe Campus in Ankara and has the highest student population among the university's faculties, with 15 academic units. The faculty has been publishing Edebiyat Fakültesi Dergisi since 1983, a biannual journal that features news and innovations in the humanities, as well as essays by both Turkish and international authors.

=== Other campuses ===
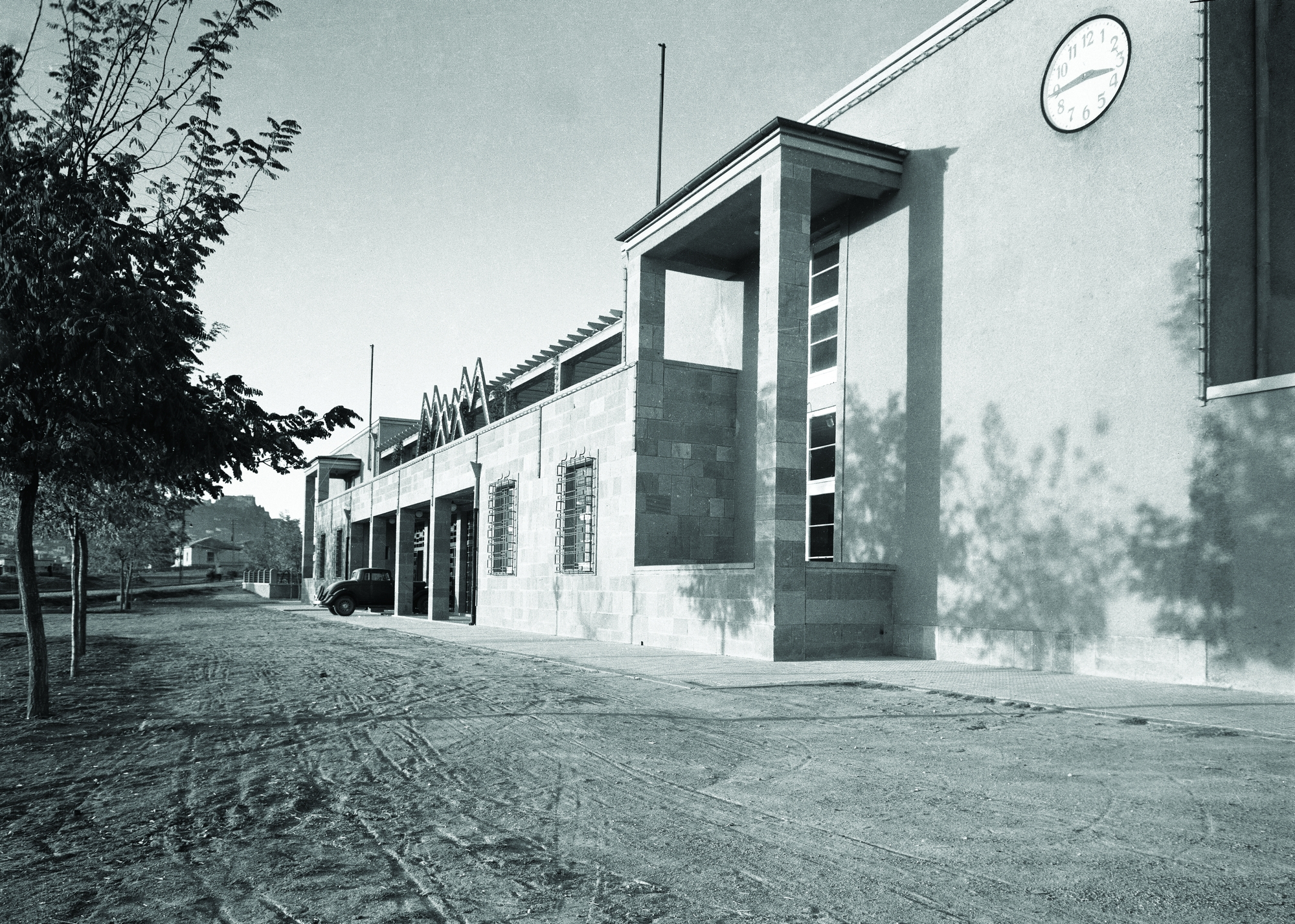
Hacettepe University Ankara State Conservatory in 1930s

- Beşevler Campus: (at the City Center) Houses the Turkish State Conservatory
- Bala Campus: (in Bala, 67 kilometres (42 miles) south of Ankara) Houses Bala Vocational School
- Polatlı Campus: (in Polatlı, a district 55 kilometres (34 miles) west of Ankara) Houses the Technical Sciences Vocational School, Health Services Vocational School

== Academic units ==
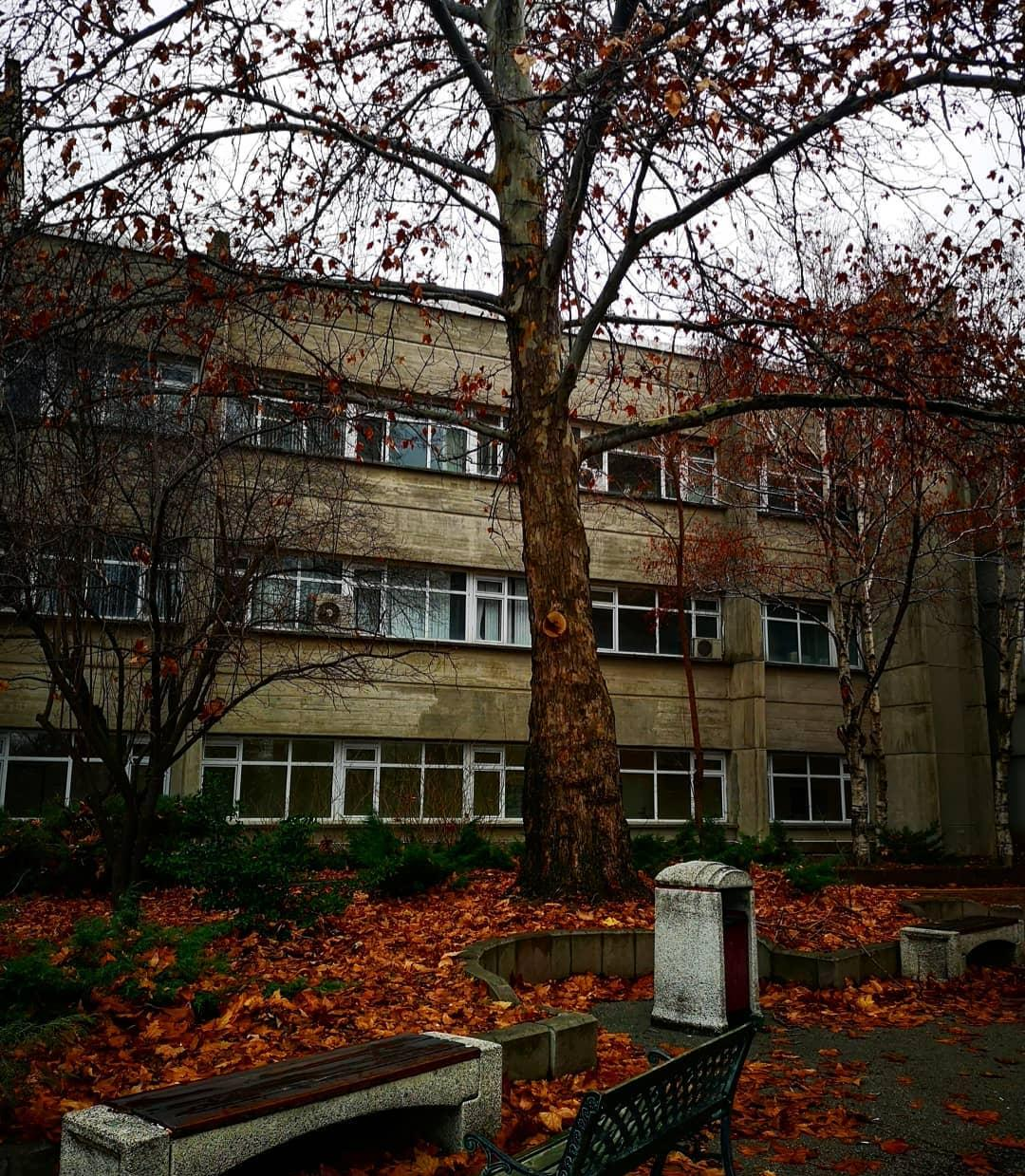
Faculty of Science, Beytepe Campus

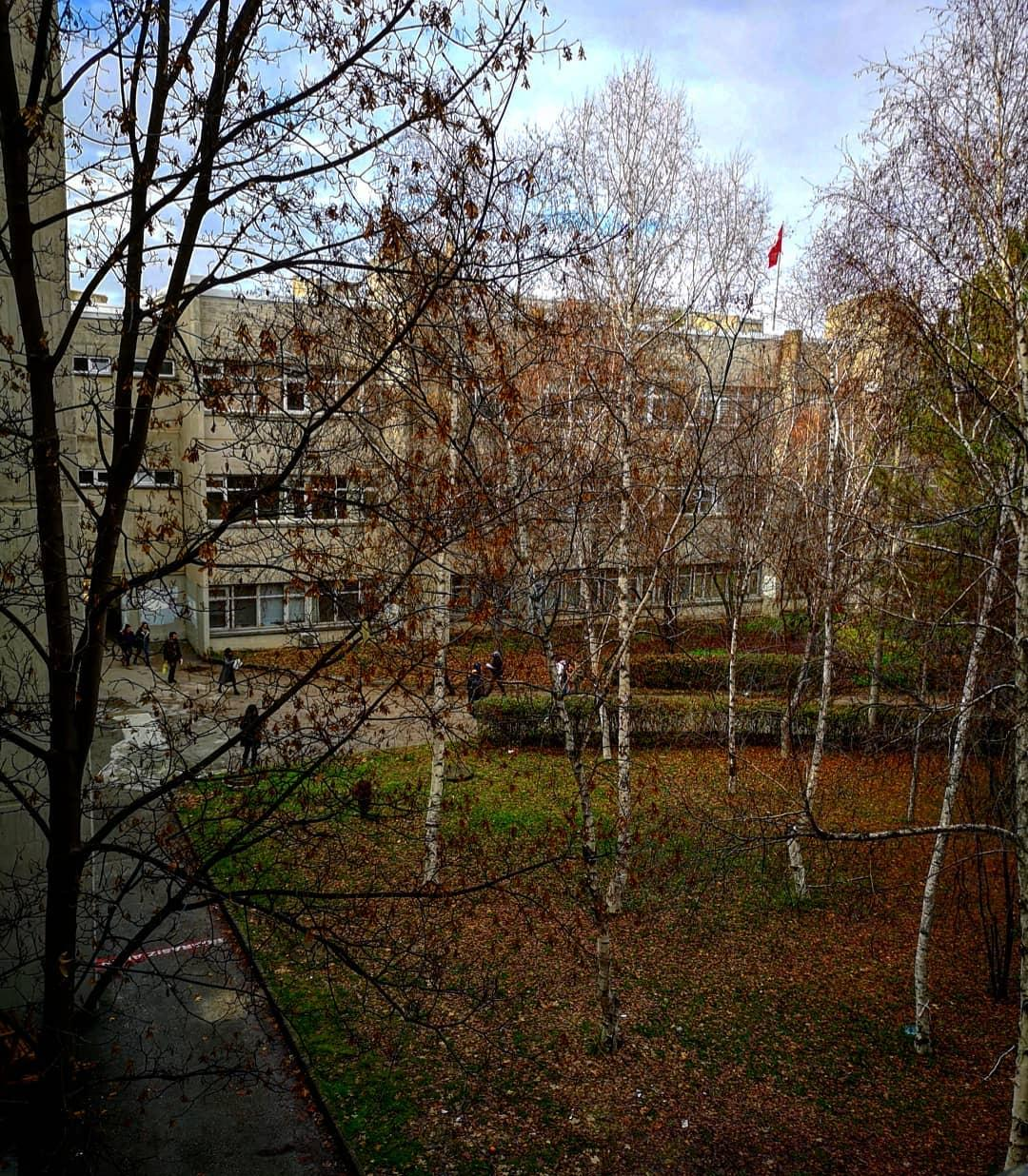
Faculty of Engineering, Beytepe Campus

=== Faculties ===
- Faculty of Medicine (in English and Turkish)
- Faculty of Dentistry
- Faculty of Pharmacy
- Faculty of Communication
- Faculty of Economics and Administrative Sciences: Economics, Business Administration, Family and Consumer Sciences, Health Administration, International Relations, Political Sciences and Public Administration, Public Finance, Social Work
- Faculty of Education: Computer Education and Instructional Technologies
  - Department of Educational Sciences: Curriculum and Instruction, Educational Administration, Supervision, Planning and Economics, Psychological Counselling and Guidance, Testing and Evaluation in Education
  - Department of Foreign Languages Teaching: English Language Teaching, French Language Teaching, German Language Teaching
  - Department of Primary Education: Elementary Teaching, Mathematics Teaching, Pre-School Teaching, Science Teaching
  - Department of Science and Mathematics for Secondary Education: Biology Education, Chemistry Education, Mathematics Education, Physics Education
- Faculty of Engineering: Chemical Engineering, Computer Engineering, Electrical & Electronics Engineering, Environmental Engineering, Food Engineering, Geological Engineering, Geomatics Engineering, Hydrogeological Engineering, Industrial Engineering, Mining Engineering, Nuclear Engineering, Physics Engineering, Mechanical Engineering, Artificial Intelligence Engineering
- Faculty of Fine Arts : Ceramics and Glass, Graphic Design, Interior Architecture And Environmental Design, Painting, Sculpture
- Faculty of Health Sciences: Child Development, Nutrition and Dietetics, Occupational Therapy
- Faculty of Law
- Faculty of Physical Therapy and Rehabilitation
- Faculty of Letters: American Culture and Literature, Archaeology, English Language and Literature, French Language and Literature, German Language and Literature, History, History of Art, Information Management, Linguistics, Philosophy, Psychology, Sociology
  - Translation and Interpreting: English Translation and Interpreting, French Translation and Interpreting, German Translation and Interpreting
  - Turkish Language and Literature
  - Turkish Folkloristics
- Faculty of Science: Actuarial Sciences, Biology, Chemistry, Mathematics, Statistics
- Faculty of Nursing

=== Institutes ===
- Vaccine Institute
- Ataturk Institute
- Institute of Informatics
- Institute of Child Health
- Graduate School of Education Sciences
- Graduate School of Science and Engineering
- Institute of Fine Arts
- Public Health Institute
- Cancer Institute
- Institute of Neurological Sciences and Psychiatry
- Institute of Population Studies
- Institute of Nuclear Sciences
- Graduate School of Health Sciences
- Graduate School of Social Sciences
- Institute of Turkish Studies

=== Conservatory ===
- Ankara State Conservatory

=== Applied Schools ===
- School of Foreign Languages: Basic English Division, English Preparatory Division, German Preparatory Division, French Preparatory Division

=== Vocational Schools ===
- Vocational School of Social Sciences
- Vocational School of Health Services
- Başkent OSB Technical Sciences Vocational School
- Hacettepe ASO 1st OSB Vocational School

== Notable people ==
=== Alumni ===
- Bilge Yıldız – Associate Professor of Nuclear Science and Engineering at Massachusetts Institute of Technology
- Erkan İbiş – Former Rector of Ankara University
- Erdal Beşikçioğlu – Actor and former mayor of Etimesgut
- Uğur Erdener – Physician specialized in ophthalmology and professor
- Çağrı Erhan – Rector of İstanbul Altınbaş University
- Erdal İnci – New media artist
- Tekin Bingöl – Politician and doctor
- Canan Dağdeviren – Assistant Professor at MIT Media Lab
- Haluk Topaloglu - Professor of Paediatrics and Neurology at Hacettepe University and a Professor of Pediatrics at Yeditepe University
- Esra Bilgiç Töre – Actress
- Burcu Özberk – Actress
- Kayra – Rapper

== See also ==
- List of universities in Ankara
- List of universities in Turkey
