= Islak Köpek =

- Origin: Istanbul, Turkey
- Genres: Free Improvisation
- Years active: 2005 – present
- Labels: A.K. Müzik, Evil Rabbit Recordings, re:konstrukt
- Members: Şevket Akıncı; Korhan Erel; Robert Reigle; Volkan Terzioglu; Gülşah Erol; Giray Gürkal
- Past members: Dirk Stromberg; Volkan Ergen; Dilek Acay; Kevin William Davis; Gülşah Erol; Performed/Recorded with Le Quan Nihn, Kirstie Simson, Jose Blasco, Alex Toisoul, Florent Merlet, Senol Küçükyıldırım, Christian Asplund, Richard Nunns, Talin Buyukkurkciyan, Yanaël Plumet, Jürg Solothurnmann, Mark Alban Lotz, Anıl Eraslan, Serra Yılmaz
- Website: Islak Köpek

Islak Köpek is a free improvisation band from Istanbul, Turkey. Its current members are Robert Reigle, Volkan Terzioglu, Sevket Akinci, Korhan Erel, Giray Gürkal.

Islak Köpek's original lineup of Korhan Erel, Şevket Akıncı, Volkan Terzioğlu and Volkan Ergen had their first performance in the summer of 2005. Following a series of performances at Galata Perform and Jazz Cafe in Istanbul, Dirk Stromberg and Robert Reigle joined the band in January 2006. The six-piece band played regular performances at Galata Perform as well as other venues and also did some recordings. Volkan Ergen left in the summer of 2006 to pursue other musical interests. The five-piece band played at Transit Improvisation Days Istanbul 2006 with Le Quan Ninh, Kirstie Simpson, Talin Buyukkurciyan, and Yanaël Plummet and then again in 2007, a sold-out concert at the Akbank Jazz Festival in September 2006, at the A.M.B.E.R. Body-Process Arts Festival in 2007, The Triangle Project (a side project of the 10th Istanbul Biennial in 2007). Dirk Stromberg had to take a leave from the band to pursue his teaching career outside Turkey. With the emergence of Gitar Cafe, a cosy music venue in the Asian part of Istanbul, as a haven from experimental music, Islak Köpek started playing there regularly. Islak Köpek have released their first, self-titled album in December 2008 on the Turkish label “AK Müzik” that featured Korhan Erel, Şevket Akıncı, Volkan Terzioğlu, Volkan Ergen, Robert Reigle and Dirk Stromberg. A quintet recording in 2007 'one year later, two years ago' was released on the Turkish netlabel re:konstrukt in 2009. It featured all musicians on the first album minus percussionist Volkan Ergen. Violinist and visual artist Dilek Acay joined the band briefly in 2008, with cellist Kevin William Davis joining soon after in 2009. Islak Köpek recorded an album with flautist Mark Alban Lotz in Istanbul in 2010, which was released on the Dutch label Evil Rabbit Records in early 2011. This album featured the quintet on the second album and Lotz on flutes.

Islak Köpek has played several concerts at the Borusan Music House in Istanbul as well as a second appearance in the Akbank Jazz Festival in 2012 with acclaimed actress Serra Yılmaz.

Founding member Korhan Erel took a long-term break from the band in 2013 to focus on other projects, which resulted in the band being less active since mid-2013.

The band members have been doing a show on free improvisation and free jazz called “The Other Jazz” on Acik Radyo (FM 94.9) since May 2006.

Islak Köpek members (in alphabetical order as of 2014):

Şevket Akıncı: Acoustic and electric guitar
Korhan Erel: Computer, controllers, melodica
Giray Gürkal: Electric guitar, effects
Robert Reigle: Tenor saxophone
Volkan Terzioğlu: Tenor saxophone
