= Korhan Erel =

Korhan Erel (1973, Istanbul) is a musician, improviser, sound designer based in Berlin.

Korhan plays instruments they design on a computer or other electronic instruments by employing various controllers. They are a founding member of Islak Köpek, Turkey's pioneer free improvisation group, which is regarded as the band that started the free improvisation scene in Turkey. They compose and design sounds for dance, theater, installations and film, and collaborate with dancers, video artists, and spoken word artists.

== Early life ==
Korhan Erel was born on 26 August 1973 to Şaziye Erel and Recep Celil Erel. At the time, Şaziye Erel was working in the Turkish Customs as a clerk, while Recep Celil was working in Anadolu Sigorta. Şaziye Erel's first memory of Korhan's deep interest in sounds was when Korhan as a toddler would make her take them to a bathroom (either their own or their host's bathroom) and there she would have to flush the toilet numerous times while Korhan listened to the flushing of the water and the refilling of the reservoir. If she stopped before Korhan had heard enough, Korhan would cry and she'd have to continue, during a serious financial crisis in mid-70s Turkey where even water was rationed and sparse.

After elementary school, Korhan studied secondary and high school at Robert College, an American-Turkish secondary education institution in Istanbul, from 1985 until 1991. During this period, they had their first computer, a Commodore 64, in the summer of 1985. After a year of only playing computer games, Korhan realized the incredible sounds the computer was able to produce, and started to learn coding. With the Commodore 64, they was not able to go a great distance, but the Commodore Amiga they bought in 1989 changed things forever with its sample playback capability.

== Selected Projects ==
=== David Rothenberg and Korhan Erel – Berlin Bülbül ===
David Rothenberg met Erel during their one-year residency in Berlin. Berlin is one of the most important cities in Europe for nightingales, which is one of the key routes of immigration from Africa through Europe in the spring. David Rothenberg and Erel started to improvise with nightingales in Berlin's parks at midnight. The first concert held on 9 May 2014 and this concert's recordings were used for the album Berlin Bülbül in 2015. The album launch concerts took place in Borusan Music House (Istanbul) on 3 April 2015 and in Sammlung Hoffman (Berlin) on 10 May 2015.

Since 2014, Rothenberg and Erel have been playing with nightingales every May in Berlin.

=== The Liz ===
The Liz is a power trio comprising Liz Allbee (amplified trumpet, voice, text, video, stage design), Liz Kosack (synthesizer, voice, masks, puppets) and Korhan Liz Erel (computer, electronics, sound design, voice). The project is the story of transformations and multiples: a maiden Sphinx, Anubis the dog of death, and Oedipus, as narrated by Kathy Acker. Drawing from traditional Greek myth, as well as Jean Cocteau's 'Infernal Machine' and Acker's 'Blood and Guts in High School', The Liz translates the riddles of the Sphinx into an engine for the musical re-production of resistance, and of subliminal and mythic resonance.

The Liz premiered "Book of Birds" at Quiet Cue on 30 April 2016. It is also performed at Moers Festival in 2016 summer and broadcast live via Arte television channel online.

=== A Christmas Cage: tribute to John Cage ===
Korhan Erel and Tanya Kalmanovitch organized a concert in remembrance of John Cage in his 100th birth year in 2012. The tribute concert included performances of pieces from Cage's Songbooks by Tanya Kalmanovitch, Anthony Coleman, Serra Yılmaz, Tolga Tüzün, Ayşenur Kolivar, Gökçe Akçelik, Şevket Akıncı and Korhan Erel on 29 December 2012 at Borusan Music House.

== Albums ==
Year	Title	Musicians	Label
Physical Releases			
2018	leben nebel	Udo Schindler, Korhan Erel	Creative Sources
2018	SoundEnergyTransformation	Udo Schindler, Sebi Tramontana, Korhan Erel	FMR Records
2017	Humanoise Tutti	Korhan Erel, Elena Margarita Kakaliagou, Jonas Kocher, Hannah Marshall, Dirk Marwedel, Theo Nabicht, Ulrich Phillipp, Ernesto Rodrigues, Wolfgang Schliemann, Nicolas Souchal	Creative Sources
2015	Berlin Bülbül	David Rothenberg, Korhan Erel	Gruenrekorder
2014	Live at Zaal100	W. Wierbos, W. de Joode, Ş. Akıncı, G. Gürkal, K. Erel	Müzik Hayvanı
2014	Bad Falling Bostel	Gunnar Lettow & Korhan Erel	Creative Sources
2012	Three States of Freedom	Tom Soloveitzik, Kevin Davis, Korhan Erel	Creative Sources
2011	Istanbul Improv Sessions 4 May	Mark Lotz & Islak Köpek	Evil Rabbit Records
2011	Live	Nikos Kyriazopoulos & Korhan Erel	Kukuruku Records
2008	Islak Köpek	Islak Köpek	A.K. Müzik
Digital Releases			
2016	Animal Music: Live at Jää-äär	Elliott Sharp, David Rothenberg, Lasse-Marc Riek, Korhan Erel	tokafi
2014	Live at Gitar Cafe	Canned Fit, Yannis Saxonis, Korhan Erel	Gronde Murmure
2012	Superimposed Circumstances	Korhan Erel & Tolga Tüzün	Another World
2011	Public Computing	Korhan Erel	Electronic Muzik
2009	One year later, two years ago (double album)	Islak Köpek	Bandcamp
2006	Con-structures	Korhan Erel	Bandcamp
Compilations			
2010	Aleksey Borisov / Olga Nosova – Istanbul 2010: World Cup	VA	
2016	An Anthology of Turkish Experimental Music 1961–2014	VA	Sub Rosa
