= 2019 İzmir mayoral election =

Government Mayoral Elections

← 2014	31 March 2019	2024 →
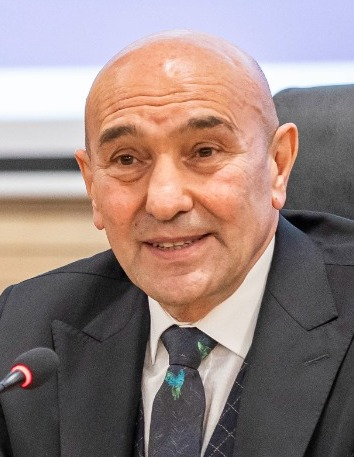

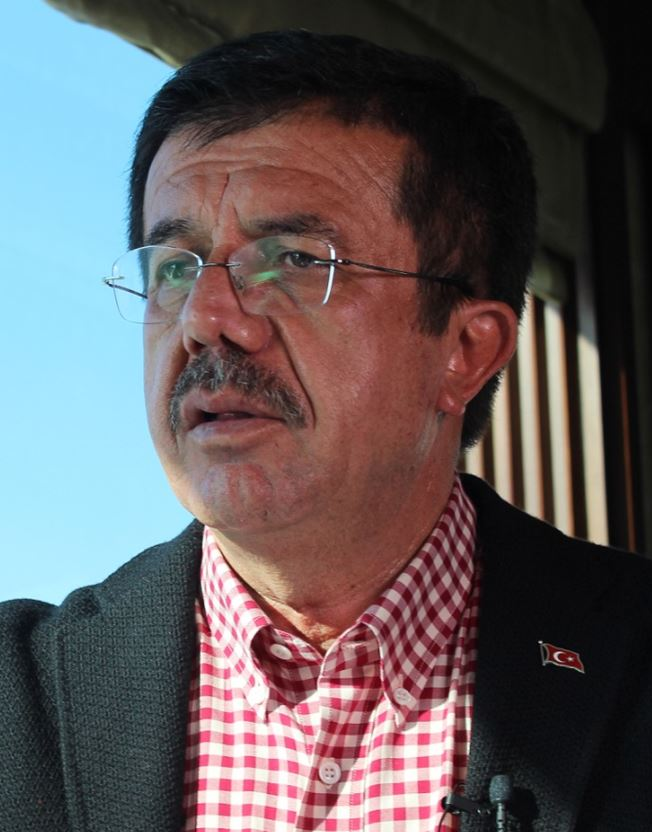
Candidate	Tunç Soyer	Nihat Zeybekci
Party	CHP	AK Party
Alliance	Nation	People
Popular vote	1,549,032	1,031,134
Percentage	58.08%	38.66%
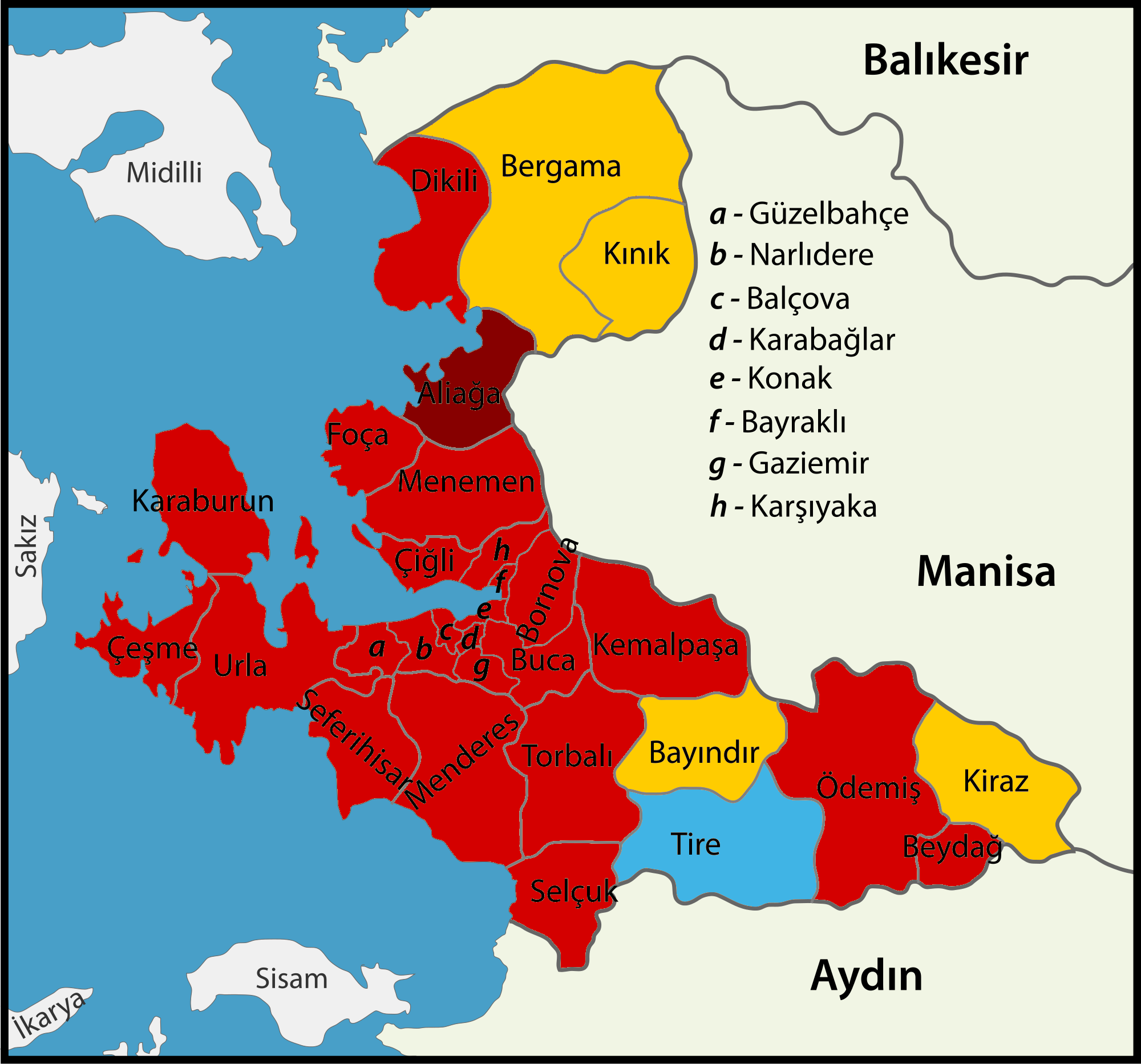
- 2019 İzmir Local Election results by district.
Mayor before election
Aziz Kocaoğlu
CHP
Elected Mayor
Tunç Soyer
CHP

Mayoral elections were held in the Turkish province of İzmir as part of nationwide local elections on 31 March 2019. A total of 31 mayors, one for each of the 30 districts of İzmir and one for the İzmir Metropolitan Municipality, were elected.

Republican People's Party (CHP) candidate Tunç Soyer, the former Mayor of Seferihisar, was elected as Mayor of the İzmir Metropolitan Municipality, beating Justice and Development Party (AK Party) candidate Nihat Zeybekci by 58.1% to 38.7%. Zeybekci conceded defeat soon after Soyer built an unassailable lead.

== Candidates ==
On 27 November 2018, the ruling Justice and Development Party (AK Party) announced their metropolitan mayoral candidate to be Nihat Zeybekci, the former mayor of Denizli and former Minister of the Economy. Due to the People's Alliance agreement, Zeybekci had the support of the Nationalist Movement Party (MHP).

With incumbent mayor Aziz Kocaoğlu announcing his intention to step down, the main opposition Republican People's Party (CHP) began considering new nominees. Tunç Soyer, the serving Mayor of Seferihisar, was seen as the frontrunner and was selected on 27 January 2019 despite Kocaoğlu re-entering the race shortly before the announcement. Soyer had the support of the İYİ Party and ran as the joint candidate of the Nation Alliance.

== Results ==
Electorate		Ballot boxes		
3.253.745		10.161		
Candidates			Results	
Abbr.	Party	Candidate	Votes	%
CHP	Republican People's Party	Mustafa Tunç Soyer	1.549.693	58.10
AK Party	Justice and Development Party	Nihat Zeybekci	1.032.020	38.69
SP	Felicity Party	Şerafettin Kılıç	30.179	1.13
DSP	Democratic Left Party	Selçuk Karakülçe	20.528	0.77
DP	Democratic Party	Tarcan Ülük	11.369	0.43
VATAN	Patriotic Party	Rifat Mutlu	8.535	0.32
CPT	Communist Party of Turkey	Senem Doruk İnam	8.061	0.30
BTP	Independent Turkey Party	Mehmet Dinç	3.958	0.15
IND	Independent	İbrahim Demir	2.871	0.03
IND	Independent	Deniz Tütmez	2.871	0.03
IND	Independent	Yalçın Yanık	2.871	0.02
IND	Independent	Ali İhsan Erdenilgem	2.871	0.01
Total			2.740.742	
Invalid / blank			73.528	
Turnout			84.23	
