= 2014 İzmir mayoral election =

2014 İzmir mayoral elections
← 2009	30 March 2014	2019 →
- Turnout: 90.38%
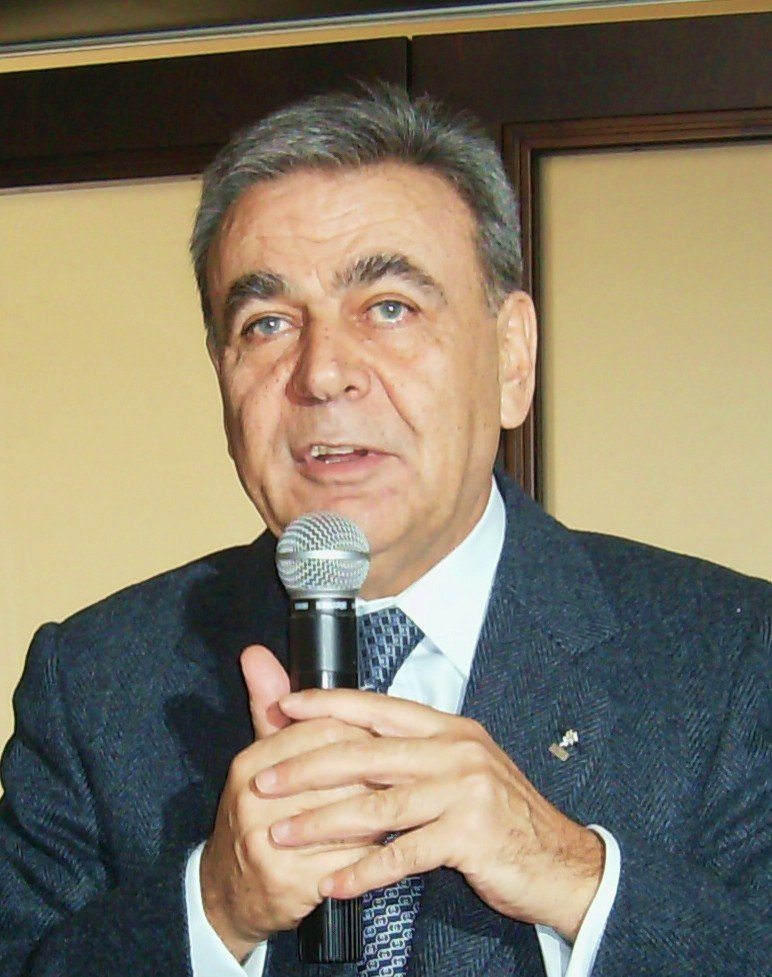

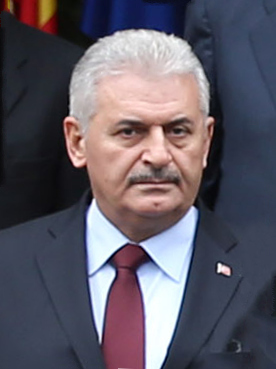
Candidate	Aziz Kocaoğlu	Binali Yıldırım
Party	CHP	AK Party
Popular vote	1,307,501	947,108
Percentage	49.60%	35.93%
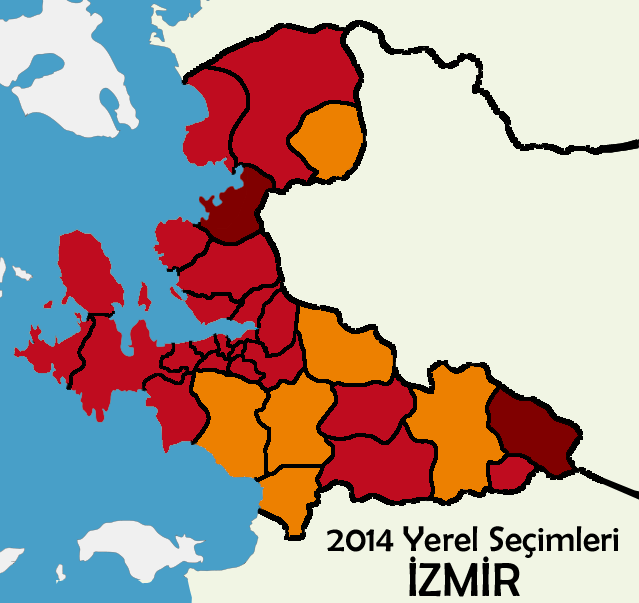
Mayor before election
Aziz Kocaoğlu
CHP
Elected Mayor
Aziz Kocaoğlu
CHP

The İzmir mayoral elections of 2014 were held on 30 March 2014 as part of the nationwide local elections held on the same day. Mayors for the metropolitan municipality of İzmir and 30 other district municipalities throughout the İzmir Province were elected during the election, as well as municipal councillors for each district. The incumbent Aziz Kocaoğlu from the Republican People's Party (CHP) was re-elected as the metropolitan mayor of İzmir with 49.6% of the vote.

The governing Justice and Development Party (AK Party) embarked on a particularly strong campaign, since İzmir was widely seen as the most significant stronghold of the opposition throughout the country. An AK Party gain in İzmir would thus be significant due to the impact it would have on the opposition. Although the AK Party was unable to win the metropolitan municipality, they won numerous other municipalities mostly in the south of the province, capitalising on their policy of extending the İZBAN commuter rail service to them. The Nationalist Movement Party also took two municipalities despite controlling none previously. Overall, the CHP won 23 of the 31 mayoral positions up for election, the AK Party won 6 and the MHP won 2.

Large-scale electoral fraud was reported during the counting process in İzmir, with the province being one of several provinces suffering from controversial electricity cuts on the eve of polling day.

== İzmir Metropolitan Municipality ==
Electorate		Ballot boxes		
3.030.462		10.296		
Candidates			Results	
Abbr.	Party	Candidate	Votes	%
CHP	Republican People's Party	Aziz Kocaoğlu	1.307.501	49.6
AK Party	Justice and Development Party	Binali Yıldırım	947.108	35.9
MHP	Nationalist Movement Party	Murat Taşer	210.124	7.97
HDP	Peoples' Democratic Party	Osman Özçelik	88.375	3.35
DSP	Democratic Left Party	Selçuk Karakülçe	13.975	0.53
SP	Felicity Party	Mehmet Ali Özüdoğru	13.809	0.52
BBP	Great Union Party	Vural Turan	12.717	0.48
İP	Workers' Party	Hüseyin Tugay Şen	10.751	0.40
HEPAR	Rights and Equality Party	Barış Çınar	6.329	0.24
DP	Democratic Party	Osman Varol	4.557	0.17
YP	Homeland Party	Reşat Karaoğlu	3.204	0.12
BTP	Independent Turkey Party	Mustafa Aslan	2.924	0.11
HKP	People's Liberation Party	Suat Şahin	2.405	0.09
DYP	True Path Party	Secaattin Zenginoğlu	2.246	0.08
CPT	Communist Party of Turkey	Savaş Sarı	2.245	0.08
TURK-P	Social Reconciliation Reform and Development Party	Murat Durak	2.160	0.08
HAK-PAR	Rights and Freedoms Party	Ali Reşat Öztürk	2.139	0.08
MP	Nation Party	Nejat Cebeci	940	0.03
	Independent	Menderes Gencer	914	0.03
	Independent	Burcu Koçlu	897	0.03
LDP	Liberal Democrat Party	Orkun Köksoy	548	0.02
Total			2.635.868	
Invalid / blank			102.997	
Turnout			90.38	
source: YSK

== Districts ==
=== Aliağa ===

Electorate		Ballot boxes		
56,566		198		
Candidates			Results	
Abbr.	Party	Candidate	Votes	%
MHP	Nationalist Movement Party	Serkan Acar	15.800	32.1
AK Party	Justice and Development Party	İbrahim Etem Yorulmaz	14.928	30.3
CHP	Republican People's Party	Barış Eroğlu	9.999	20.3
DSP	Democratic Left Party	Hakkı Ülkü	6.046	12.3
HDP	Peoples' Democratic Party	Bircan Karakaya	1.602	3.26
SP	Felicity Party	Fatih Zeybekoğlu	356	0.72
DP	Democratic Party	Bayram Karcı	165	0.33
BBP	Great Union Party	Emre Kama	96	0.19
İP	Workers' Party	Sami Yaşar	64	0.13
BTP	Independent Turkey Party	Mustafa Canöz	43	0.08
LDP	Liberal Democrat Party	Ayhan Dost	12	0.02
Total			49.111	
Invalid / blank			2.227	
Turnout			91.74	
source: YSK

=== Balçova ===

Electorate		Ballot boxes		
60,211		202		
Candidates			Results	
Abbr.	Party	Candidate	Votes	%
CHP	Republican People's Party	Mehmet Ali Çalkaya	31.654	60.6
AK Party	Justice and Development Party	Hasan Özcan	11.800	22.5
MHP	Nationalist Movement Party	Murat Sevengül	3.310	6.33
DSP	Democratic Left Party	Semra Aksakal Kayacan	3.158	6.04
HDP	Peoples' Democratic Party	Ercan Aygün	1.288	2.46
İP	Workers' Party	Talat Özdemir	270	0.51
BBP	Great Union Party	İsmail Mergen	199	0.38
HEPAR	Rights and Equality Party	Ayşen Talay	174	0.33
SP	Felicity Party	Bülent Arslan	151	0.28
DP	Democratic Party	Hakan Gürsu	148	0.28
BTP	Independent Turkey Party	Rahime Sakınmaz	42	0.08
MP	Nation Party	Vedat Üyüklüer	18	0.03
	Independent	Hasan Aydın	15	0.02
LDP	Liberal Democrat Party	Esergül Öztürk Hepşennur	7	0.01
Total			52.234	
Invalid / blank			1.883	
Turnout			89.88	
source: YSK

=== Bayındır ===

Electorate		Ballot boxes		
31,206		130		
Candidates			Results	
Abbr.	Party	Candidate	Votes	%
CHP	Republican People's Party	Ufuk Sesli	9.845	35.6
AK Party	Justice and Development Party	Mehmet Kertiş	9.725	35.2
MHP	Nationalist Movement Party	Mümtaz Almışlar	6.611	23.9
HDP	Peoples' Democratic Party	Fikret Kaya	1.000	3.62
SP	Felicity Party	Ayhan Bilgi	131	0.47
DP	Democratic Party	Fahri Avran	107	0.38
İP	Workers' Party	Cevdet Taşçı	83	0.30
BTP	Independent Turkey Party	Yasin Kahriman	38	0.13
BBP	Great Union Party	Afşin Türker Aydın	34	0.12
MP	Nation Party	İbrahim Yılmaz	24	0.08
Total			27.598	
Invalid / blank			1.538	
Turnout			93.37	
source: YSK

=== Bayraklı ===

Electorate		Ballot boxes		
231,625		743		
Candidates			Results	
Abbr.	Party	Candidate	Votes	%
CHP	Republican People's Party	Hasan Karabağ	88.745	44.0
AK Party	Justice and Development Party	İsmail Sarı	76.136	37.8
MHP	Nationalist Movement Party	Mehmet Toptaş	16.847	8.36
HDP	Peoples' Democratic Party	Ayten Marangoz	8.839	4.39
DSP	Democratic Left Party	Hüseyin Aslan	5.825	2.89
BBP	Great Union Party	Ali Dağaşan	1.368	0.67
SP	Felicity Party	Vedat Kolukısa	1.360	0.67
İP	Workers' Party	Faruk Yanık	696	0.34
DP	Democratic Party	Mehmet Emin Erener	687	0.34
HEPAR	Rights and Equality Party	Aynur Baylı	387	0.19
BTP	Independent Turkey Party	Ömer Kalem	211	0.10
MP	Nation Party	Yakup Harmankaya	87	0.04
LDP	Liberal Democrat Party	Mehmet Emin Özer	61	0.03
	Independent	Salih Ünver	51	0.02
	Independent	Atilla Ayar	41	0.02
Total			201.341	
Invalid / blank			8.500	
Turnout			90.60	
source: YSK

=== Bergama ===

Electorate		Ballot boxes		
78,540		322		
Candidates			Results	
Abbr.	Party	Candidate	Votes	%
CHP	Republican People's Party	Mehmet Gönenç	23.722	34.5
AK Party	Justice and Development Party	Hasan Şahin	21.494	31.2
MHP	Nationalist Movement Party	Özkan Karadiken	21.206	30.8
HDP	Peoples' Democratic Party	Gani Oğuz	579	0.84
SP	Felicity Party	Cengiz Utkulu	496	0.72
DP	Democratic Party	Hüseyin Yalçın	452	0.65
HEPAR	Rights and Equality Party	Mehmet Altınöz	168	0.24
İP	Workers' Party	Mehmet Kırman	159	0.23
BTP	Independent Turkey Party	Mehmet Kocagöncü	148	0.21
BBP	Great Union Party	Veysel Korkmaz	120	0.17
	Independent	Ahsen Balta	103	0.14
LDP	Liberal Democrat Party	Halil İbrahim Geyik	42	0.06
Total			68.689	
Invalid / blank			4.076	
Turnout			92.74	
source: YSK

=== Beydağ ===

Electorate		Ballot boxes		
9,957		46		
Candidates			Results	
Abbr.	Party	Candidate	Votes	%
CHP	Republican People's Party	Süleyman Vasfi Şentürk	4.714	53.8
AK Party	Justice and Development Party	Feyzi Kaya	2.315	26.4
MHP	Nationalist Movement Party	Alaeddin Topçu	1.499	17.1
İP	Workers' Party	Nihat Yenisoy	57	0.65
SP	Felicity Party	İsmet Uysal	45	0.51
DSP	Democratic Left Party	Ümit Çakır	41	0.46
BTP	Independent Turkey Party	Yunus Şimşek	26	0.29
BBP	Great Union Party	Ali Aydın	19	0.21
MP	Nation Party	Sedat Kasap	18	0.20
HDP	Peoples' Democratic Party	Nizamettin Demirel	17	0.19
Total			8.751	
Invalid / blank			719	
Turnout			95.11	
source: YSK

=== Bornova ===

Electorate		Ballot boxes		
310,535		1023		
Candidates			Results	
Abbr.	Party	Candidate	Votes	%
CHP	Republican People's Party	Olgun Atila	134.092	49.5
AK Party	Justice and Development Party	İlhan Kaya	92.281	34.1
MHP	Nationalist Movement Party	Erol Bahtiyar	27.987	10.3
HDP	Peoples' Democratic Party	Orhan Ayhan	7.667	2.83
SP	Felicity Party	Osman Akyollu	2.221	0.82
BBP	Great Union Party	İbrahim Uzun	1.317	0.48
DP	Democratic Party	Abdullah Tekbaş	1.287	0.47
HEPAR	Rights and Equality Party	Salih Biçerer	1.027	0.37
İP	Workers' Party	Erdoğan Özer	889	0.32
DSP	Democratic Left Party	Kemal Cem Pülten	878	0.32
BTP	Independent Turkey Party	Orçun Baysal	394	0.14
	Independent	Ümit Arslan	246	0.09
MP	Nation Party	Ömer Faruk Tekin	128	0.04
LDP	Liberal Democrat Party	Gökhan Vatansever	101	0.03
Total			270.515	
Invalid / blank			11.858	
Turnout			90.93	
source: YSK

=== Buca ===

Electorate		Ballot boxes		
331,900		1068		
Candidates			Results	
Abbr.	Party	Candidate	Votes	%
CHP	Republican People's Party	Levent Piriştina	122.640	43.1
AK Party	Justice and Development Party	Cemil Şeboy	106.816	37.5
MHP	Nationalist Movement Party	Levent Cizmeli	34.374	12.0
HDP	Peoples' Democratic Party	Adnan Kaya	11.698	4.11
DSP	Democratic Left Party	Öner Osmanoğulları	2.014	0.70
BBP	Great Union Party	Cavit Babur	1.691	0.59
SP	Felicity Party	Cemal Arıkan	1.619	0.56
İP	Workers' Party	Ramazan Çalışkan	1.005	0.35
HEPAR	Rights and Equality Party	Rahmi Bilgili	867	0.30
DP	Democratic Party	Hasan Enet	828	0.29
BTP	Independent Turkey Party	Hülya Özyer	413	0.14
	Independent	İsmail Hakkı Küçük	184	0.06
LDP	Liberal Democrat Party	Mustafa Kemal Soydan	86	0.03
MP	Nation Party	Nalan Savaş	83	0.02
Total			284.318	
Invalid / blank			9.837	
Turnout			88.87	
source: YSK

=== Çeşme ===

Electorate		Ballot boxes		
27,549		101		
Candidates			Results	
Abbr.	Party	Candidate	Votes	%
CHP	Republican People's Party	Muhittin Dalgıç	13.267	56.8
AK Party	Justice and Development Party	Mustafa Cenger	8.505	36.4
MHP	Nationalist Movement Party	Önder Nas	802	3.43
HDP	Peoples' Democratic Party	Özlem Ayşe Önal	478	2.04
İP	Workers' Party	Songül Eren	75	0.32
DP	Democratic Party	Pınar Foral	62	0.26
HEPAR	Rights and Equality Party	Cihat Vatan	41	0.17
BBP	Great Union Party	Mehmet Kürşad Yükselcan	33	0.14
BTP	Independent Turkey Party	Mehmet Çiray	24	0.10
	Independent	Mehmet Yüce	22	0.09
SP	Felicity Party	İbrahim Orakçı	14	0.06
Total			23.323	
Invalid / blank			939	
Turnout			88.07	
source: YSK

=== Çiğli ===

Electorate		Ballot boxes		
131,877		429		
Candidates			Results	
Abbr.	Party	Candidate	Votes	%
CHP	Republican People's Party	Hasan Arslan	60.254	52.3
AK Party	Justice and Development Party	Adnan Yılmaz	35.572	30.9
MHP	Nationalist Movement Party	Mehmet Yalçın Bırazeroğlu	13.053	11.3
HDP	Peoples' Democratic Party	Yalçın Karaaslan	2.693	2.34
DSP	Democratic Left Party	Abubekir Sıddık Soysal	664	0.57
SP	Felicity Party	Muhsin Gircude	557	0.48
İP	Workers' Party	Hüsnü Ekim	555	0.48
BBP	Great Union Party	Kenan Çınar	516	0.44
HEPAR	Rights and Equality Party	Nafiz Saraçlar	423	0.36
DP	Democratic Party	İlker Taşkın	309	0.26
	Independent	Taner Cömert	240	0.20
BTP	Independent Turkey Party	Yunus Kılıç	134	0.11
MP	Nation Party	Ayşe Durmaz	42	0.03
LDP	Liberal Democrat Party	Yunus Emre Özgün	30	0.02
Total			115.042	
Invalid / blank			4.315	
Turnout			90.51	
source: YSK

=== Dikili ===

Electorate		Ballot boxes		
28,874		105		
Candidates			Results	
Abbr.	Party	Candidate	Votes	%
CHP	Republican People's Party	Mustafa Tosun	12.661	51.6
AK Party	Justice and Development Party	Ahmet Dağdelen	5.875	23.9
MHP	Nationalist Movement Party	Halis Devecioğlu	4.064	16.5
DSP	Democratic Left Party	Yusuf Altıparmak	965	3.93
HDP	Peoples' Democratic Party	Semra Uzunok	684	2.78
İP	Workers' Party	Mehmet Arıcı	124	0.50
SP	Felicity Party	Yusuf Çetin	108	0.44
BBP	Great Union Party	Hacı İbrahim Kireşci	47	0.19
Total			24.528	
Invalid / blank			1.266	
Turnout			89.33	
source: YSK

=== Foça ===

Electorate		Ballot boxes		
18,411		69		
Candidates			Results	
Abbr.	Party	Candidate	Votes	%
CHP	Republican People's Party	Gökhan Demirağ	6.714	42.0
MHP	Nationalist Movement Party	Serdar Mersin	4.272	26.7
DSP	Democratic Left Party	Osman Mert	1.918	12.0
AK Party	Justice and Development Party	Salih Emrullah Keleş	1.642	10.2
İP	Workers' Party	Yavuz Efe	808	5.05
HDP	Peoples' Democratic Party	Sibel Kalaycı	243	1.52
DP	Democratic Party	Haluk Bozkurt	169	1.05
BBP	Great Union Party	Fahretdin Saç	140	0.87
SP	Felicity Party	Muhammed Ali İbiş	50	0.31
BTP	Independent Turkey Party	Cemil Erdoğan	14	0.08
Total			15.970	
Invalid / blank			692	
Turnout			90.63	
source: YSK

=== Gaziemir ===

Electorate		Ballot boxes		
92,778		303		
Candidates			Results	
Abbr.	Party	Candidate	Votes	%
CHP	Republican People's Party	Halil İbrahim Şenol	38.625	47.5
AK Party	Justice and Development Party	Kerem Fahri Baykalmış	27.761	34.1
MHP	Nationalist Movement Party	Köksal Koç	9.333	11.4
HDP	Peoples' Democratic Party	Zühal Çelebi	3.591	4.41
BBP	Great Union Party	Mustafa Çakmak	428	0.52
SP	Felicity Party	Cihad Yavuz	388	0.47
İP	Workers' Party	Nurittin Çamlıca	307	0.37
HEPAR	Rights and Equality Party	Erhan Karasu	237	0.29
DP	Democratic Party	Ahmet Ufuk Şengel	190	0.23
DSP	Democratic Left Party	Mümtaz Şamil Önal	188	0.23
	Independent	Oğuz Çetin	114	0.14
BTP	Independent Turkey Party	Zübeyde Uslu	98	0.12
MP	Nation Party	Nasih Murat Üyüklüer	25	0.03
LDP	Liberal Democrat Party	Şevki Bakırbaş	24	0.03
Total			81.309	
Invalid / blank			3.657	
Turnout			91.58	
source: YSK

=== Güzelbahçe ===

Electorate		Ballot boxes		
19,943		68		
Candidates			Results	
Abbr.	Party	Candidate	Votes	%
CHP	Republican People's Party	Özdem Mustafa İnce	8.880	51.9
DSP	Democratic Left Party	Ertan Avkıran	4.926	28.8
AK Party	Justice and Development Party	Cengiz Sandıklı	2.020	11.8
MHP	Nationalist Movement Party	Hasan Berrak	589	3.44
İP	Workers' Party	Gülgün Budak	238	1.39
HDP	Peoples' Democratic Party	Fikriye Birsen	170	0.99
DP	Democratic Party	Gürcan Ötegengil	102	0.59
BBP	Great Union Party	Hakan Kara	76	0.44
SP	Felicity Party	Rüstem Tunç	42	0.24
HEPAR	Rights and Equality Party	Hasan Cenk Çankaya	33	0.19
BTP	Independent Turkey Party	Tufan Tok	15	0.08
	Independent	Levent Kaya	7	0.04
LDP	Liberal Democrat Party	Selçuk Serdar	2	0.01
Total			17.100	
Invalid / blank			665	
Turnout			89.08	
source: YSK

=== Karabağlar ===

Electorate		Ballot boxes		
350,945		1136		
Candidates			Results	
Abbr.	Party	Candidate	Votes	%
CHP	Republican People's Party	Muhittin Selvitopu	129.522	42.8
AK Party	Justice and Development Party	Necip Kalkan	117.853	38.9
MHP	Nationalist Movement Party	Cihan Demir	31.125	10.2
HDP	Peoples' Democratic Party	Mahmut Önen	14.365	4.75
BBP	Great Union Party	Cebrail Tümer	2.836	0.93
SP	Felicity Party	Mümin Baştürk	2.426	0.80
İP	Workers' Party	Ahmet Refik Zerek	1.241	0.41
DP	Democratic Party	Mahmut Dağ	1.079	0.35
HEPAR	Rights and Equality Party	Baki Baklan	948	0.31
BTP	Independent Turkey Party	Baykal Bozdemir	479	0.15
DYP	True Path Party	Uğur Er	179	0.05
MP	Nation Party	Rayhan Keleş	120	0.03
LDP	Liberal Democrat Party	Metin Ferit Türkeli	112	0.03
	Independent	Bülent Öztürk	70	0.02
	Independent	İsmail Nalbantoğlu	43	0.01
	Independent	Necati Işık	11	0.00
Total			302.409	
Invalid / blank			11.761	
Turnout			89.52	
source: YSK

=== Karaburun ===

Electorate		Ballot boxes		
7,558		35		
Candidates			Results	
Abbr.	Party	Candidate	Votes	%
CHP	Republican People's Party	Ahmet Çakır	3.274	50.9
AK Party	Justice and Development Party	Hüseyin Onur Altın	2.335	36.3
MHP	Nationalist Movement Party	Ogün Dönmez	583	9.06
HDP	Peoples' Democratic Party	Ekrem Kaya	134	2.08
İP	Workers' Party	Sıdıka Müjde Mazzone	45	0.70
DP	Democratic Party	Ferhan Gök	25	0.38
SP	Felicity Party	Şah İsmail Soylo	24	0.37
BBP	Great Union Party	Murat Toprak	8	0.12
Total			6.428	
Invalid / blank			287	
Turnout			88.85	
source: YSK

=== Karşıyaka ===

Electorate		Ballot boxes		
259,082		841		
Candidates			Results	
Abbr.	Party	Candidate	Votes	%
CHP	Republican People's Party	Hüseyin Mutlu Akpınar	160.532	70.7
AK Party	Justice and Development Party	Tanfer Kemerli	41.280	18.1
MHP	Nationalist Movement Party	Lütfi Kılıç	14.747	6.49
HDP	Peoples' Democratic Party	Şule Ayhan	4.090	1.80
İP	Workers' Party	İrfan Erol	2.222	0.97
HEPAR	Rights and Equality Party	Rıza Polat Oktay	1.315	0.57
BBP	Great Union Party	Mehmet Hopa	746	0.32
SP	Felicity Party	Ahmet Tekin	518	0.22
DSP	Democratic Left Party	Muzaffer Dönmez	482	0.21
DP	Democratic Party	Halil Zeki Osma	445	0.19
	Independent	Volkan Berber	229	0.10
BTP	Independent Turkey Party	Hakan Özüçelenk	175	0.07
	Independent	Serkan İşgen	71	0.03
LDP	Liberal Democrat Party	Eyüp Sevim	56	0.02
MP	Nation Party	Ergün Boyacıoğlu	50	0.02
Total			226.958	
Invalid / blank			5.427	
Turnout			89.70	
source: YSK

=== Kemalpaşa ===

Electorate		Ballot boxes		
70,421		249		
Candidates			Results	
Abbr.	Party	Candidate	Votes	%
AK Party	Justice and Development Party	Arif Uğurlu	25.416	40.6
CHP	Republican People's Party	Rıdvan Karakayalı	22.081	35.3
MHP	Nationalist Movement Party	Metin Yaşar	12.193	19.4
SP	Felicity Party	Arif Gemici	1.234	1.97
HDP	Peoples' Democratic Party	Sakine Sarısaltık	840	1.34
DP	Democratic Party	Adem Damlıgül	253	0.40
BBP	Great Union Party	İlhan Küçükdağ	205	0.32
İP	Workers' Party	Mustafa Özdemir	140	0.22
BTP	Independent Turkey Party	Mustafa Bakır	92	0.14
DSP	Democratic Left Party	Halil İbrahim Değirmenci	43	0.06
LDP	Liberal Democrat Party	Cihat Gümüş	32	0.05
Total			62.529	
Invalid / blank			2.754	
Turnout			92.72	
source: YSK

=== Kınık ===

Electorate		Ballot boxes		
20,355		86		
Candidates			Results	
Abbr.	Party	Candidate	Votes	%
AK Party	Justice and Development Party	Sadık Doğruer	7.433	40.6
CHP	Republican People's Party	Mehmet Çetinkaya	6.046	33.0
DP	Democratic Party	Süleyman Kaya	2.926	15.9
MHP	Nationalist Movement Party	Rıza Dönmez	1.427	7.80
HDP	Peoples' Democratic Party	Memduh Karaduman	251	1.37
SP	Felicity Party	Mustafa Kulaklı	139	0.75
BBP	Great Union Party	Miraç Cerah	39	0.21
BTP	Independent Turkey Party	Adnan Terzioğlu	29	0.15
Total			18.290	
Invalid / blank			1.056	
Turnout			95.05	
source: YSK

=== Kiraz ===

Electorate		Ballot boxes		
32,972		133		
Candidates			Results	
Abbr.	Party	Candidate	Votes	%
MHP	Nationalist Movement Party	Saliha Şengül	12.285	42.4
AK Party	Justice and Development Party	Erol Çomak	8.468	29.2
CHP	Republican People's Party	Ercan Ekici	7.372	25.4
SP	Felicity Party	Mesut Sertkaya	221	0.76
DP	Democratic Party	Mehmet Emin Akkaya	189	0.65
İP	Workers' Party	Ömer Sünter	118	0.40
BTP	Independent Turkey Party	Cemali Şimşek	89	0.30
BBP	Great Union Party	Ebubekir Şahin	62	0.21
HDP	Peoples' Democratic Party	Fırat Pülat	61	0.21
MP	Nation Party	Nuri Kaya	55	0.19
Total			28.920	
Invalid / blank			2.492	
Turnout			95.27	
source: YSK

=== Konak ===

Electorate		Ballot boxes		
294,503		994		
Candidates			Results	
Abbr.	Party	Candidate	Votes	%
CHP	Republican People's Party	Sema Pekdaş	115.640	46.9
AK Party	Justice and Development Party	İlknur Denizli	76.276	30.9
DSP	Democratic Left Party	Hakan Tartan	19.429	7.88
HDP	Peoples' Democratic Party	Yıldız Çelik	14.724	5.97
MHP	Nationalist Movement Party	Adil Özyiğit	14.001	5.67
SP	Felicity Party	Mustafa Erduran	1.574	0.63
İP	Workers' Party	Bülent Karagöz	1.355	0.54
BBP	Great Union Party	Hüseyin Özkan	942	0.38
DP	Democratic Party	Atila Yaman	863	0.35
HEPAR	Rights and Equality Party	Barış Ürkmeyen	731	0.29
BTP	Independent Turkey Party	Adem Birinci	436	0.17
	Independent	Mehmet Şener Özterzi	210	0.08
MP	Nation Party	Şenay Cebeci	147	0.05
LDP	Liberal Democrat Party	Mustafa Mermerci	109	0.04
	Independent	Özgür Ufuk Badem	94	0.03
Total			246.531	
Invalid / blank			10.602	
Turnout			87.31	
source: YSK

=== Menderes ===

Electorate		Ballot boxes		
58,349		209		
Candidates			Results	
Abbr.	Party	Candidate	Votes	%
AK Party	Justice and Development Party	Bülent Soylu	20.652	40.4
CHP	Republican People's Party	Ahmet Pala	20.303	39.7
	Independent	Ergun Özgün	4.361	8.53
MHP	Nationalist Movement Party	Cenk Cem Şahin	3.034	5.93
HDP	Peoples' Democratic Party	Halime Akdağ	1.078	2.11
DSP	Democratic Left Party	Arif Ekti	485	0.94
BTP	Independent Turkey Party	İsmet Ekren	391	0.76
SP	Felicity Party	Mehmet Alpat	376	0.73
BBP	Great Union Party	Fikret Çakmak	130	0.25
HEPAR	Rights and Equality Party	Oğuz Gül	130	0.25
İP	Workers' Party	Raif Tankut Ünal	122	0.23
LDP	Liberal Democrat Party	Nurcan Soydan	26	0.05
Total			51.088	
Invalid / blank			2.655	
Turnout			92.11	
source: YSK

=== Menemen ===

Electorate		Ballot boxes		
100,829		350		
Candidates			Results	
Abbr.	Party	Candidate	Votes	%
CHP	Republican People's Party	Tahir Şahin	38.080	43.5
AK Party	Justice and Development Party	Mehmet Bilal Kaplangı	28.142	32.2
MHP	Nationalist Movement Party	Ahmet İncesu	12.996	14.8
HDP	Peoples' Democratic Party	Mustafa Aydın	6.320	7.23
SP	Felicity Party	Orhan Yıldırım	437	0.50
İP	Workers' Party	Ali Sakallı	268	0.30
BBP	Great Union Party	Mükerrem Uysal	267	0.30
DP	Democratic Party	Murat Eröz	248	0.28
DSP	Democratic Left Party	Mustafa Seviş	229	0.26
BTP	Independent Turkey Party	Nail Dinler	203	0.23
	Independent	Soner Bereketli	153	0.17
LDP	Liberal Democrat Party	Celal Görmüş	27	0.03
Total			87.370	
Invalid / blank			3.998	
Turnout			90.62	
source: YSK

=== Narlıdere ===

Electorate		Ballot boxes		
48,437		159		
Candidates			Results	
Abbr.	Party	Candidate	Votes	%
CHP	Republican People's Party	Abdül Batur	25.405	61.3
AK Party	Justice and Development Party	Erkan Fatih Dereli	7.091	17.1
	Independent	Gülseren Sönmez	2.930	7.07
MHP	Nationalist Movement Party	Umut Göl	2.518	6.07
HDP	Peoples' Democratic Party	Ertuğrul Barka	1.986	4.79
İP	Workers' Party	Bektaş Özkolaçık	552	1.33
BTP	Independent Turkey Party	Mustafa Küçükakyüz	484	1.16
HEPAR	Rights and Equality Party	Levent Mortan	141	0.34
BBP	Great Union Party	Ali Emre Sapmaz	139	0.33
SP	Felicity Party	Halil Yalçınkaya	81	0.19
DP	Democratic Party	Abdurrahman Bahadır Bardakcı	79	0.19
LDP	Liberal Democrat Party	Hüsnü Öber	15	0.03
MP	Nation Party	Mehmet Ekiz	12	0.02
Total			41.433	
Invalid / blank			1.923	
Turnout			89.51	
source: YSK

=== Ödemiş ===

Electorate		Ballot boxes		
100,656		382		
Candidates			Results	
Abbr.	Party	Candidate	Votes	%
AK Party	Justice and Development Party	Abdurrahman Mahmut Badem	34.462	39.1
CHP	Republican People's Party	Bekir Keskin	33.077	37.5
MHP	Nationalist Movement Party	Mehmet Yılmazer	17.872	20.3
DP	Democratic Party	Mehmet Özkan	936	1.06
SP	Felicity Party	Mehmet Zungur	587	0.66
HDP	Peoples' Democratic Party	Rıstem Temel	438	0.49
İP	Workers' Party	Güven Karabelli	190	0.21
BBP	Great Union Party	Yalçın Duman	170	0.19
MP	Nation Party	Rafet Kaya	166	0.18
BTP	Independent Turkey Party	İsmail Çevik	114	0.12
Total			88.012	
Invalid / blank			4.455	
Turnout			91.94	
source: YSK

=== Seferihisar ===

Electorate		Ballot boxes		
24,708		90		
Candidates			Results	
Abbr.	Party	Candidate	Votes	%
CHP	Republican People's Party	Mustafa Tunç Soyer	11.232	52.2
AK Party	Justice and Development Party	Hamit Nişancı	8.444	39.2
MHP	Nationalist Movement Party	Hüseyin Nail Gökdeniz	1.142	5.31
HDP	Peoples' Democratic Party	Edibe Çiçek	404	1.87
İP	Workers' Party	Ümran Beken	87	0.40
SP	Felicity Party	Yakup Akcan	86	0.40
DP	Democratic Party	Volkan Özfırat	48	0.22
BBP	Great Union Party	Ali Koyugölge	37	0.17
BTP	Independent Turkey Party	Osman Azbay	14	0.06
LDP	Liberal Democrat Party	Meral Köksoy	4	0.01
Total			21.498	
Invalid / blank			845	
Turnout			90.43	
source: YSK

=== Selçuk ===

Electorate		Ballot boxes		
26,524		93		
Candidates			Results	
Abbr.	Party	Candidate	Votes	%
AK Party	Justice and Development Party	Dahi Zeynel Bakıcı	8.624	36.67
CHP	Republican People's Party	Hüseyin Vefa Ülgür	8.611	36.61
MHP	Nationalist Movement Party	Levent Görür	5.010	21.3
HDP	Peoples' Democratic Party	Tacettin Dolu	912	3.87
İP	Workers' Party	Seyfi Talyak	107	0.45
DSP	Democratic Left Party	Hüseyin Kireç	80	0.34
SP	Felicity Party	Mehmet Aslan	55	0.23
DP	Democratic Party	Elmas Vergi	43	0.18
BBP	Great Union Party	Erkan Budak	42	0.17
BTP	Independent Turkey Party	Sevinç Baysal	33	0.14
Total			23.517	
Invalid / blank			928	
Turnout			92.16	
source: YSK

=== Tire ===

Electorate		Ballot boxes		
61,978		236		
Candidates			Results	
Abbr.	Party	Candidate	Votes	%
CHP	Republican People's Party	Tayfur Çiçek	19.860	37.0
AK Party	Justice and Development Party	Mehmet Çeltikçioğlu	18.025	33.6
MHP	Nationalist Movement Party	Hasan Çağlı	11.194	20.8
SP	Felicity Party	Sedrettin Yakuter	2.625	4.89
HDP	Peoples' Democratic Party	Sebahat Kuş	794	1.48
DP	Democratic Party	Hasan Sinan Sarp	474	0.88
BBP	Great Union Party	Erkan Etçi	225	0.41
İP	Workers' Party	Ali Rıza Türköz	169	0.31
DSP	Democratic Left Party	Halis Cenk Dolu	81	0.15
BTP	Independent Turkey Party	Ali Durmaz	77	0.14
MP	Nation Party	Şükrü Kaya	62	0.11
Total			53.586	
Invalid / blank			3.211	
Turnout			91.65	
source: YSK

=== Torbalı ===

Electorate		Ballot boxes		
101,833		362		
Candidates			Results	
Abbr.	Party	Candidate	Votes	%
AK Party	Justice and Development Party	Adnan Yaşar Görmez	31.074	34.8
CHP	Republican People's Party	Ufuk Yörük	29.881	33.5
MHP	Nationalist Movement Party	Yurdadoğ Mutlu	14.198	15.9
DSP	Democratic Left Party	İbrahim Öz	6.374	7.15
HDP	Peoples' Democratic Party	Hüsnü Koyuncu	5.738	6.44
SP	Felicity Party	Ali Sabancı	606	0.68
DP	Democratic Party	Mahmut Kömürcü	396	0.44
BBP	Great Union Party	Feyzullah Turan	306	0.34
İP	Workers' Party	Muzaffer Yıldırımer	277	0.31
BTP	Independent Turkey Party	Serdar Karagüzel	128	0.14
	Independent	Şehmus Gümüştaş	54	0.06
LDP	Liberal Democrat Party	Savaş Temel	37	0.04
Total			89.069	
Invalid / blank			4.367	
Turnout			91.76	
source: YSK

=== Urla ===

Electorate		Ballot boxes		
43,061		154		
Candidates			Results	
Abbr.	Party	Candidate	Votes	%
CHP	Republican People's Party	Sibel Uyar	16.420	44.4
MHP	Nationalist Movement Party	Hasan Hüseyin Akgül	7.900	21.3
AK Party	Justice and Development Party	Erşan Eroğlu	6.216	16.8
DSP	Democratic Left Party	Mehmet Selçuk Karaosmanoğlu	4.954	13.4
HDP	Peoples' Democratic Party	Sibel Çakır	798	2.15
İP	Workers' Party	Hayrettin Akay	278	0.75
DP	Democratic Party	Özdemir Bür	143	0.38
SP	Felicity Party	Hamza Gönül	96	0.25
BBP	Great Union Party	Serkan Uyar	86	0.23
BTP	Independent Turkey Party	Mehmet Dinç	60	0.16
LDP	Liberal Democrat Party	Uğur Lama	7	0.01
Total			36.958	
Invalid / blank			1.584	
Turnout			89.54	
source: YSK
