= 2024 İzmir mayoral election =

Municipal election in Turkey

2024 İzmir mayoral elections
- 31 March 2024; Part of the 2024 Turkish local elections
- Metropolitan Municipality
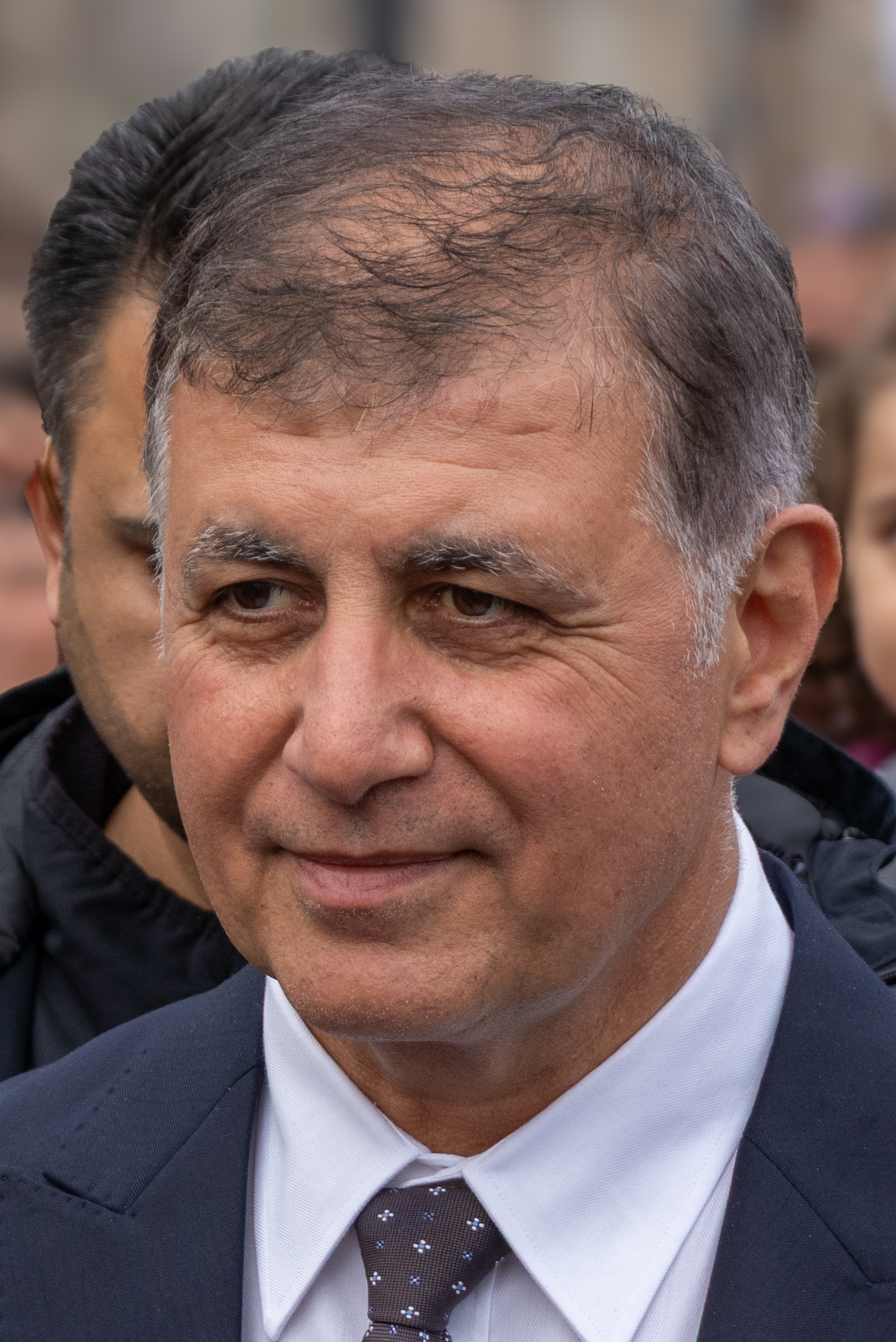

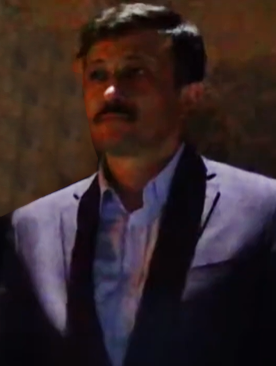
Candidate	Cemil Tugay	Hamza Dağ
Party	CHP	AK Party
Alliance	N/A	People's Alliance
Popular vote	1,292,118	977,895
Percentage	48.97%	37.06%
- District Municipalities
- All 30 municipal districts of İzmir
Party	Seats	+/–
CHP	28	+4
AK Party	1	−3
MHP	1	0
This lists parties that won seats. See the complete results below.
Mayor before	Mayor after
Tunç Soyer; CHP	Cemil Tugay; CHP

Local elections took place in İzmir, the third largest city of Turkey, on 31 March 2024, as part of nationwide local elections. A metropolitan municipal mayor was elected alongside mayors and councillors for the districts of İzmir.

The governing People's Alliance, formed of the Justice and Development Party (AK Party) and the Nationalist Movement Party (MHP), fielded AK Party Member of Parliament Hamza Dağ as their candidate. Incumbent Mayor Tunç Soyer, from the opposition Republican People's Party (CHP), was not nominated to stand for re-election. Soyer claimed that the decision was politically motivated as he had backed Kemal Kılıçdaroğlu for CHP party leader instead of the eventual winner Özgür Özel during the party's leadership convention in November 2023. The CHP, which was not part of any electoral alliance, instead nominated Cemil Tugay, the District Mayor of Karşıyaka, one of İzmir's most populous and central districts.

The result was a landslide victory for the Republican People's Party (CHP), for which İzmir has traditionally been seen as a stronghold. Tugay was elected with 49% of the vote compared to Dağ's 37%. Throughout İzmir's districts, the CHP won all but two mayoralties, with the AK Party and MHP each winning one.

== Opinion polls ==
Date	Pollster	Sample	CHP	AK PARTY	İYİ	DEM	ZP	Others	Undecided	Lead
29–30 Mar	BETİMAR	3.722	40,9	40,6	6,6	5,3	3,0	3,6	—	0,3
27–28 Mar	Özdemir	2.409	43,4	41,9	4,4	3,6	3,1	3,5	—	1,5
25–28 Mar	ORC	3.220	44,9	36,2	10,6	3,8	—	4,5	—	8,7
23–26 Mar	AREA	3.066	42,4	38,7	8	6,5	2,5	1,9	—	3,7
12–26 Mar	Avrasya	?	50,4	32,1	—	—	—	17,5	—	18,3
21–25 Mar	Areda Survey	2.473	43,7	37,6	9,1	4,8	2,7	2,1	—	6,1
9–17 Mar	ASAL	2.000	45,5	35,8	6,9	5,3	2,2	4,3	—	9,7
12–16 Mar	Piar	2.900	50,4	37,5	4,7	5,2	—	2,2	—	12,9
1–15 Mar	ADA	1.500	42,4	38,8	6,5	7,2	—	5,1	—	3,6
11–13 Mar	Özdemir	5.289	36,7	34,4	6,6	7,3	9,9	5,0	—	2,3
21 Şub-3 Mar	MAK	3.550	48	31	7	4	2	4	4	17
28 Şub-3 Mar	ORC	5.400	40,1	31,2	13,6	5,5	—	3,1	6,5	8,9
11–14 Feb	ALF	2.200	40,7	32,3	7,1	4,6	2,2	2,5	10,6	8,4
1–3 Feb	ORC	2.650	38,2	34,7	8,6	5,9	1,9	2,1	8,6	3,5
2024
15–19 Dec	ALF	2.700	49,2	34,5	6,3	6,5	—	—	3,5	14,7
2023
31 Mar 2019	2019 elections	2.667.297	58,1	38,7	—	—	—	4,2	—	19,4

== Results ==
=== Metropolitan municipality mayoral election ===
==== Overall result ====
Candidate	Party	Votes	%
Cemil Tugay	Republican People's Party	1,292,118	48.97
Hamza Dağ	Justice and Development Party	977,895	37.06
Akın Birdal	DEM Party	110,600	4.19
Ümit Özlale	Good Party	96,115	3.64
Naşit Birgüvi	Victory Party	66,436	2.52
Cemal Arıkan	New Welfare Party	24,428	0.93
Savaş Sarı	Communist Party of Turkey	9,392	0.36
Mustafa Erduran	Felicity Party	9,283	0.35
Burcu Bostancıoğlu	Democrat Party	9,241	0.35
Cüneyt Oğuz	Homeland Party	8,989	0.34
Yüksel Odabaşı	Independent Turkey Party	7,820	0.30
Serap Karaosmanoğlu	Democracy and Progress Party	6,068	0.23
Kemal Köroğlu	Labour Party	4,193	0.16
Serhan Bolluk	Patriotic Party	2,773	0.11
Kemal Cem Pülten	Democratic Left Party	2,719	0.10
Özler Çakır	People's Liberation Party	1,901	0.07
Deniz Çelik	Communist Movement of Turkey	1,570	0.06
Ali Sungur	Motherland Party	1,539	0.06
Sait Demir	Rights and Freedoms Party	1,190	0.05
Hüseyin Han	Anatolian Unity Party	1,128	0.04
Ayperi Köseoğlu	Justice Unity Party	1,111	0.04
Barış Ürkmeyen	Independent	433	0.02
Ege Öncü	Independent	410	0.02
Yasin Demirkıran	Independent	396	0.02
Umut Cesurer	Independent	297	0.01
Menderes Bozkurt	Independent	235	0.01
Cüneyt Aker	Independent	232	0.01
Total		2,638,512	100.00
Valid votes		2,638,512	96.50
Invalid/blank votes		95,595	3.50
Total votes		2,734,107	100.00
Registered voters/turnout		3,459,970	79.02
