= Haydar Baş =

Turkish politician and businessman (1947–2020)

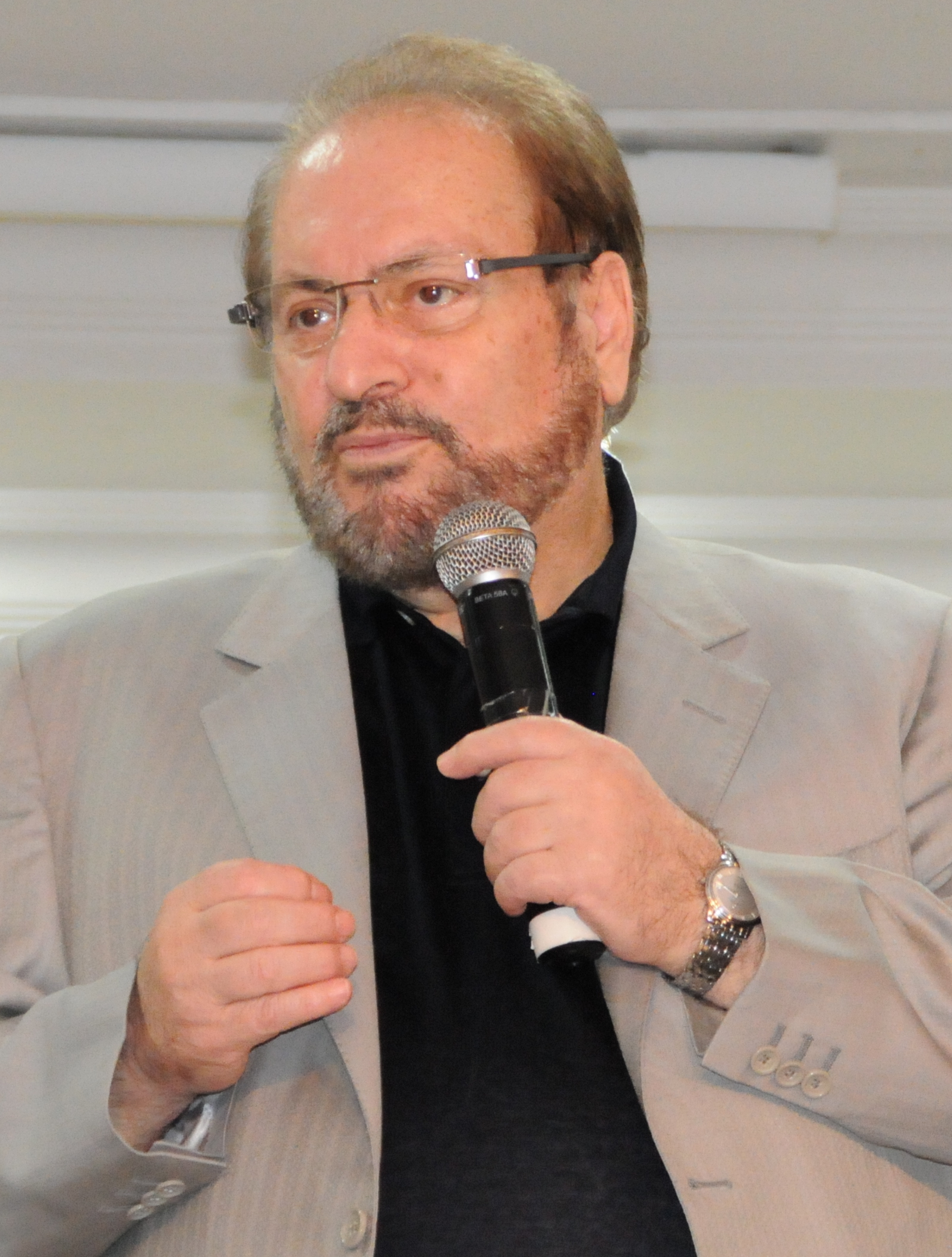
- Baş in 2012

Leader of the Independent Turkey Party
- In office 8 August 2002 – 14 April 2020
- Preceded by: Ali Gedik
- Succeeded by: Hüseyin Baş

Personal details
- Born: 28 January 1947 Trabzon, Turkey
- Died: 14 April 2020 (aged 73) Trabzon, Turkey
- Party: Independent Turkey Party
- Education: Kayseri Supreme Islamic Institute; Baku State University
- Occupation: Businessman, politician

Haydar Baş (28 January 1947 – 14 April 2020) was a Turkish politician and businessman.

He was one of the founders of the Independent Turkey Party and served as the party's leader until his death. He was also the owner of various media organizations such as Meltem TV, Mesaj TV and Öğüt, Mesaj, İcmal magazines together with Yeni Mesaj newspaper.

He died from complications of COVID-19 at a hospital in Trabzon on 14 April 2020.

== Education ==
Baş completed his primary, secondary and high school education in Trabzon. He graduated from Kayseri Supreme Islamic Institute in 1970. Later, he received his postgraduate education, doctorate and the title of "professor" from Baku State University. He later worked as a lecturer at the Faculty of Eastern Languages and Literature Research at Baku State University.

== Political career ==
Baş began his tenure in politics in 1970 by joining the National Salvation Party, but his time in the party was short-lived. Therein the leader of the National Salvation Party, Necmettin Erbakan, drove Baş away from the party as the two had contradictory views. In the following years, he stayed away from the parties led by Erbakan.

His interest in politics always continued, and he supported the True Path Party in the 1994 elections.

=== Independent Turkey Party ===
On 25 September 2001, Baş founded the Independent Turkey Party which he continued to lead until his death.

He became a recognized name in politics in the 2007 elections, thanks to his party's slogan. At a rally held in Ankara's Tandoğan square, the sentence "We want jobs, we want food, we want Haydar Baş in Ankara in this election (Turkish: İş istiyoruz, aş istiyoruz, bu seçimlerde Ankara'ya Haydar Baş'ı istiyoruz)", which was written on a farmer's banner, inspired them to use the slogan "Work, food, this time Haydar Baş (İş, aş, bu defa Haydar Baş)" which made the party known among the people. In the 2011 general elections, he was an MP nominee from the Democratic Party.

In the 2015 elections, he promised to "come upon ₺500 trillion with the national economy model and provide a [monthly] salary of ₺500 for everyone". In the 2017 Turkish constitutional referendum his party voted "no", and they did not participate in the June 2018 election.

=== Forgery of documents ===
In 2018, upon the complaint of doctor Mustafa Eraslan and his wife Meral Eraslan, a lawsuit was filed against him on the charges of "forcibly passing over someone else's property, attempting to plunder, and forgery of official documents" and his assets were also confiscated. In its decision of 16 October 2019, the Bakırköy 15th High Criminal Court sentenced Baş to two years and six months of imprisonment for forging documents, but he was acquitted of other charges.

== Criticism ==
Ahmet Mahmut Ünlü, also known as Cübbeli Ahmet, criticized Baş for relying on Shiite hadiths but not the Sunni ones in his religious analyses. Ünlü mentioned Baş's claim that Umar attacked Muhammad's daughter Fatimah at her house and caused her miscarriage was a Shiite view and had no place in Sunni traditions.

== Death ==
In his hometown, Trabzon, eight of his family members tested positive for COVID-19 amid the coronavirus pandemic. On 9 April, he started receiving treatment in a private hospital in the Akçaabat district. After receiving treatment for four days in the private hospital, he was taken to the intensive care unit as he needed respiratory support. He was transferred to the Kanuni Education and Research Hospital on 13 April. Baş died due to complications from COVID-19 on 14 April 2020. He was 73.

The funeral prayer for Baş was performed on the Trabzon Coast Road Side Yeni Mahalle Fair Area in Yenimahalle, in the Ortahisar district of Trabzon on 15 April. His son Osman Baş performed the funeral prayer. He was buried in the Martyrdom Hill in Akçaabat district. Trabzon Governor İsmail Ustaoğlu, Trabzon Police Chief Metin Alper, Trabzon Metropolitan Mayor Murat Zorluoğlu, Akçabat Mayor Osman Nuri Ekim and Ortahisar Mayor Ahmet Metin Genç attended the funeral prayer. After his death, his son Hüseyin Baş succeeded to the party's leadership.
