= 2019 Turkish local elections =

Municipal elections in Turkey

- 31 March 2019; 2 June (re-runs), 23 June (Istanbul re-run)

All 81 Provinces of Turkey 30 metropolitan and 1,351 district municipal mayors 1,251 provincial and 20,500 municipal councillors
- Opinion polls
- Turnout: 84.67%
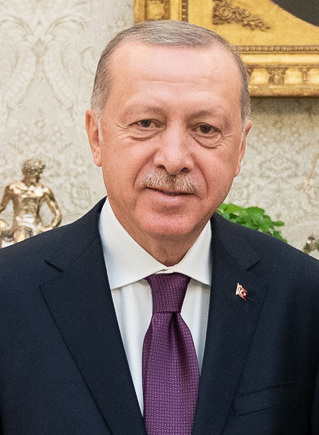

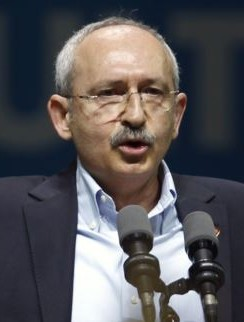

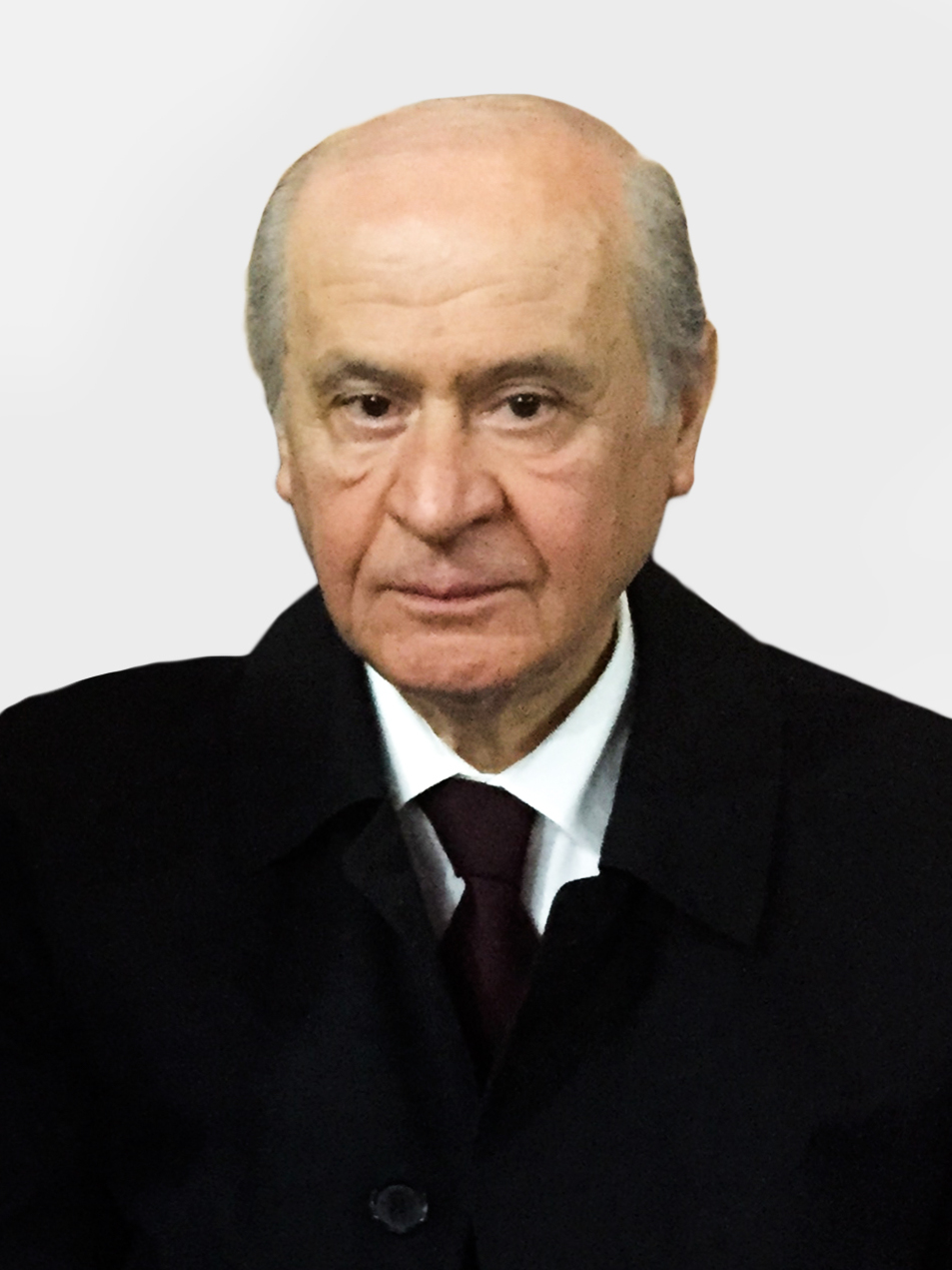

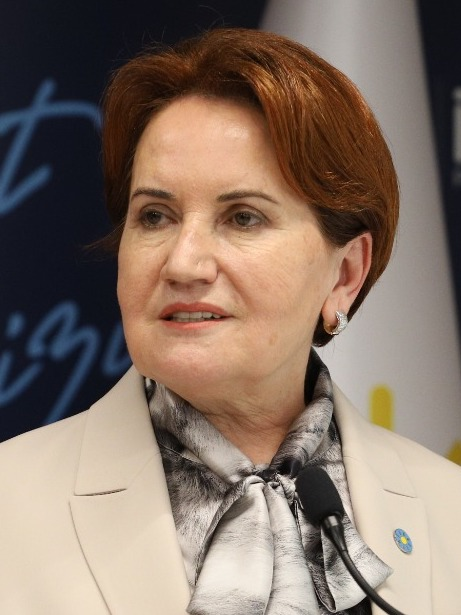

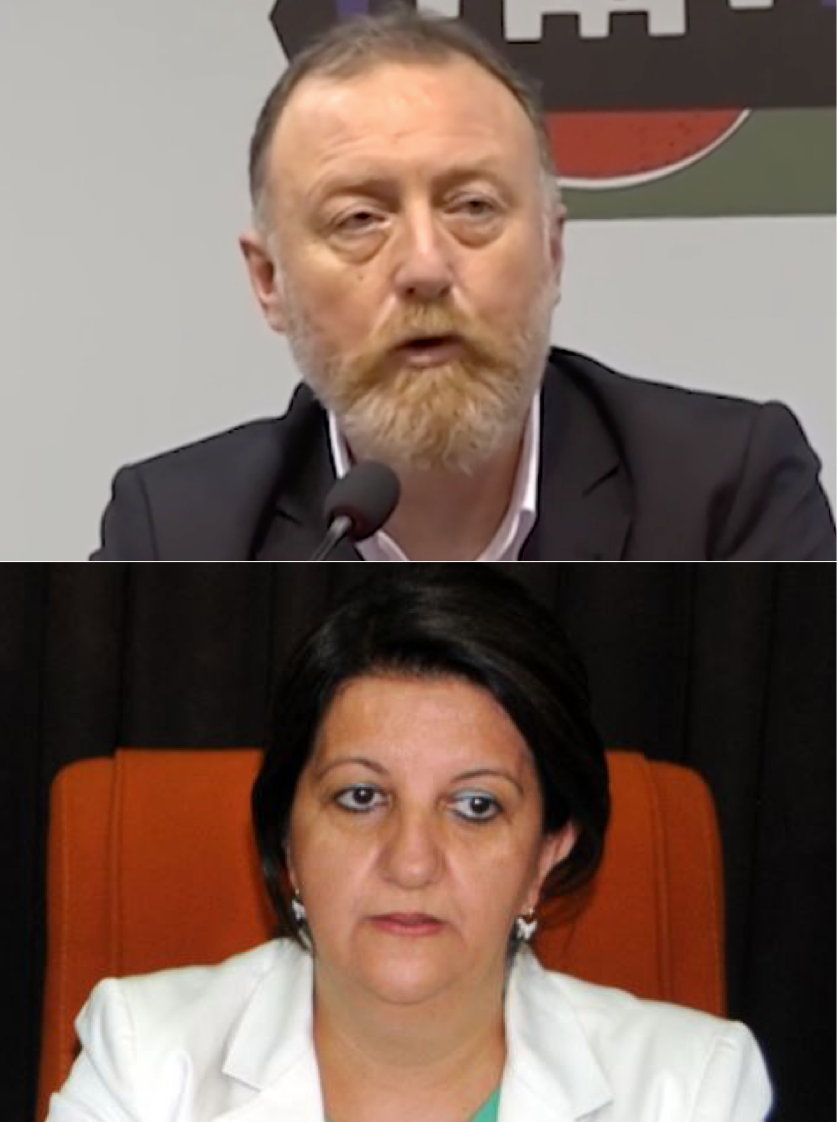
Leader	Recep Tayyip Erdoğan	Kemal Kılıçdaroğlu	Devlet Bahçeli
Party	AK Party	CHP	MHP
Alliance	People's Alliance	Nation Alliance	People's Alliance
Last election	48 provinces, 42.87%	14 provinces, 26.34%	8 provinces, 17.82%
Provinces (Note: The number of metropolitan mayoralties won in the 30 metropolitan provinces and provincial capital mayoralties won in other provinces.)	39	21	11
Change	▼9	▲7	▲3
Popular vote (Note: Shows the results of the municipal councillor elections, which is the most representative indicator of nationwide party voting intention. See the official results here.)	18,299,576	12,625,346	3,209,416
Percentage	42.56%	29.36%	7.46%
Swing	▼0.31 pp	▲3.02 pp	▼10.36 pp
Leader	Meral Akşener	Sezai Temelli; Pervin Buldan
Party	İYİ	HDP
Alliance	Nation Alliance
Last election	New party	10 provinces, 6.29% (Note: Total vote of the HDP and the BDP)
Provinces	0	8
Change	New	▼2
Popular vote	3,142,757	2,409,485
Percentage	7.31%	5.60%
Swing	New	▼0.69 pp
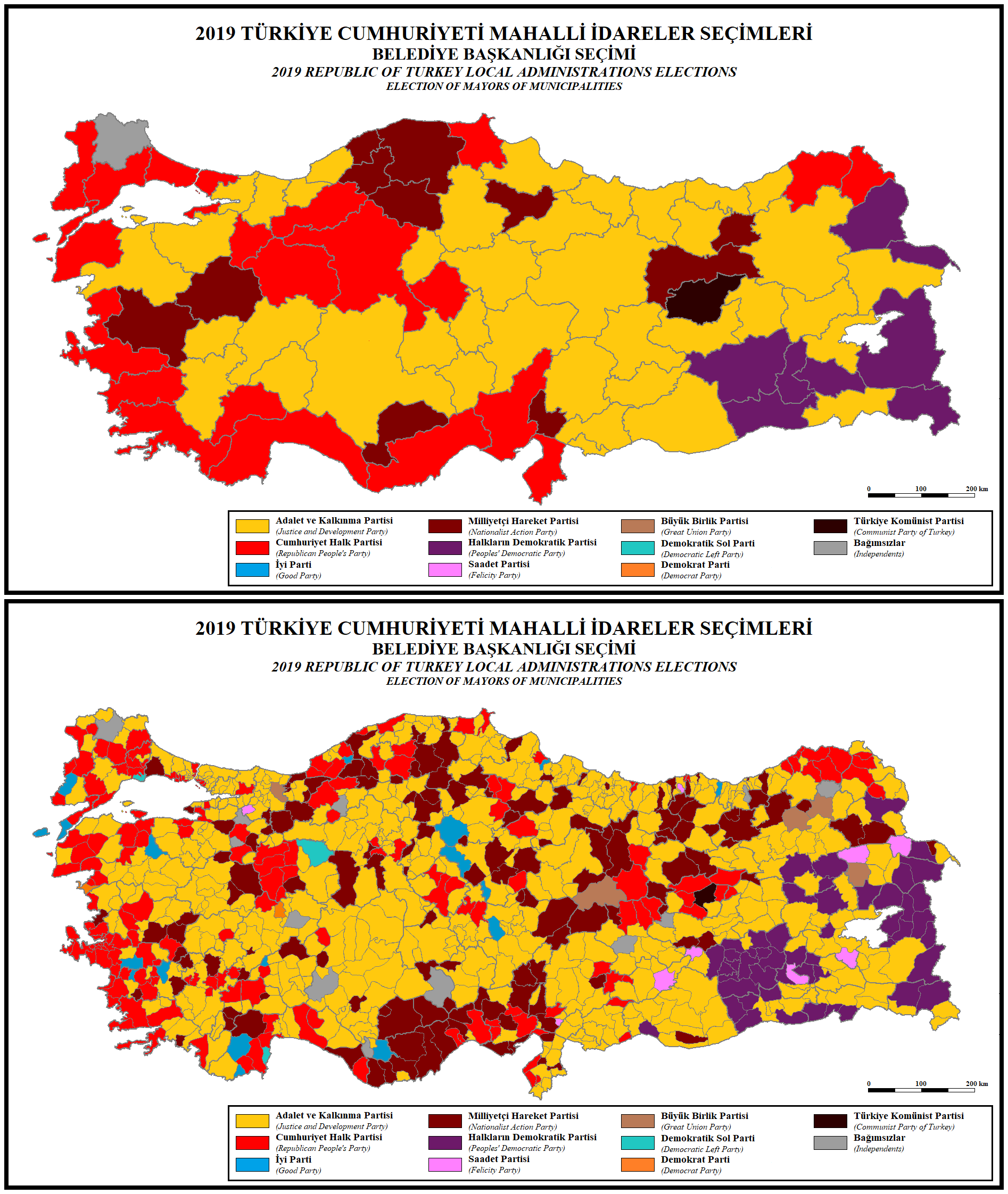
- Winners according to provincial capitals (top) and districts (bottom)

The Turkish local elections of 2019 were held on Sunday 31 March 2019 throughout the 81 provinces of Turkey. A total of 30 metropolitan and 1,351 district municipal mayors, alongside 1,251 provincial and 20,500 municipal councillors were elected, in addition to numerous local non-partisan positions such as neighbourhood representatives (muhtars) and elderly people's councils.

The governing Justice and Development Party (AK Party) and the Nationalist Movement Party (MHP) contested the elections in many provinces under a joint People's Alliance. Likewise, the Republican People's Party (CHP) and the İYİ Party entered some of the races under the Nation Alliance banner. The Peoples' Democratic Party (HDP) did not openly announce support for either alliance, but did not field candidates in some areas to improve the chances of opposition candidates. The strategic voting and the refraining from fielding candidates by the HDP in contested areas like Ankara, and Istanbul allowed the opposition parties to gain a majority in these cities, through cooperation.

Campaigning was described as distinctly negative and divisive, with the opposition blaming the government for Turkey's economic downturn and alleging misuse of public funds and corruption. In response, the government criticized the opposition parties for acting in the interests of foreign powers and terrorist groups, namely the PKK. Particular controversy surrounded the AK Party's allegations of financial fraud against the opposition's Ankara mayoral candidate Mansur Yavaş, which later turned out to have been made by an unverifiable source. The use of video footage of the Christchurch terrorist attack by AK Party leader and President Recep Tayyip Erdoğan during his election rallies caused diplomatic relations between Turkey and New Zealand to sour. Five people were killed and two were injured during political violence on election day, in two separate incidents in Gaziantep and Malatya. The election was criticized by some observers due to alleged media bias in favour of the governing People's Alliance.

The members of the Nation Alliance were initially beset with issues concerning candidate selection and inner-party divisions, stemming from their general election loss in June 2018. However, both the CHP and the İYİ Party collectively managed to outperform expectations, securing 'shock' victories in Turkey's major metropolitan areas. These included winning control of both Ankara and Istanbul, Turkey's capital and largest city respectively. The CHP also held control of İzmir, Turkey's third largest city, and now governs 5 of Turkey's 6 largest population centres (the only exception being Bursa, where the governing coalition narrowly won). The Communist Party won control of a provincial capital, namely Tunceli, for the first time. In provinces where the AK Party and MHP contested as separate parties, there was a substantial swing from AK Party candidates to the MHP. Nevertheless, AK Party leader and President Recep Tayyip Erdoğan claimed victory, and the People's Alliance indeed won the plurality of votes with just under 50%, while the opposition Nation Alliance won 38%.

The election was beset by a number of controversies, including an unexplained results blackout on election night just when the opposition were on the verge of victory in Istanbul. The Electoral Board also invalidated the successful election of by the approved candidates from the pro-Kurdish HDP and following awarded the mayorships to the AK Party. The Istanbul mayoral election, where CHP candidate Ekrem İmamoğlu defeated AK Party candidate and former Prime Minister Binali Yıldırım by just under 14,000 votes (0.17%), remained disputed for two weeks after the vote. This result was made public after a blackout, by which point the CHP candidate was up by more than 24,000 votes. Numerous recounts, electoral complaints, legal disputes, alleged corruption, accusations of terrorist involvement and police operations took place after the election, initiated mainly by the AK Party. İmamoğlu was sworn in as mayor, though a new election was held on 23 June. The result was an unexpected victory for İmamoğlu, who defeated Yıldırım, 54.2% to 45%.

== Background ==
Turkey holds local elections every five years in the final Sunday of March. The last election, held on 30 March 2014, resulted in a victory for the governing Justice and Development Party (AK Party), which won control of both Istanbul and Ankara, Turkey's top two cities. The main opposition Republican People's Party (CHP) came second, winning control of İzmir, Turkey's third largest city. The elections were the first test of support following widespread antigovernmental protests in Summer 2013 and a corruption scandal in December 2013. The elections resulted in numerous allegations of electoral fraud, as well as re-runs in districts such as Yalova and Ağrı where recounts and fraud allegations failed to return a decisive winner.

The 2019 elections followed two landmark elections that were held on 24 June 2018, namely a presidential vote and a parliamentary vote, where the incumbent President Recep Tayyip Erdoğan was re-elected with 52.59% of the vote. With his re-election, he assumed widely expanded executive powers that were approved by voters in a highly controversial constitutional referendum in 2017. His AK Party lost its majority in the Grand National Assembly but retains its majority with support from the Nationalist Movement Party (MHP), together with which the AK Party forms an electoral alliance named the People's Alliance. The 2019 local elections were the last scheduled elections to be held in Turkey until 14 May 2023.

=== Early election speculation ===
Following the election of the 27th Parliament of Turkey on 24 June 2018, the AK Party government publicly announced its intention to bring the local elections forward from March 2019 to November 2018. Although the opposition claimed they were ready for a local election, they did not publicly back the government's call. It was speculated that the government's desire for an early election was related to the sharp economic downturn that took place shortly after the June 2018 elections, with fears that it would lead to a reduction in the AK Party's vote share.

The dates of local elections are enshrined in the Constitution of Turkey, meaning that any motion to hold them on a different date would require a constitutional amendment. This would require a two-thirds majority in the Grand National Assembly or a three-fifths majority along with approval in a referendum. The People's Alliance between the AK Party and MHP only held 57% of the seats, making the proposal unrealistic. The government subsequently dropped plans to bring the poll forward.

== Positions elected ==
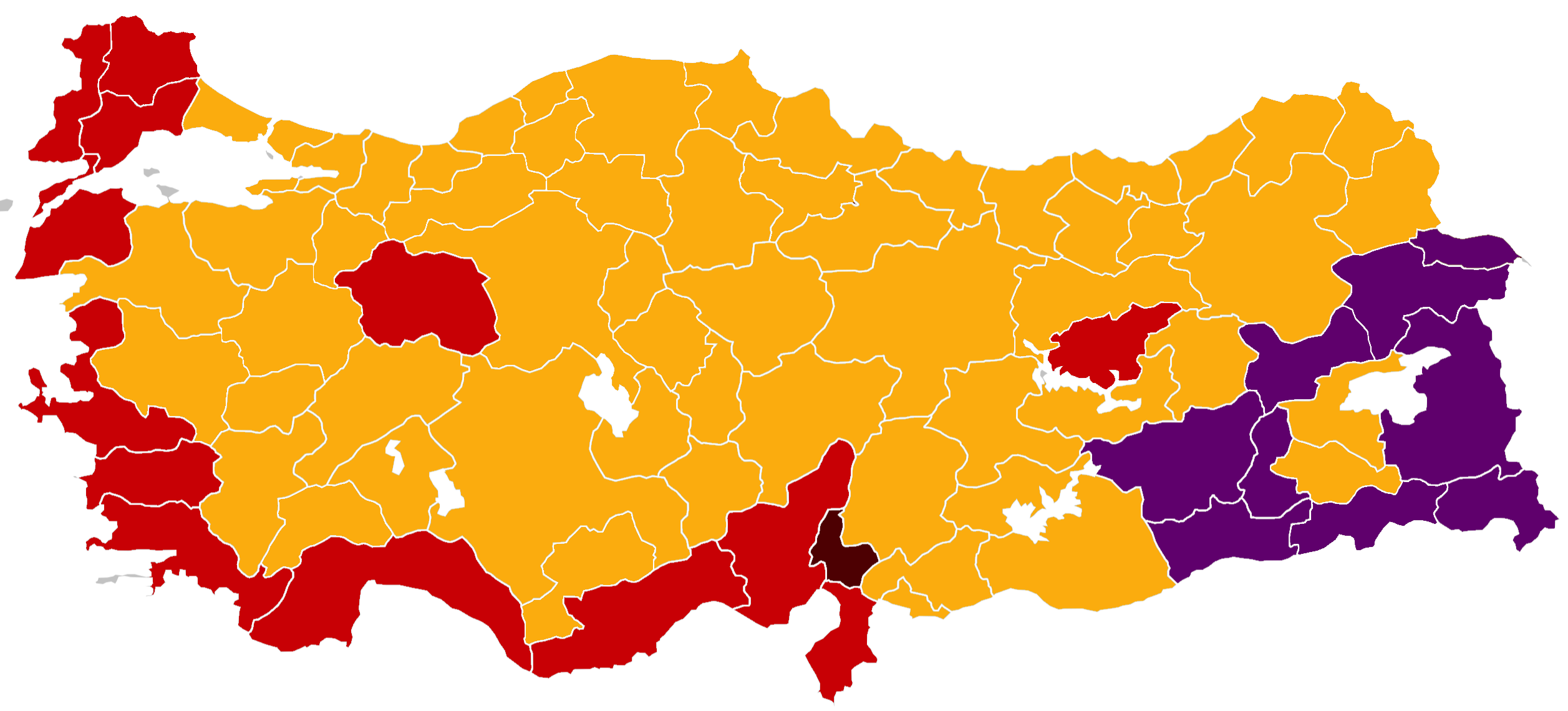
Results of provincial councillors

The 2019 local elections were the second to be held following the 2013 Turkish local government reorganisation, which merged several municipalities and substantially reduced the number of councillors and mayors elected. Mayors and councillors are elected separately. District municipalities consist of two types; actual district municipalities (of which there are 921) and 397 town municipalities that serve even smaller settlements in rural provinces. The elected positions are shown below.

Mayors
Type	Elected
Metropolitan municipality	30
District municipality	1,318

Councillors
Type	Elected
Municipal councillors	20,500
Provincial councillors	1,251

In addition to these partisan positions, numerous local non-partisan positions such as neighborhood presidents (muhtars) and elderly people's councils were elected. According to 2018 figures, the number of muhtars due to be elected is 50,229.

== Municipal changes since 2014 ==
=== Removal of mayors for malpractice ===
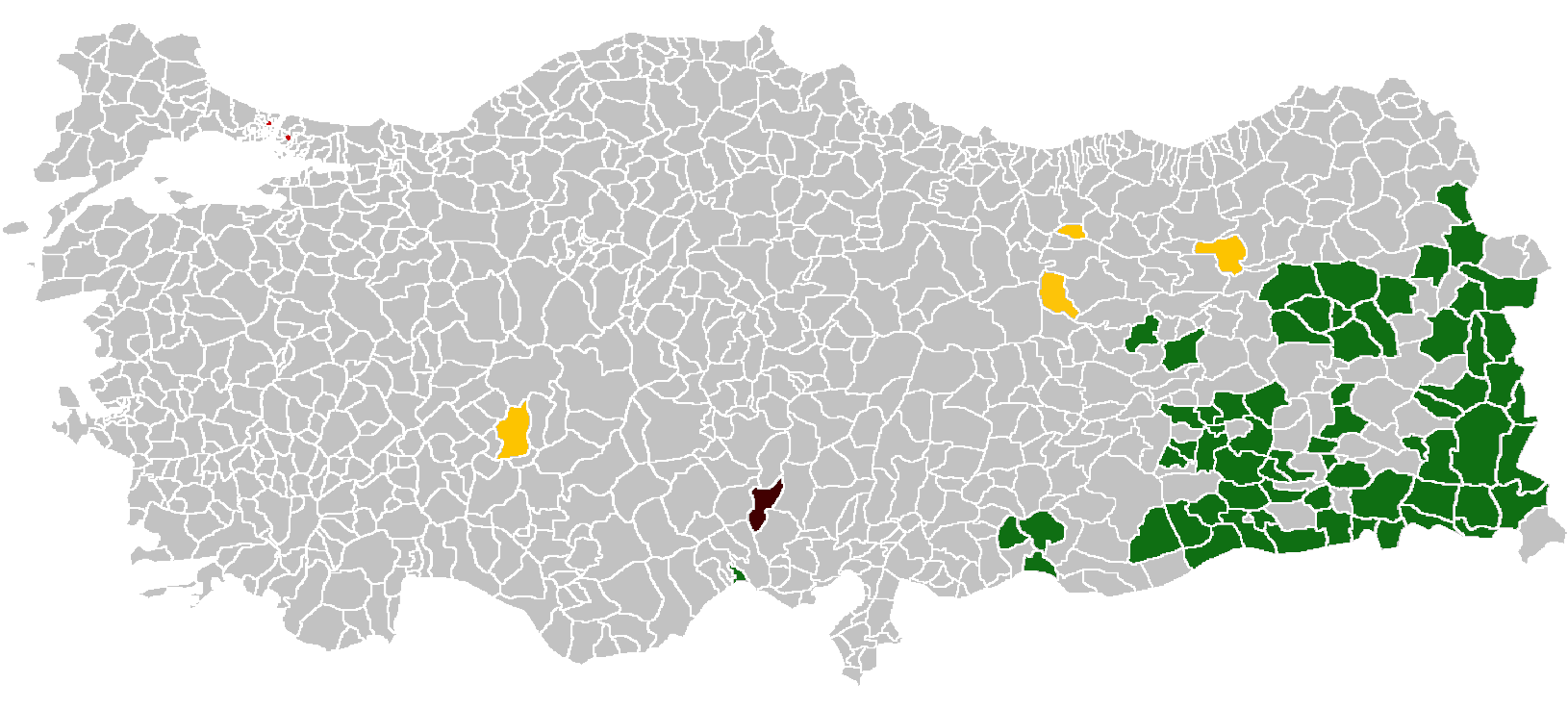
All districts where mayors have been removed from office between 2014 and 2019 DBP (92) – PKK terrorism charges AK Party (4) – FETÖ terrorism charges CHP (2) – Corruption charges MHP (1) – FETÖ terrorism charges

Following the 2016 Turkish coup d'état attempt on 15 July 2016, over 90 mayors from the Kurdish Nationalist Democratic Regions Party (DBP), were removed from office by the Interior Ministry and were temporarily replaced by government-appointed trustees. Most of these mayors were removed from office due to alleged support for Kurdistan Workers' Party (PKK). Several DBP district party executives were also suspended from office on terrorism charges. In addition, four AK Party mayors and one MHP mayor were removed after being arrested for allegedly aiding the Gülen movement, which is known by the Turkish Government and its supporters as the Fethullah Gülen Terrorist Organisation (FETÖ), who were accused of perpetrating the coup.

The removal of mayors and district party executives began with a state of emergency decree on 1 September 2016, with the district Kaymakam being given the role of acting mayor in some instances. As of 14 October 2018, four AK Party mayors, one MHP mayor and 94 DBP mayors have been removed from office.

In addition to removal on the grounds of national security, a number of mayors have been removed from office on corruption charges. In these cases, municipal councillors retained the right to appoint a successor, as opposed to the Interior Ministry appointing a trustee. On these grounds, the CHP mayors of Ataşehir and Beşiktaş, both districts of Istanbul, were removed from office on 8 December 2017 and 4 January 2018, respectively. The CHP slammed the decisions as politically motivated, but the CHP majorities in both councils were able to elect a CHP successor in their place.

=== 'Fatigue' resignations of AK Party mayors ===
On 30 May 2017, shortly after a controversial declaration of victory in the 2017 constitutional referendum and election as AK Party leader, President Erdoğan made a statement claiming that his party was suffering from 'metal fatigue' and called on poorly-performing party provincial executives to leave their posts. Seven AK Party provincial chairmen resigned their posts by the end of 2017 in response to Erdoğan's call. The intention of the AK Party executive to 'regenerate' the party resulted in pressure on some of the party's more controversial, long-serving or poorly-performing mayors to resign.

On 23 September 2017, Istanbul Mayor Kadir Topbaş, in office since 2004, resigned. This was followed by Düzce Mayor Mehmet Keleş on 2 October. On 18 October, the Mayor of Niğde, Faruk Akdoğan, resigned. On 23 October, the Mayor of Bursa, Recep Altepe, announced his resignation. On 27 October, Ankara Mayor Melih Gökçek resigned after weeks of unsuccessful negotiations with Erdoğan to retain his office. On 30 October, Balıkesir Mayor Edip Uğur also resigned after initially refusing to heed to the party executive's pressure. Making an emotional resignation statement, Uğur stated that his resignation was forced and that his family had received threats in the event he continued to resist.

On 18 September 2018, the AK Party Mayor of Ordu Enver Yılmaz announced his resignation. His resignation was seen as non-related to the 'metal fatigue' regeneration drive but due to personal disagreements with high-ranking party official and deputy leader Numan Kurtulmuş, who is an MP for Ordu.

=== Defections between parties ===
A number of mayors switched parties between 2014 and 2019. A number of these defections were down to the formation of the İyi Party, which took away substantial support from the Nationalist Movement Party. A total of 10 municipal mayors switched to İYİ between the party's establishment on 25 October 2017 and 2019. The Mayor of Mersin, Burhanettin Kocamaz, switched to İYİ from the MHP on 4 December 2018, becoming the party's first metropolitan mayor.

The Mayor of İnhisar in Bilecik, Ayhan Ödübek, joined CHP in 2018 having resigned from MHP in 2016. On 9 May 2017, Mayor Mustafa Gül of Kemer, in Antalya, resigned from MHP and joined CHP. On 20 October 2018, Mayor Rasim Daşhan of Şaphane, in Kütahya, resigned from CHP and joined AK Party. On 13 November 2018, Mayor Gökhan Demirtaş of Gülüç, a small town in the Ereğli district of Zonguldak, resigned from CHP and joined AK Party.

== Parties and alliances ==
Due to the first-past-the-post system used to elect mayors, the elections were preceded by several inter-party negotiations and calculations of tactical voting to improve the chances of defeating the candidates of certain parties. Three broad alliances were formed in the run-up to the vote. Unlike in parliamentary elections where electoral alliances have legal foundations and affect the translation of votes into seats, the alliances formed for local elections do not have any legal foundations and merely consist of parties withdrawing their candidates in support for another.

The table below shows which party within the two alliances are contesting each provincial capital district. If the alliance agreement has not extended to that provincial capital and both parties of the alliance are contesting, then 'both' is shown in that alliance's column.

Province	People	Nation
Adana	MHP	CHP
Adıyaman	Both	İYİ
Afyon	Both	İYİ
Ağrı	AK Party	Both
Amasya	Both	CHP
Ankara	AK Party	CHP
Antalya	AK Party	CHP
Artvin	AK Party	CHP
Aydın	AK Party	CHP
Balıkesir	AK Party	İYİ
Bilecik	AK Party	CHP
Bingöl	Both	CHP
Bitlis	AK Party	Both
Bolu	AK Party	CHP
Burdur	AK Party	CHP
Bursa	AK Party	CHP
Çanakkale	AK Party	CHP

Province	People	Nation
Çankırı	Both	Both
Çorum	Both	Both
Denizli	AK Party	İYİ
Diyarbakır	AK Party	CHP
Edirne	AK Party	CHP
Elazığ	Both	İYİ
Erzincan	Both	CHP
Erzurum	AK Party	Both
Eskişehir	AK Party	CHP
Gaziantep	AK Party	İYİ
Giresun	AK Party	CHP
Gümüşhane	Both	Both
Hakkâri	AK Party	Both
Hatay	AK Party	CHP
Isparta	Both	İYİ
Mersin	MHP	Both
Istanbul	AK Party	CHP

Province	People	Nation
İzmir	AK Party	CHP
Kars	MHP	Both
Kastamonu	Both	CHP
Kayseri	AK Party	İYİ
Kırklareli	MHP	CHP
Kırşehir	Both	CHP
Kocaeli	AK Party	İYİ
Konya	AK Party	İYİ
Kütahya	Both	Both
Malatya	AK Party	CHP
Manisa	MHP	İYİ
Kahramanmaraş	AK Party	CHP
Mardin	AK Party	Both
Muğla	AK Party	CHP
Muş	AK Party	CHP
Nevşehir	Both	İYİ
Niğde	Both	Both

Province	People	Nation
Ordu	AK Party	CHP
Rize	AK Party	Both
Sakarya	AK Party	İYİ
Samsun	AK Party	İYİ
Siirt	AK Party	Both
Sinop	AK Party	CHP
Sivas	Both	CHP
Tekirdağ	AK Party	CHP
Tokat	Both	İYİ
Trabzon	Both	İYİ
Tunceli	Both	CHP
Şanlıurfa	AK Party	SP*
Uşak	Both	Both
Van	AK Party	Both
Yozgat	Both	İYİ
Zonguldak	Both	CHP
Aksaray	Both	İYİ

Province	People	Nation
Bayburt	Both	Both
Karaman	Both	Both
Kırıkkale	Both	İYİ
Batman	Both	Both
Şırnak	AK Party	CHP
Bartın	Both	CHP
Ardahan	AK Party	Both
Iğdır	MHP	N/A^
Yalova	AK Party	CHP
Karabük	Both	İYİ
Kilis	Both	İYİ
Osmaniye	MHP	İYİ
Düzce	Both	İYİ

* The Felicity Party (SP) was not part of the Nation Alliance in this election, but both Nation Alliance parties supported the SP candidate in Şanlıurfa due to a higher chance of winning.

^ In Iğdır, the Nation Alliance did not exist and the İYİ Party supported the Nationalist Movement Party (MHP) candidate, who was the joint candidate of the People's Alliance. The İYİ Party announced its decision was because they would prefer the MHP candidate winning, as opposed to the HDP candidate.

=== People's Alliance (AK Party and MHP) ===
The People's Alliance was founded in February 2018 between the AK Party and MHP as a union of parties supporting the re-election of President Recep Tayyip Erdoğan in the 2018 presidential election. During the election campaign, the two parties were joined by the Great Union Party (BBP) and stated that the alliance would last until the next general elections 2023.

Speculation continued after the 2018 general election as to whether the People's Alliance would remain for the local elections. Despite initial mixed signals, MHP leader Devlet Bahçeli announced in September 2018 that he intended to support AK Party candidates in key races and continue the alliance into the local election. After a series of disagreements with the AK Party, particularly in relation to the reinsertion of the Student Oath, the MHP announced that it would be contesting the elections alone. The 'temporary suspension' of the alliance was subsequently confirmed by Erdoğan. However, a month later after a meeting between the two leaders, the Alliance was declared to have resumed, with the MHP subsequently pullana its candidates in favour of the AK Party in numerous provinces, such as Ankara and Istanbul.

=== Nation Alliance (CHP and İYİ) ===
The Nation Alliance was the main opposition alliance during the 2018 general election, being formed by the CHP, the İyi Party, the Democrat Party and the Felicity Party. The Alliance was declared to have formally dissolved shortly after the elections. However, negotiations of a local election alliance between the CHP and the İyi Party continued in the latter months of 2018. The alliance was finalised on 12 December, with the İyi Party agreeing to not field mayoral candidates in Aydın, Muğla, Tekirdağ, Hatay, İzmir, Eskişehir, Ankara, Istanbul, Antalya, Bursa or Adana. Both parties would field a candidate in Mersin while the CHP would support the İyi Party's candidate in Balıkesir.

On 18 December 2018, the CHP and İyi Party's joint candidate in Ankara was announced to be Mansur Yavaş, who narrowly lost to the AK Party's candidate Melih Gökçek in the 2014 local election amid allegations of fraud. Upon announcing his candidacy, Yavaş declared himself to be the 'Nation Alliance' candidate.

=== HDP-DBP Alliance ===
With the establishment of the Peoples' Democratic Party (HDP) in 2012, the existing dominant pro-Kurdish party, the Peace and Democracy Party (BDP) restructured itself into a purely local election-based organisation and renamed itself to Democratic Regions Party (DBP). In the 2014 local elections, the DBP contested areas with a significant Kurdish population while the HDP ran in provinces where Kurdish populations were minimal. While the DBP won 100 mayors in 2014, the HDP failed to win any municipalities and won just 9 municipal councillors.

In August 2018, it was announced that the existing relationship between the HDP and DBP, where the latter would contest Kurdish populated regions, would be abandoned and the HDP would contest the election throughout the whole country. The DBP announced its support for the HDP, with both parties launching a joint campaign workshop in Diyarbakır on 20 October. The parties announced that other Kurdish parties were welcome to join their alliance, while stating that there was no intention to form an alliance with the main opposition CHP. On 6 January 2019, six Kurdish parties agreed to join HDP after negotiations. The parties are Communist Party of Kurdistan, the Freedom Movement, the Revolutionary Eastern Culture Associations, the Human and Freedom Party, the Kurdish Democratic Platform and the Kurdistan Democratic Party – Turkey.

== Controversies and issues ==
Due to the small number of votes needed to swing the election results in some low-population districts, local elections in Turkey are known to experience more cases of alleged fraud than legislative or presidential elections. This was the case in the 2014 Turkish local elections where severe cases were reported in Ankara (where the 2014 mayoral vote remains disputed to this day), Yalova (where the election had to be repeated) and other important provinces such as Istanbul, Eskişehir and Antalya. The 2014 election marked the first time a ballot official was sentenced to prison for electoral fraud, having been caught transferring opposition votes to the ruling AK Party candidate.

=== 'Fake voters' controversy ===
The preliminary electoral roll was published in January 2018 to allow voters to check their polling districts and make any changes during a 'complaint period'. Following the publication of voter lists, many opposition politicians alleged that voters had been deliberately switched from one district to a neighbouring district as a means of tipping the result to favour a certain candidate. Similar allegations have been made in the run-up to elections in the past.

On 6 January, the Mayor of the CHP-held Istanbul district of Adalar publicised some research into the changes in his district's electoral roll between the 24 June 2018 elections and 2019, where the number of voters substantially increased by 7% in the space of six months. The research found that up to 500 (56%) of the new voters had been transferred to Adalar from neighbouring districts such as Sultanbeyli, which are heavily pro-AK Party and thus have an excess of AK Party voters. Their addresses were recorded at either uninhabitable buildings or the local AK Party district offices. The move, which the mayor claimed to be an attempt by the government to engineer the result in Adalar to result in his defeat, was branded 'the biggest fake voter scandal in the history of the Republic'.

In an effort to identify fake voters in other parts of the country, the local CHP offices in Balçova, İzmir announced the formation of a team of 200 people to raise awareness and locate electoral roll fraud.

=== HDP mayorships awarded to the AK Party ===
The Electoral Board has refused to acknowledge the successful election of ten previously approved HDP candidates by the same Electoral Board on grounds that the candidates were dismissed from public office before. Following those HDP mayorships were awarded to the candidates of the AK Party.

=== Burhanettin Kocamaz, Mersin mayor ===
The Provincial Electoral Council has not ratified the mayoral candidacy of Burhanettin Kocamaz, who is running for the southern province of Mersin's metropolitan municipality on the İYİ Party's ticket. "İYİ Party, which has been encountering many difficulties and tricks, is going through another hoop today. The candidate lists, determined after months of work, have been submitted to the provincial electoral boards. But the candidacy document of Mr. Burhanettin Kocamaz, our candidate for Mersin Metropolitan Municipality, was not accepted by the election board on grounds that it was submitted after 5 p.m." said İYİ Party in a written statement on 19 February. The party's statement also stressed that Kocamaz was a candidate likely to win a "landslide victory" in Mersin Province Meanwhile, Kocamaz called the incident a case of "betrayal" and "an inside job." Later, Kocamaz was nominated on Democrat Party list. However Supreme Electoral Council (YSK) rejected his candidacy after İYİ Party made an objection to Provincial Electoral Council's statement. Later on 28 February, Ayfer Yılmaz, former Minister of State was nominated as İYİ Party candidate on Democrat Party list.

=== Mass detention camps of Uyghurs ===
In February 2019, after many democratic countries raised concerns about China's cultural genocide against Muslims for years, Turkish Foreign Ministry spokesman and President Recep Tayyip Erdogan condemns the systematic assimilation, arbitrary arrests, cruel torture, political brainwashing in internment camps and prisons of more than one million Uyghurs and other Muslim communities by China and called on to end the human tragedy. Erdogan and AK Party break its silence on Uyghurs, who share cultural and linguistic similarities with other Turkic ethnic groups but suffered long-time mistreatment by China as facing pressure from the ruling coalition Nationalist Movement Party and opposition parties such as Good Party, Felicity Party, Great Union Party. Large pan-Turkic solidarity nationalism rallies to protest AK Party's inaction over the oppressive crackdown to Uyghurs mounts pressure ahead of the elections.

=== Christchurch video at rallies ===
During some rallies President Erdoğan repeatedly showed video taken by the Christchurch mosque shooter to his supporters at campaign rallies for upcoming elections and said Australians and New Zealanders who came to Turkey with anti-Muslim sentiments "would be sent back in coffins like their grandfathers were" during the Gallipoli Campaign of World War I.

Australian Prime Minister Scott Morrison condemned the "reckless" and "highly offensive" comments made by Erdoğan.

=== Violence ===
In Pütürge, province of Malatya, a polling station official and an election observer by Saadet Party were shot dead by an AK Party member for stopping his attempt to make people cast open votes. In other districts violence between AK Party and opposition broke out during the day of the elections and in the following week.

Violence between police and opposition observer came out in South East regions. The celebration of the victory next to the main HDP buildings have been prevented by the intervention of police in many Kurdish districts such Diyarbakir, Batman and Siirt, HDP centres have been surrounded and forcefully emptied for public order.

The head of the observer mission from the Council of Europe's Congress of Local and Regional Authorities stated that they were "not fully convinced that Turkey currently has the free and fair electoral environment which is necessary for genuinely democratic elections in line with European values and principles".

== Opinion polls ==
A number of opinion polls were conducted in the run-up to the election to gauge voting intentions. These included studies to predict overall vote shares and also the outcome of mayoral races in key cities. These can be viewed here.

=== Nation-wide summary ===
The below table shows nationwide opinion polls conducted to gauge overall vote shares.

Date	Pollster	Sample	AK Party	CHP	MHP	HDP	İYİ	Others	Lead
31 March 2019	Local elections 2019	–	42.5	29.6	7.2	5.6	7.4	7.7	14.2
26 February 2019	Konsensus	–	40.7	33.6	6.4	4.7	4.1	10.5	7.1
28 Dec 2018 – 3 Jan 2019	OPTIMAR	252	45.5	28.6	7.6	7.6	7.7	3.1	16.9
7–13 Oct 2018	ORC	5,186	40.3	29.7	19.5	6.3	2.9	1.1	10.6
11 July 2016	AKAM	8,890	40.6	32.3	11.7	11.6	—N/a	3.8	8.3
30 March 2014	Local elections 2014	43,543,717	42.9	26.3	17.8	6.3	—N/a	6.8	16.5

== Results ==
=== Key races ===
Mayoral races in major cities that received major coverage during and after the elections are summarised below.

Istanbul (annulled) Metropolitan Mayor
Ekrem İmamoğlu	48.77%
Binali Yıldırım	48.61%
Others	2.62%
Winner: Ekrem İmamoğlu, CHP (margin: 0.16%); **CHP** GAIN from AK PARTY

İzmir Metropolitan Mayor
Tunç Soyer	58.09%
Nihat Zeybekçi	38.68%
Others	3.23%
Winner: Tunç Soyer, CHP (margin: 19.41%); **CHP** HOLD

Istanbul (re-run) Metropolitan Mayor
Ekrem İmamoğlu	54.21%
Binali Yıldırım	44.99%
Others	0.80%
Winner: Ekrem İmamoğlu, CHP (margin: 9.22%); **CHP** GAIN from AK PARTY

Bursa Metropolitan Mayor
Alinur Aktaş	49.62%
Mustafa Bozbey	47.03%
Others	3.35%
Winner: Alinur Aktaş, AK Party (margin: 2.59%); **AK PARTY** HOLD

Ankara Metropolitan Mayor
Mansur Yavaş	50.93%
Mehmet Özhaseki	47.12%
Others	1.95%
Winner: Mansur Yavaş, CHP (margin: 3.81%); **CHP** GAIN from AK PARTY

Antalya Metropolitan Mayor
Muhittin Böcek	50.62%
Menderes Türel	46.27%
Others	3.11%
Winner: Muhittin Böcek, CHP (margin: 4.35%); **CHP** GAIN from AK PARTY

Party	**Justice and Development Party**; AK Party	**Republican People's Party**; CHP	**Good Party**; İYİ	**Nationalist Movement Party**; MHP	**Peoples' Democratic Party**; HDP	**Felicity Party**; SAADET	**Democratic Left Party**; DSP	**Democratic Party**; DP	**Communist Party**; TKP
Leader	Recep Tayyip Erdoğan	Kemal Kılıçdaroğlu	Meral Akşener	Devlet Bahçeli	Sezai Temelli; Pervin Buldan	Temel Karamollaoğlu	Önder Aksakal	Gültekin Uysal	Aydemir Güler
Leader							–		–
Metropolitan Municipalities	15 / 30 (50.00%)	11 / 30 (36.67%)	0 / 30 (0.00%)	1 / 30 (3.33%)	3 / 30 (10.00%)	0 / 30 (0.00%)	0 / 30 (0.00%)	0 / 30 (0.00%)	0 / 30 (0.00%)
District Municipalities	742 / 1,351 (56.47%)	241 / 1,351 (17.83%)	24 / 1,351 (1.77%)	233 / 1,351 (17.24%)	57 / 1,351 (4.21%)	21 / 1,351 (1.55%)	7 / 1,351 (0.52%)	8 / 1,351 (0.59%)	1 / 1,351 (0.07%)
Metropolitan Councillors	10,173 / 20,498 (49.04%)	4,613 / 20,498 (22.24%)	1,092 / 20,498 (5.26%)	2,819 / 20,498 (13.59%)	1,293 / 20,498 (5.93%)	295 / 20,498 (1.42%)	98 / 20,498 (0.47%)	135 / 20,498 (0.65%)	11 / 20,498 (0.05%)
Provincial Councillors	757 / 1,251 (59.51%)	184 / 1,251 (14.47%)	23 / 1,251 (1.81%)	188 / 1,251 (14.78%)	101 / 1,251 (7.94%)	3 / 1,251 (0.24%)	0 / 1,251 (0.0%)	1 / 1,251 (0.08%)	3 / 1,251 (0.24%)

=== Metropolitan municipality results ===
2019 metropolitan municipality mayoral results

Abbreviation	Party	Popular vote	Vote percentage	Swing	Metropolitan municipalities won	Mayor change
AKP	Justice & Development Party	16,000,992	44.29%	▼1.25%	15	▼3
CHP	Republican People's Party	12,721,822	35.21%	▲4.17%	11	▲5
İYİ	Good Party	2,607,640	7.22%	▲7.22%	0	±0
MHP	Nationalist Movement Party	1,418,091	3.93%	▼9.72%	1	▼2
HDP	Peoples' Democratic Party	1,137,552	3.15%	▲0.81%	3	▲3
SP	Felicity Party	942,939	2.61%	▲0.95%	0	±0
DSP	Democratic Left Party	401,165	1.11%	▲0.97%	0	±0
Ind.	Independents	397,205	1.10%	▲0.51%	0	▼1
DP	Democrat Party	243,250	0.67%	▲0.46%	0	±0
BTP	Independent Turkey Party	112,685	0.31%	▲0.13%	0	±0
VP	Patriotic Party	89,348	0.25%	▲0.25%	0	±0
TKP	Turkish Communist Party	54,153	0.15%	▲0.12%	0	±0

=== Changes in control ===
The list below shows the parties governing the capitals of the 81 provinces before and after the local elections. Provinces in bold denote metropolitan municipalities.

Summary
Party / alliance:
Before:
Elected:
Change:

Party totals
AK Party	CHP	MHP	HDP	İYİ	Others
48	14	7	0	1	11
39	21	11	8	0	2
-9	+7	+4	+8	-1	-9

Alliance totals
People	Nation	HDP	Non-aligned
55	15	0	11
50	21	8	2
-5	+6	+8	-9

==== Full list ====
Province	Before	Elected
**Adana**	MHP	CHP
Adıyaman	AK Party	AK Party
Afyon	AK Party	AK Party
Ağrı	IND	AK Party
Amasya	AK Party	MHP
**Ankara**	AK Party	CHP
**Antalya**	AK Party	CHP
Artvin	AK Party	CHP
**Aydın**	CHP	CHP
**Balıkesir**	AK Party	AK Party
Bilecik	AK Party	CHP
Bingöl	AK Party	AK Party
Bitlis	IND	AK Party
Bolu	AK Party	CHP
Burdur	CHP	CHP
**Bursa**	AK Party	AK Party
Çanakkale	CHP	CHP

Province	Before	Elected
Çankırı	AK Party	MHP
Çorum	AK Party	AK Party
**Denizli**	AK Party	AK Party
**Diyarbakır**	IND	HDP
Edirne	CHP	CHP
Elazığ	AK Party	AK Party
Erzincan	AK Party	MHP
**Erzurum**	AK Party	AK Party
**Eskişehir**	CHP	CHP
**Gaziantep**	AK Party	AK Party
Giresun	CHP	AK Party
Gümüşhane	AK Party	AK Party
Hakkâri	IND	HDP
**Hatay**	CHP	CHP
Isparta	MHP	AK Party
**Mersin**	İYİ	CHP
**Istanbul**	AK Party	CHP

Province	Before	Elected
**İzmir**	CHP	CHP
Kars	MHP	HDP
Kastamonu	AK Party	MHP
**Kayseri**	AK Party	AK Party
Kırklareli	CHP	IND
Kırşehir	AK Party	CHP
**Kocaeli**	AK Party	AK Party
**Konya**	AK Party	AK Party
Kütahya	AK Party	MHP
**Malatya**	AK Party	AK Party
**Manisa**	MHP	MHP
**K. Maraş**	AK Party	AK Party
**Mardin**	IND	HDP
**Muğla**	CHP	CHP
Muş	AK Party	AK Party
Nevşehir	AK Party	AK Party
Niğde	AK Party	AK Party

Province	Before	Elected
**Ordu**	AK Party	AK Party
Rize	AK Party	AK Party
**Sakarya**	AK Party	AK Party
**Samsun**	AK Party	AK Party
Siirt	IND	HDP
Sinop	CHP	CHP
Sivas	AK Party	AK Party
**Tekirdağ**	CHP	CHP
Tokat	AK Party	AK Party
**Trabzon**	AK Party	AK Party
Tunceli	IND	CPT
**Şanlıurfa**	AK Party	AK Party
Uşak	AK Party	AK Party
**Van**	IND	HDP
Yozgat	IND	AK Party
Zonguldak	CHP	AK Party
Aksaray	AK Party	AK Party

Province	Before	Elected
Bayburt	AK Party	MHP
Karaman	AK Party	MHP
Kırıkkale	AK Party	AK Party
Batman	IND	HDP
Şırnak	IND	AK Party
Bartın	MHP	MHP
Ardahan	AK Party	CHP
Iğdır	HDP	HDP
Yalova	CHP	CHP
Karabük	MHP	MHP
Kilis	AK Party	AK Party
Osmaniye	MHP	MHP
Düzce	AK Party	AK Party

=== Maps ===
==== By district ====
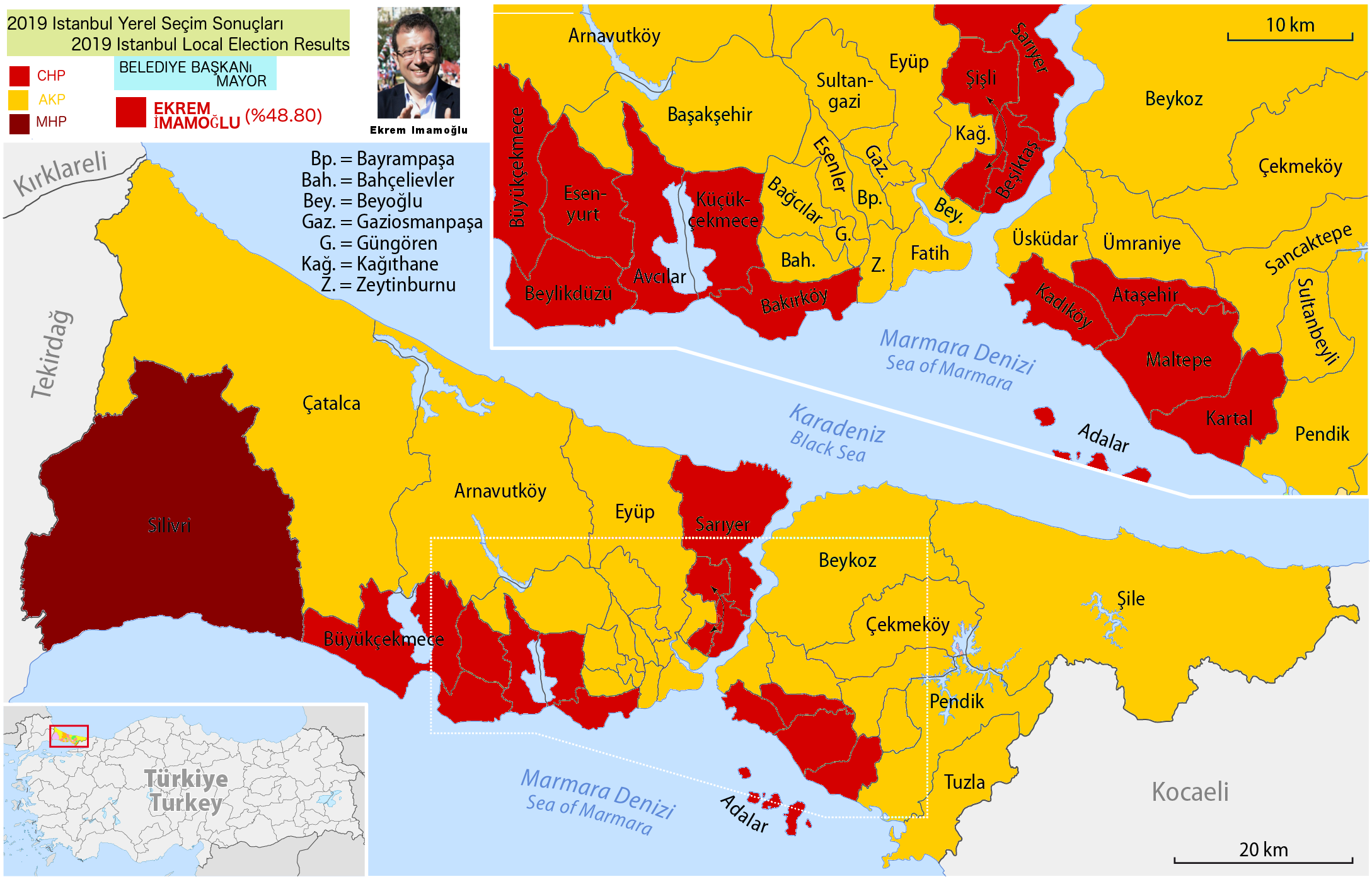
İstanbul

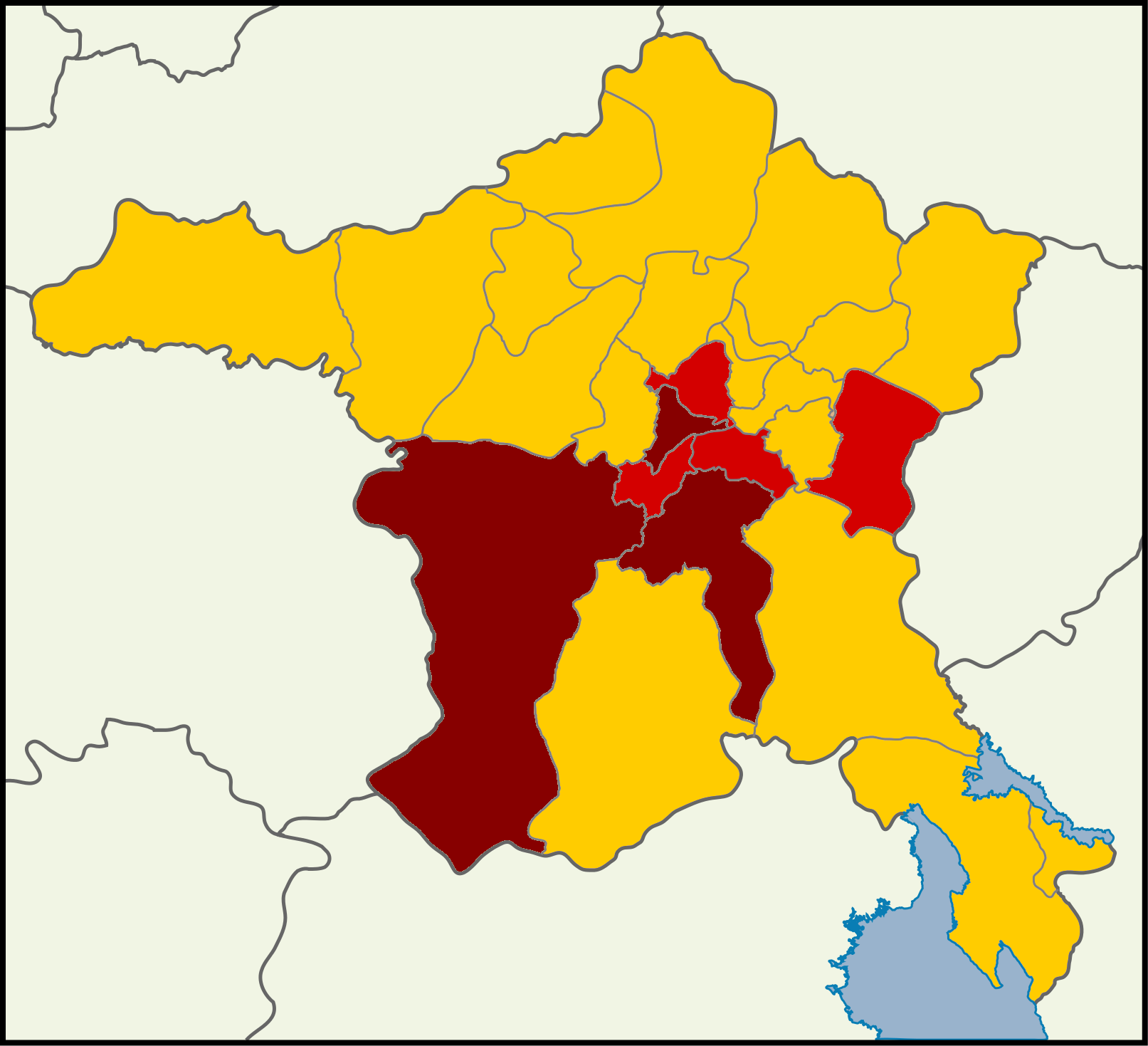
Ankara

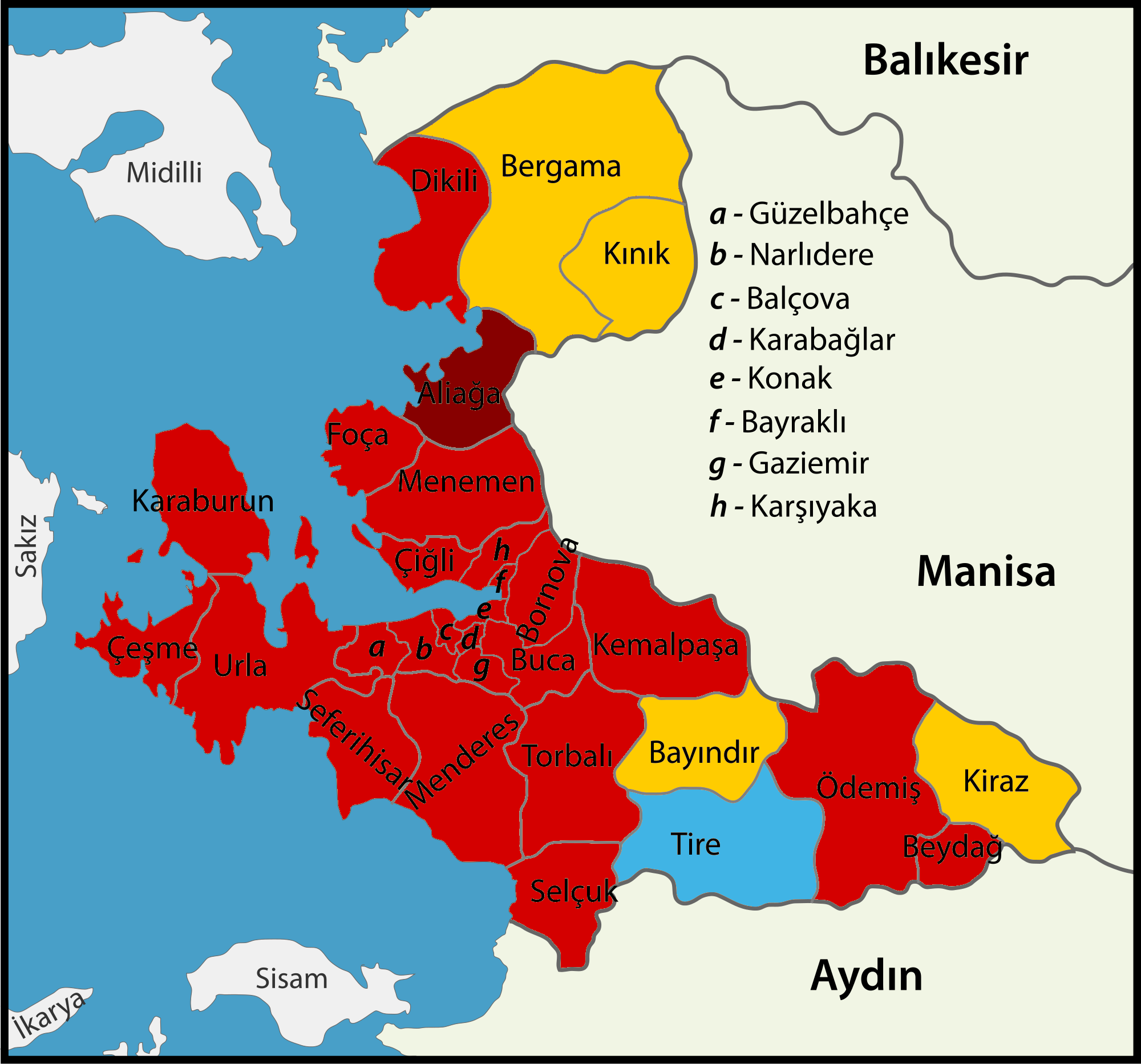
İzmir

==== By province ====
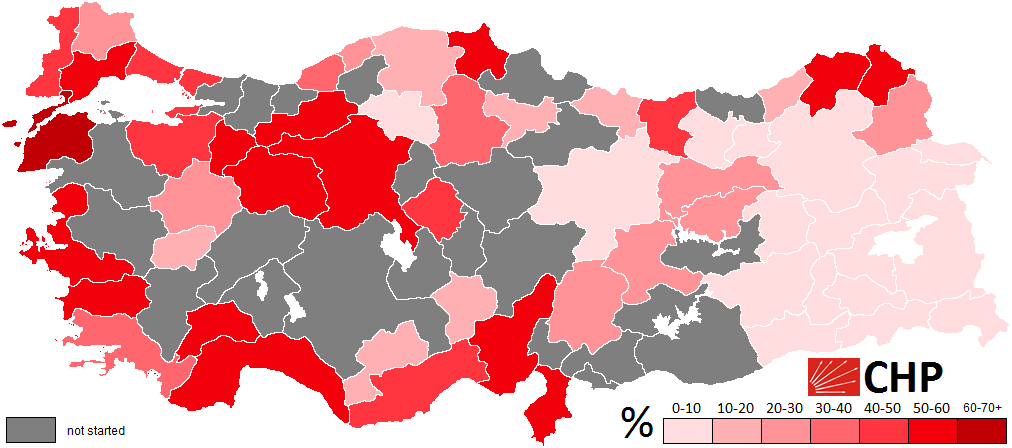
Results obtained by the CHP by province

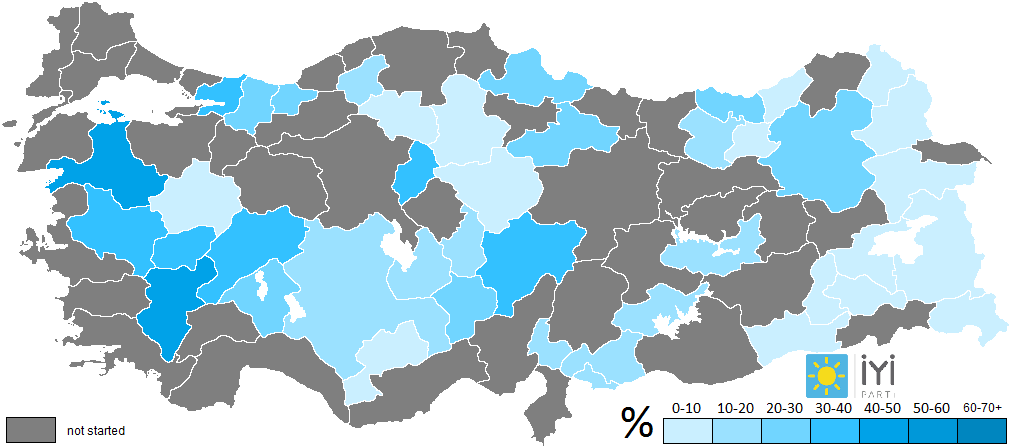
Results obtained by the Good Party by province

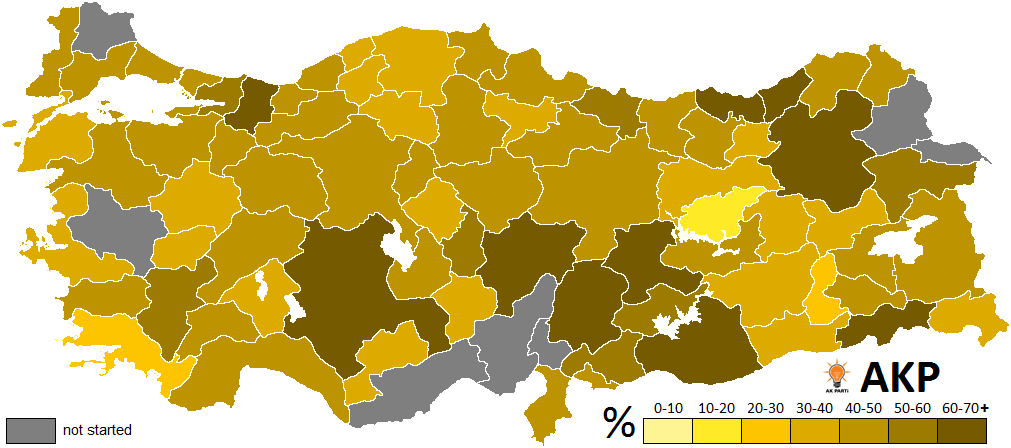
Results obtained by the AK Party by province

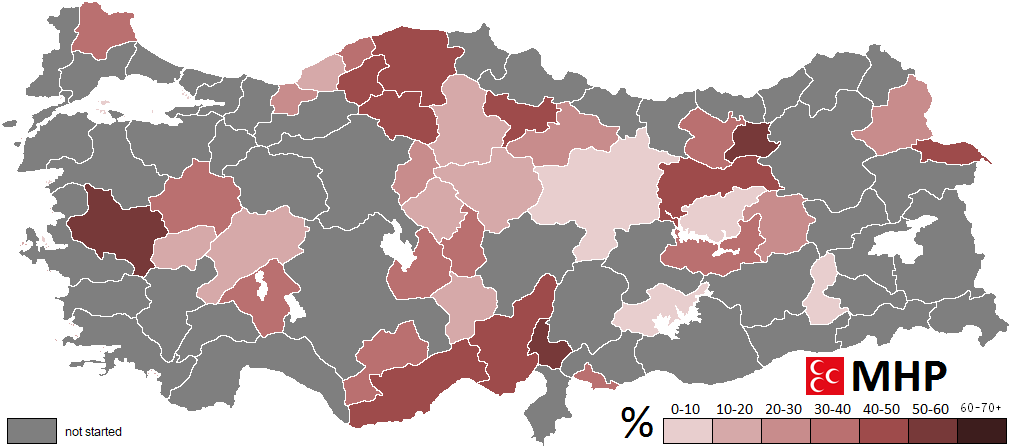
Results obtained by the MHP by province

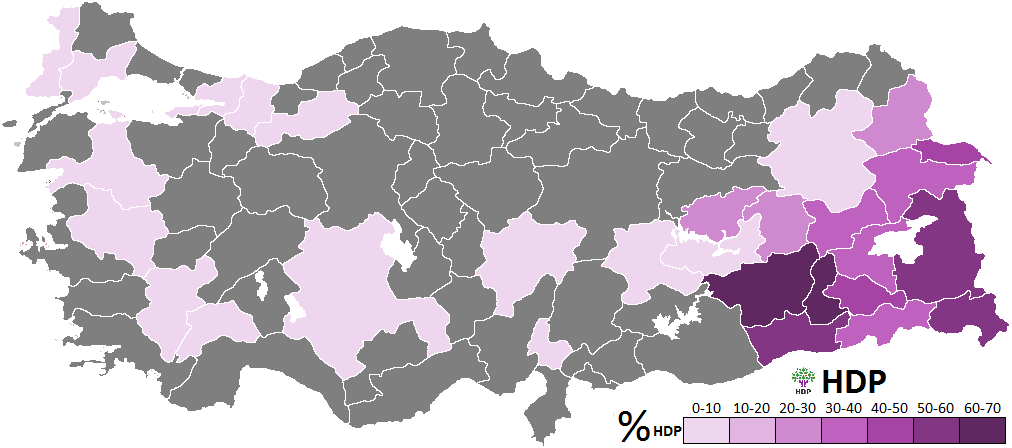
Results obtained by the HDP by province

== Re-runs ==
Where a decisive victor could not be established due to small margins of victory and numerous formal complaints about misconduct, the Supreme Electoral Council (YSK) annulled the elections and ordered re-runs. Elections were annulled in 6 districts and 1 metropolitan municipality (namely Istanbul). Most of the re-runs (namely 4 of the 7 annulled elections) took place on 2 June 2019. Due to the lengthy process behind the controversial decision to annul the Istanbul vote, there was not enough time to schedule the re-run by 2 June, with the YSK deciding instead to hold the fresh election on 23 June.

=== 2 June ===
On 2 June, elections were repeated in the Honaz district of Denizli Province, the Yusufeli district of Artvin Province, the Keskin district of Kırıkkale Province and the town of Kesmetepe, within the district of Besni in Adıyaman Province.

Results of the 2 June 2019 repeat elections
Area	Type	Winner	
Area	Type	31 March	2 June
Honaz (Denizli)	District mayor	CHP	CHP
Yusufeli (Artvin)	District mayor	AK Party	AK Party
Keskin (Kırıkkale)	District mayor	İYİ	AK Party
Kesmetepe (Adıyaman)	Town mayor	Tie*	DSP

* In the 31 March elections in Kesmetepe, the CHP and Democrat Party both won 281 votes and came joint first. The DSP candidate formally complained about misconduct at one ballot box to the YSK and successfully petitioned for the election to be re-run.

=== 23 June ===
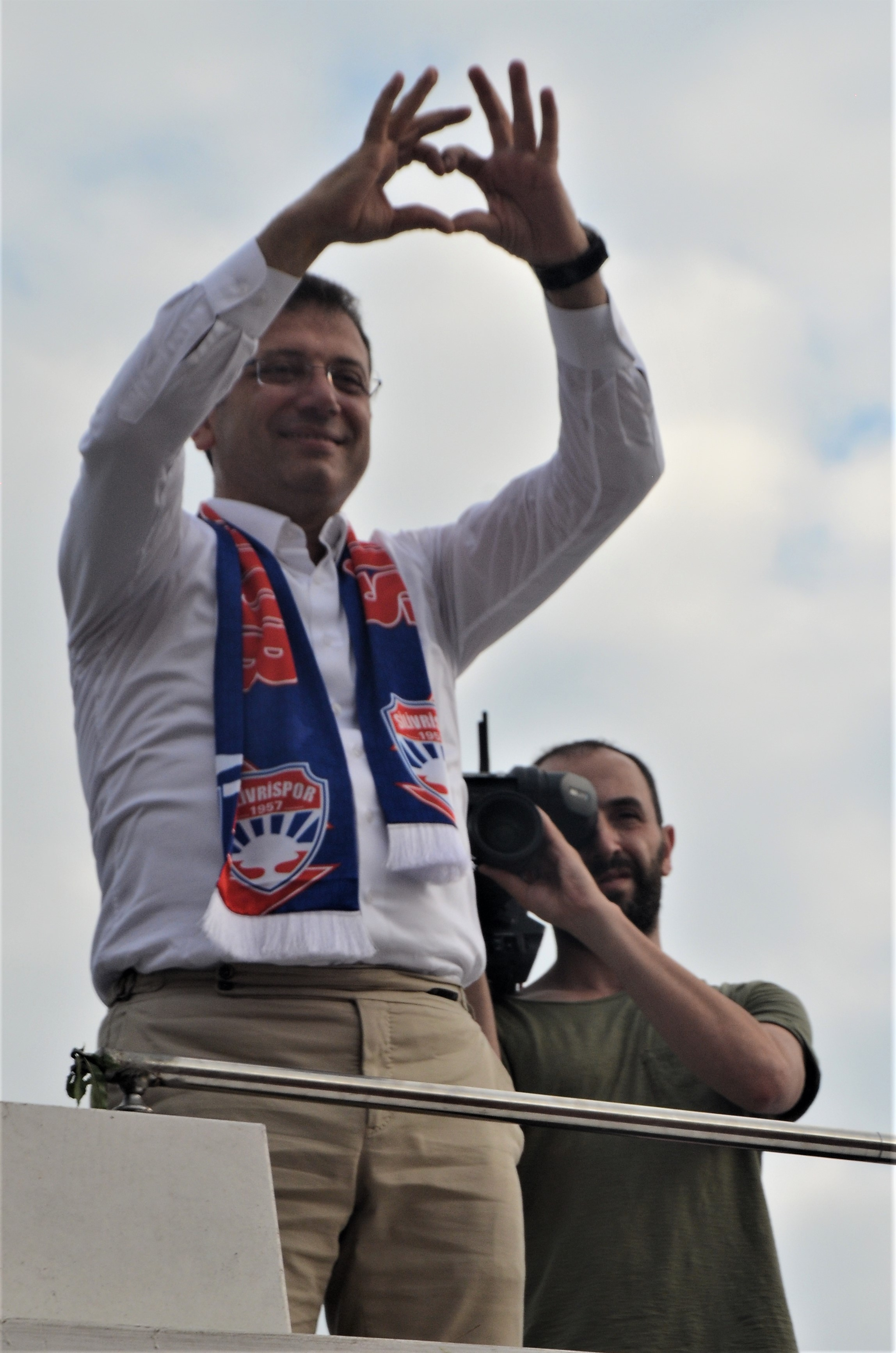
Ekrem İmamoğlu (pictured here with his signature campaign 'love' sign), was re-elected with a landslide in June 2019 re-run, having initially won a narrow 0.1% majority in the 31 March vote

On 23 June, elections were repeated in the Istanbul metropolitan municipality. The results showed a substantial swing in favour of İmamoğlu, who increased his margin of victory to win 54.21% of the vote against Yıldırım's 44.99%.

2019 Turkish local elections: Istanbul (re-run)
Party	Candidate	Votes	%	±%
CHP	Ekrem İmamoğlu	4,741,868	54.2	▲5.4
AK Party	Binali Yıldırım	3,935,453	45.0	▼3.6
SAADET	Necdet Gökçınar	47,829	0.6	▼0.6
Patriotic	Mustafa İlker Yücel	14,545	0.2	▼0.0
Independent	All independents	6,769	0.1	▼0.1
Total valid votes		8,746,464	97.8	-
Rejected ballots		178,599	2.0	-
Turnout		8,925,063	84.4	▲0.5
CHP hold		Swing	▲5.3	
Registered electors		10,570,354		

=== 21 July ===
The town (belde) of Demirci, in the district of Gülağaç in Aksaray Province, held re-run elections on 21 July 2019. The initial election, won by the Great Union Party (BBP) mayoral candidate, was annulled after the YSK cancelled the winning mayor's electoral certificate, leading to the resignation of the entire town council. The re-run election was won by the same candidate, this time running under the AK Party banner.

=== 4 August ===
The town (belde) of Suvarlı, in the district of Besni in Adıyaman Province held re-run elections on 4 August 2019. The election, originally won by the İYİ Party, was annulled after the winning mayor's electoral certificate was cancelled due to a prior conviction that barred the elected mayor from holding office. The re-run election was won by the AK Party candidate, who became the first female mayor in the history of the province.
