= Tunç Soyer =

Turkish politician and Mayor of İzmir

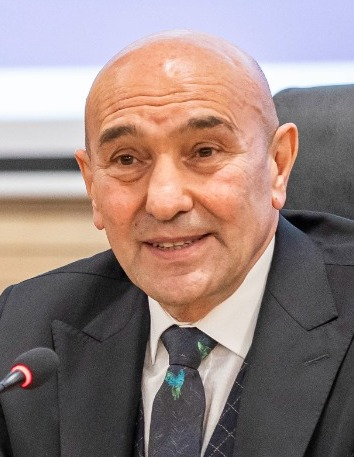

Mayor of İzmir
- In office 8 April 2019 – 5 April 2024
- Preceded by: Aziz Kocaoğlu
- Succeeded by: Cemil Tugay

Mayor of Seferihisar
- In office 29 March 2009 – 31 March 2019
- Preceded by: Hamit Nişancı
- Succeeded by: İsmail Yetişkin

Personal details
- Born: Mustafa Tunç Soyer; 1959 (age 66–67) Ankara, Turkey
- Party: Republican People's Party
- Spouse: Neptün Soyer (m. 1988)
- Children: 2
- Education: Ankara University
- Website: www.tuncsoyer.com.tr

Mustafa Tunç Soyer (born 1959) is a Turkish politician from the Republican People's Party (CHP) who served as the Mayor of İzmir from 2019 to 2024. He previously served as the mayor of Seferihisar, a coastal district of İzmir, from 2009 to 2019.

== Early life and education ==
Soyer was born in Ankara, the capital city of Turkey, in 1959. He graduated from Bornova Anadolu Lisesi, a prestigious high school in Bornova, a district of İzmir in which he received classes in foreign languages particularly in English and French before returning to Ankara to attend Ankara University Faculty of Law. He graduated in 1981. During his education, he was also an actor and assistant theatrical director. He completed two master's degrees, one in Webster University Geneva in the field of international relations and another at Dokuz Eylül University about the European Union.

== Political career ==
In addition to serving as Mayor of Seferihisar and İzmir, Soyer served as an advisor to the former mayor of İzmir, Ahmet Piriştina. He also served as the assistant general secretary and executive member for foreign relations in the İzmir Chamber of Commerce. He was the General Secretary for the EXPO 2015 Steering and Executive Committees.

=== Mayor of Seferihisar ===
Soyer was elected Mayor of Seferihisar, a coastal district of İzmir, in the 2009 local election. He was the candidate of the main opposition center-left Republican People's Party (CHP). He was re-elected for a second term in the 2014 local election.

Soyer drew national attention for his success as Seferihisar mayor, having established the town as a modal tourist destination as part of the slow movement culture. Seferihisar became a member of Cittaslow, the first of its kind in Turkey. Because of his success and popularity in Seferihisar, Soyer was frequently seen as a potential future candidate for Mayor of İzmir.

=== Mayor of İzmir ===
Following the announcement that the serving mayor of İzmir, Aziz Kocaoğlu, would not stand for another term, the CHP began considering new candidates. Despite Kocaoğlu deciding to re-enter the race shortly before the CHP was due to announce its candidate, Soyer was eventually selected, having long been seen as the frontrunner. Soyer was supported by the İYİ Party, with which the CHP formed an electoral alliance named the Nation Alliance.

In the 2019 mayoral election, which was held as part of the 2019 local elections, Soyer was elected with 58.1% of the vote, beating the People's Alliance candidate Nihat Zeybekçi. Zeybekçi, a former Economy Minister, received 38.7% of the vote. Tunç Soyer has organized many fairs under the leadership of İzmir Metropolitan Municipality.

Soyer was not selected as the CHP candidate for the 2024 local elections, with Karşıyaka mayor Cemil Tugay being selected as the CHP candidate instead. Tugay's selection over Soyer has been attributed to the change in leadership within the CHP following former CHP leader Kemal Kılıçdaroğlu's loss in the 2023 Presidential elections and the 38th CHP Ordinary Convention.

=== Arrest ===
On 1 July 2025, Soyer was arrested as part of 120 officials in İzmir Province linked with the CHP on suspicion of corruption.

== Family and personal life ==
Tunç Soyer and Neptün Soyer got married in 1988, when Neptün Soyer was 22 years old. Neptün Soyer, worked in the tourism sector between 1999 and 2002.

=== Nurettin Soyer ===
Soyer's father, Nurettin Soyer, was a prosecutor who took part in opening cases against prominent politicians following the 1980 coup d'état. His prosecutions led to 5 death sentences, 9 life sentences and sentences ranging from 10 months to 36 years for another 221 defendants. Most of those prosecuted were from far-right groups, most notably the Grey Wolves. One defendant who received 5 years in prison was Alparslan Türkeş, the founder and first leader of the Nationalist Movement Party (MHP).

When Tunç Soyer became the CHP's candidate for Mayor of İzmir in 2019, the governing People's Alliance that includes the MHP sharply criticised him for his father's actions against nationalist politicians. However, Nurettin Soyer was also defended for being the only prosecutor ever to bring a case against Fethullah Gülen, the leader of the Gülen Movement, an organisation that is claimed to be a terrorist group by Turkish authorities (under the name 'FETÖ'.)
