= Independent Turkey Party =

Independent Turkey Party Bağımsız Türkiye Partisi
- Abbreviation: BTP
- President: Hüseyin Baş
- Secretary-General: Nuri Kaplan
- Founded: 25 September 2001
- Headquarters: Çankırı Caddesi 24, Ulus, Ankara
- Newspaper: Yeni Mesaj
- Youth wing: BTP Youth
- Women's wing: BTP Kadın Kolları
- Membership (2026): ▲52,525
- Ideology: Kemalism; Turkish nationalism; Conservatism; Economic nationalism; Parliamentarism
- Political position: Center
- Colors: Red; White; Salmon (customary)
- Slogan: İş Aş Haydar Baş (tr: Work, Food, Haydar Baş)
- Grand National Assembly: 0 / 600
- Metropolitan municipalities: 0 / 30
- District municipalities: 0 / 1,351
- Provincial councillors: 0 / 1,251
- Municipal Assemblies: 1 / 20,953

Party flag

Website
- www.btp.org.tr

The Independent Turkey Party (Turkish: Bağımsız Türkiye Partisi, BTP) is a nationalist and Kemalist political party founded on 25 September 2001 by Haydar Baş, who was succeeded by his son Hüseyin Baş after his death in 2020.

In the June 2015 general election, the BTP received 96,465 votes with no parliamentary seats. In the 2023 Presidential election, the BTP decided to support Kemal Kılıçdaroğlu.

== Leaders ==
- 2001 Ata Selçuk
- 2002 Ali Gedik
- 2002–2020 Haydar Baş
- 2020–present Hüseyin Baş

== Election results ==
=== General Elections ===
Election	Votes	Share	Seats	Leader
2002	150,482	0.48%	0 / 550	Haydar Baş
2007	182,095	0.52%	0 / 550	Haydar Baş
2011	did not contest			Haydar Baş
2015 Jun	96,475	0.21	0 / 550	Haydar Baş
2015 Nov	49,297	0.10	0 / 550	Haydar Baş
2018	did not contest			Haydar Baş
2023	did not contest			Hüseyin Baş

=== Local Elections ===
Election	Metropolitan Municipalities		Municipalities		Provincial assembly		Leader
Election	Vote	Chairs	Vote	Chairs	Vote	Chairs	Leader
2004	28,487	0/16	154,519	0/3208	77,193	1/3209	Haydar Baş
2009	51,271	0/16	176,340	3/3274	99,553	5/2931	Haydar Baş
2014	63,567	0/30	96,707	0/1351	35,363	0/1251	Haydar Baş
2019	112,685	0/30	137,887	0/1355	26,950	0/1272	Haydar Baş
2024	177,323	0/30	125,552	0/1363	42,728	0/1282	Hüseyin Baş
