= Opinion polling for the 2019 Turkish local elections =

In the run-up to the 2019 Turkish local elections held on 31 March, various pollsters conducted opinion polls to gauge voting intentions in Turkey's major cities. Additionally, a number of polls were gauged to predict overall vote shares in the local election. This page lists these polls conducted by city, listing the most recent studies first.

== Overall opinion polling ==
The below table shows nationwide opinion polls conducted to gauge overall vote shares.

Date	Pollster	Sample	AKP	CHP	MHP	HDP	İYİ	Others	Lead
31 March 2019	Local elections 2019	–	42.5	29.6	7.2	5.6	7.4	7.7	12.9
26 February 2019	Konsensus	–	40.7	33.6	6.4	4.7	4.1	10.5	7.1
28 Dec 2018 – 3 Jan 2019	OPTIMAR	252	45.5	28.6	7.6	7.6	7.7	3.1	16.9
7–13 Oct 2018	ORC	5,186	40.3	29.7	19.5	6.3	2.9	1.1	10.6
11 July 2016	AKAM	8,890	40.6	32.3	11.7	11.6	—	3.8	8.3
30 March 2014	Local elections 2014	43,543,717	42.9	26.3	17.8	6.3	—	6.8	16.5

== By province ==
=== Istanbul ===
Date	Pollster	Sample size	Yıldırım	İmamoğlu	Others	Undecided	Lead
31 Mar 2019	2019 election (annulled)	–	48.6	48.8	2.6	–	0.2
20-29 Mar 2019	PİAR	11,445	48.5	48.7			0.2
19 Mar 2019	Optimar	6,022	49.7	48.8	–	–	0.9
10–18 Mar 2019	ADA	16,500	48.4	49.2	2.4	–	0.8
18 March 2019	Themis	2,161	48.3	49.3	2.4	-	1.0
16–17 Mar 2019	Gezici	–	49.3	48.6	2.1	–	0.7
8 March 2019	Avrasya	2,440	48.5	50.1	1.4	–	1.6
26 Feb-4 Mar 2019	ORC	8,160	50.9	46.6	2.5	–	4.3
23–24 Feb 2019	Gezici	–	52.1	46.6	1.3	–	5.5
9–15 Feb 2019	PollMark	5,024	36.0	37.8	–	26.2	1.8
28 Jan-2 Feb 2019	ORC	5,950	43.6	39.7	2.8	13.9	3.9
28 Jan-2 Feb 2019	Optimar	3,012	45.9	41.6	-	12.5	4.3
16 January 2019	Avrasya	-	44.0	42.0	-	14.0	2.0
19–22 Dec 2018	PIAR	3,120	36.5	33.0	-	30.5	3.5
Alliance			People's AKP + MHP	Nation CHP + İYİ	None	N/A	N/A
Incumbent			Mevlüt Uysal AKP				

=== Ankara ===
Date	Pollster	Sample size	Özhaseki	Yavaş	Others	Undecided	Lead
31 Mar 2019	2019 election	–	47.1	50.9	2.0	–	3.8
16–17 Mar 2019	Gezici	-	47.7	49.8	2.5	–	2.1
8 March 2019	PIAR	–	44.6	54.1	1.3	–	9.5
8 March 2019	Avrasya	1,940	45.6	51.6	2.8	–	5.0
23–24 Feb 2019	Gezici	–	51.8	46.3	1.9	–	5.5
8–24 Feb 2019	AREA	–	45.5	51.2	3.3	–	5.7
10–16 Feb 2019	PollMark	5,040	32.0	42.1	–	25.9	10.1
31 Jan-2 Feb 2019	PIAR	–	35.8	41.7	–	22.5	5.9
17–31 Jan 2019	ORC	–	36.8	41.9	2.3	19.0	5.1
26–27 Jan 2019	Gezici	–	52.2	47.8	–	–	4.4
19–28 Sep 2018	SAROS	1,620	44.3	54.1	1.6	–	9.8
Alliance			People's AKP + MHP	Nation CHP + İYİ	None	N/A	N/A
Incumbent			Mustafa Tuna AKP				

=== Adana ===
Date	Pollster	Sample size	Sözlü	Karalar	Others	Undecided	Lead
31 Mar 2019	2019 election	–	42.8	53.6	3.6	–	10.8
16–17 Mar 2019	Gezici	–	54.1	45.4	0.5	–	8.7
8 March 2019	Avrasya	1,510	47.0	51.5	1.5	–	4.5
4 March 2019	Avrasya	–	46.1	51.9	2.0	–	5.8
23–24 Feb 2019	Gezici	–	56.1	43.2	0.7	–	12.9
10–17 Feb 2019	Avrasya	–	37.4	40.6	–	22.0	3.2
26–27 Jan 2019	Gezici	–	57.7	42.3	–	–	15.4
Alliance			People's MHP + AKP	Nation CHP + İYİ	None	N/A	N/A
Incumbent			Hüseyin Sözlü MHP				

=== Bursa ===
Date	Pollster	Sample size	Aktaş	Bozbey	Others	Undecided	Lead
31 Mar 2019	2019 election	–	49.8	47.0	3.2	–	2.8
16–17 Mar 2019	Gezici	-	46.6	52.9	0.5	–	6.3
8–12 Mar 2019	Metropoll	3,122	45.1	52.4	2.6	–	7.3
8 March 2019	Avrasya	1,440	49.8	49.0	1.2	–	0.8
23–24 Feb 2019	Gezici	–	46.8	52.7	0.5	–	5.9
17–31 Jan 2019	ORC	–	35.2	36.5	2.8	25.5	1.3
26–27 Jan 2019	Gezici	–	51.2	48.8	–	–	2.4
Alliance			People's AKP + MHP	Nation CHP + İYİ	None	N/A	N/A
Incumbent			Alinur Aktaş AKP				

=== Eskişehir ===
Date	Pollster	Sample size	Sakallı	Büyükerşen	Others	Undecided	Lead
31 Mar 2019	2019 election	–	45.1	52.3	2.6	–	7.2
28 March 2019	ORC	–	48.5	49.2	2.3	–	1.1
8 March 2019	PIAR	–	41.0	57.2	1.8	–	16.2
2–4 Mar 2019	ORC	1,425	48.5	49.6	1.9	–	1.1
17–31 Jan 2019	ORC	–	40.2	39.8	1.6	18.4	0.4
Alliance			People's AKP + MHP	Nation CHP + İYİ	None	N/A	N/A
Incumbent			Yılmaz Büyükerşen CHP				

=== Antalya ===
Date	Pollster	Sample size	Türel	Böcek	Others	Undecided	Lead
31 Mar 2019	2019 election	–	46.3	50.6	3.1	–	4.3
8 March 2019	Avrasya	1,560	44.4	54.3	1.3	–	9.9
4 March 2019	PIAR	–	44.5	53.1	2.4	–	8.6
2–4 Mar 2019	ORC	2,596	48.9	46.7	1.9	–	1.1
23–24 Feb 2019	Gezici	–	52.2	47.1	0.7	–	5.1
17–31 Jan 2019	ORC	–	38.7	40.5	2.4	18.4	1.8
Alliance			People's AKP + MHP	Nation CHP + İYİ	None	N/A	N/A
Incumbent			Menderes Türel AKP				

=== Hatay ===
Date	Pollster	Sample size	Güler	Savaş	Others	Undecided	Lead
31 Mar 2019	2019 election	–	42.8	55.2	2.0	–	12.4
16–17 Mar 2019	Gezici	–	51.1	47.8	1.1	–	3.3
8 March 2019	Avrasya	1,060	42.0	56.1	1.9	–	14.1
4 March 2019	PIAR	–	42.1	56.0	1.9	–	13.9
3–4 Mar 2019	EMAX	1,650	43.7	40.8	0.9	14.6	2.9
23–24 Feb 2019	Gezici	–	55.8	43.3	0.9	–	12.5
Alliance			People's AKP + MHP	Nation CHP + İYİ	None	N/A	N/A
Incumbent			Lütfü Savaş CHP				

=== Balıkesir ===
Date	Pollster	Sample size	Yılmaz	Ok	Others	Undecided	Lead
31 Mar 2019	2019 election	–	47.8	46.5	5.7	–	1.3
16–17 Mar 2019	Gezici	–	53.1	45.8	1.1	–	7.3
23–24 Feb 2019	Gezici	–	55.8	42.4	1.8	–	13.4
17–21 Jan 2019	ORC	1,420	48.5	46.6	4.9	–	1.9
Alliance			People's AKP + MHP	Nation İYİ + CHP	None	N/A	N/A
Incumbent			Zekai Kafaoğlu AKP				

=== Denizli ===
Date	Pollster	Sample size	Zolan	Bahtiyar	Others	Undecided	Lead
31 Mar 2019	2019 election	–	50.6	43.9	5.5	–	6.7
14–20 Mar 2019	PIAR	7,022	47.1	49.1	3.8	–	2.0
8 March 2019	Avrasya	1,060	48.0	49.7	2.3	–	1.7
12–13 Feb 2019	ORC	1,524	39.4	41.3	2.1	17.2	1.9
17–31 Jan 2019	ORC	–	38.7	37.0	1.8	22.5	1.7
Alliance			People's AKP + MHP	Nation İYİ + CHP	None	N/A	N/A
Incumbent			Osman Zolan AKP				

=== Şanlıurfa ===
Date	Pollster	Sample size	Beyazgül	Cevheri	Others	Undecided	Lead
31 Mar 2019	2019 election	–	60.8	36.4	2.8	–	24.4
1–6 Mar 2019	PIAR	8,260	49.0	50.8	0.2	–	1.8
2–3 Mar 2019	EMAX	1,481	45.2	37.6	0.8	16.4	7.6
Alliance			People's AKP + MHP	None SP	None	N/A	N/A
Incumbent			Nihat Çiftçi AKP				
