= June 2019 Istanbul mayoral election =

Turkish municipal election

- 23 June 2019
- Opinion polls
- Turnout: 84.51% (▲0.57 pp)
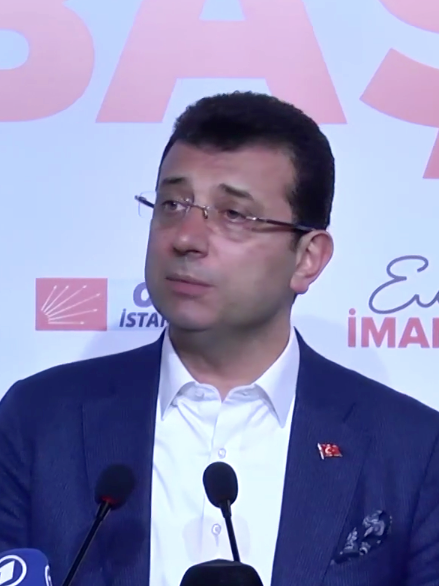

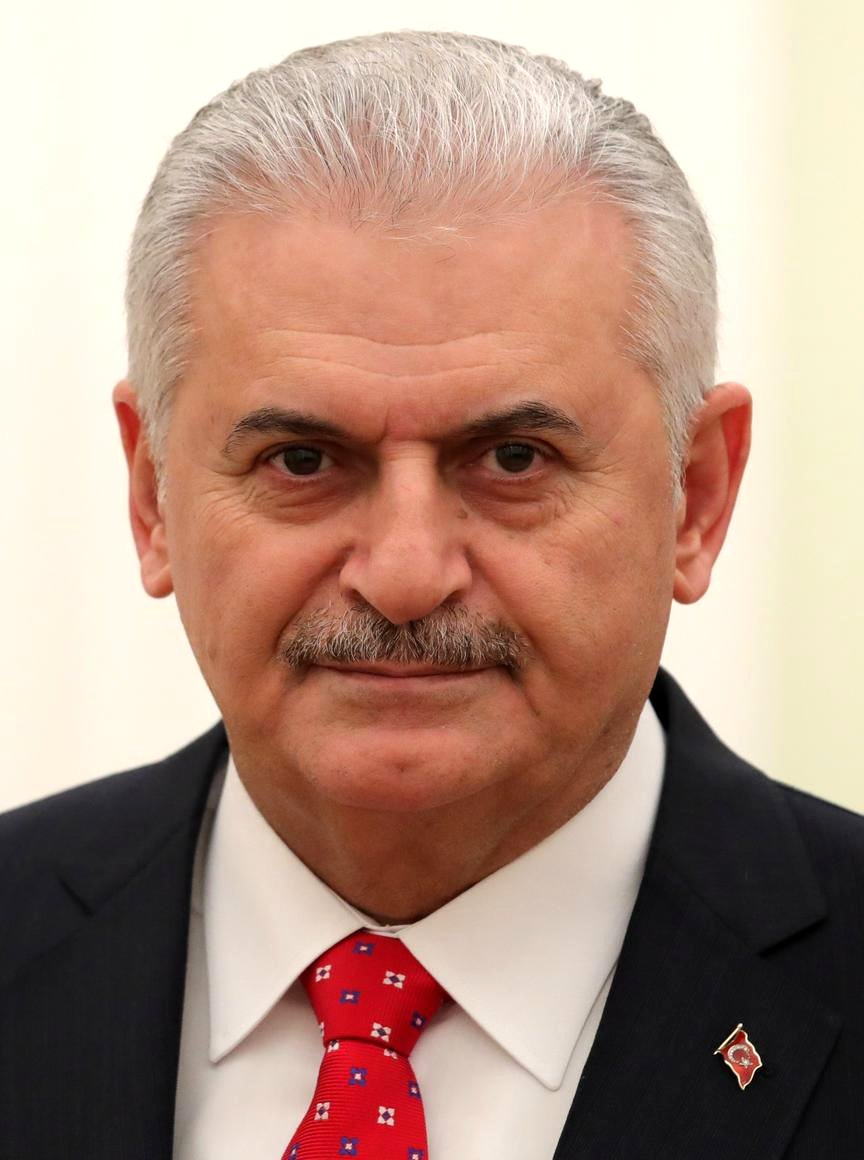
	First party	Second party
Candidate	Ekrem İmamoğlu	Binali Yıldırım
Party	CHP	AK Party
Alliance	Nation	People
Popular vote	4,742,082	3,936,068
Percentage	54.22%	45.00%
Swing	▲5.45%	▼3.61%
- Neighbourhood results İmamoğlu: 40-50% 50-60% 60-70% 70-80% 80-90% Yıldırım: 50-60% 60-70%
Mayor before election
Ali Yerlikaya (acting)
Independent
Elected Mayor
Ekrem İmamoğlu
CHP

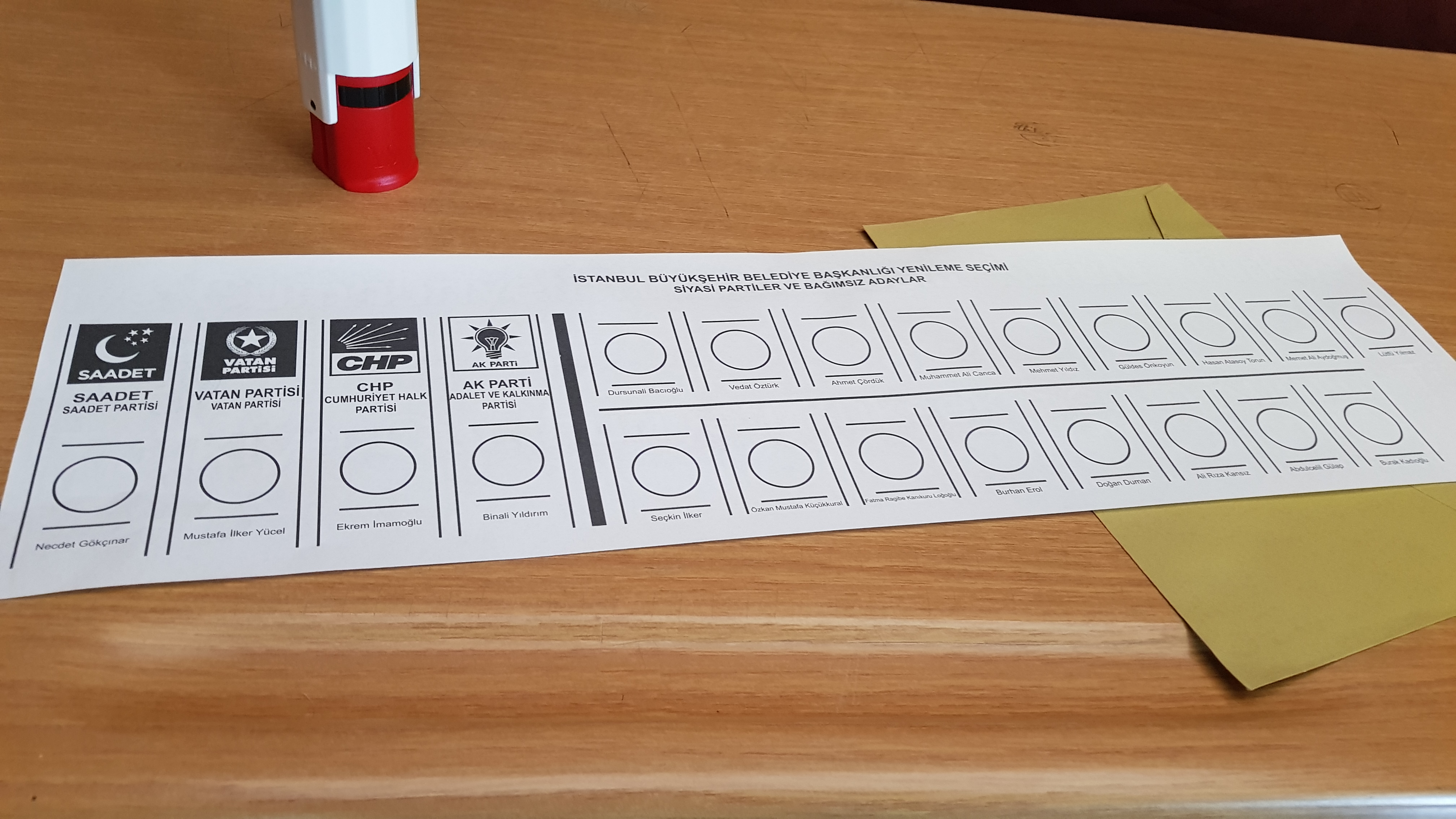
June 2019 Istanbul mayoral election ballot

The June 2019 Istanbul mayoral election was held on 23 June 2019. It was a repeat of the March 2019 mayoral election, which was annulled by the Supreme Electoral Council (YSK) on 6 May 2019. The original election had resulted in a narrow 0.2% margin of victory for opposition candidate Ekrem İmamoğlu, causing the governing Justice and Development Party (AK Party) to successfully petition for a by-election.

The Nation Alliance (formed of the Republican People's Party (CHP) and the Good Party) fielded their initial candidate Ekrem İmamoğlu, who ran a positive campaign under the slogan Her Şey Çok Güzel Olacak (Everything will be fine). The governing People's Alliance (formed by the AK Party and the Nationalist Movement Party) reselected their initially unsuccessful candidate Binali Yıldırım. The non-aligned Peoples' Democratic Party (HDP) did not stand their own candidate and announced their support for İmamoğlu. The election featured a televised debate between the two main candidates, for the first time in Turkey since 2002. Campaigning focused highly on rival accusations of misconduct during and after the initial March 2019 election, during which both sides alleged that they had been a victim of the other's antics.

The results showed a substantial swing in favour of İmamoğlu, who multiplied his initial 13,700-vote margin of victory 57-fold to win 54.2% of the vote against Yıldırım's 45.0%. The opposition's victory defied opinion polls, which predicted a much narrower victory, and was a record in the history of Istanbul local elections in terms of both popular vote and percentage share. İmamoğlu also won pluralities in 28 of Istanbul's 39 districts. Yıldırım, on the other hand, lost 11 districts he had won in March and saw a 4% decrease in his previous vote share, conceding defeat soon after indicative results became public. The result was seen as a huge defeat to President Recep Tayyip Erdoğan, who had once said that if his party "lost Istanbul, we would lose Turkey." Commentators viewed the result as a backlash against Erdoğan, the initial annulment of the March vote (which was largely seen as an anti-democratic manoeuvre), economic mismanagement and negative campaigning. It was also seen as a backfire against the government's last-ditch attempt to involve the outlawed Kurdistan Workers' Party (PKK)'s imprisoned leader Abdullah Öcalan in the process, in an attempt to convince HDP voters to boycott the election.

The opposition's landslide was characterised at the time as the "beginning of the end" for Erdoğan, with international commentators calling the re-run a huge government miscalculation that led to a potential İmamoğlu candidacy in the next scheduled presidential election. It was suggested that the scale of the government's defeat could provoke a Cabinet reshuffle and an early general election, though this did not come to pass. İmamoğlu would end up not being chosen as the opposition's presidential candidate in 2023, and Erdoğan would end up being narrowly re-elected, defeating Kemal Kılıçdaroğlu.

== 31 March 2019 election ==
=== Election results ===
After the local elections were held on 31 March 2019, the Chairman of the Supreme Electoral Council (YSK), Sadi Güven, announced that Ekrem İmamoğlu received 4,159,650 votes and that he was ahead of Justice and Development Party's (AK Party) Istanbul mayoral candidate Binali Yıldırım. The Istanbul Provincial Organization of the AKP demanded a re-count of invalid votes and the correction of ballot records on 2 April, which was approved by the Supreme Electoral Council. At the conclusion of the re-counting process on 17 April 2019, it was announced that Ekrem İmamoğlu had completed the election with 4,169,765 votes, 13,729 votes ahead of his rival Binali Yıldırım, who received 4,156,036 votes. On the same day, İmamoğlu began his term by receiving his certificate of election from the Supreme Electoral Council's İstanbul Provincial Electoral Council.

=== Objection process ===
- 31 March 2019: 2019 Turkish local elections are held.
- 2 April 2019: Recounts are ordered in 9 districts of Istanbul as a result of the AK Party's objections.
- 7 April 2019: The AK Party's demand for re-counts in all 38 districts of Istanbul is denied by the YSK.
- 9 April 2019: The Nationalist Movement Party (MHP) applied to the YSK for the annulment of results in the Maltepe district of Istanbul.
- 17 April 2019: The Istanbul Provincial Election Board delivered Ekrem İmamoğlu's certificate of election. The AK Party objected to this by giving the YSK a 44-page report and three suitcases of documents.
- 20 April 2019: The AK Party made an additional objection regarding people removed with KHKs. This was rejected.
- 6 May 2019: The YSK decided that the Istanbul mayoral election shall be annulled and repeated on 23 June 2019.
- 8 May 2019: The Republican People's Party (CHP) and the Good Party applied to the YSK for the annulment of all elections in Istanbul, in addition to the mayoral election.
- 13 May 2019: The YSK rejected the CHP's and Good Party's application for the annulment of all elections in Istanbul.
- 22 May 2019: The YSK published the detailed ruling regarding the annulment of the Istanbul mayoral election.

=== Annulment of the election ===
On 6 May 2019, in a 7-to-4 decision, the YSK ruled that the Istanbul mayoral election shall be annulled, and that it shall be repeated on 23 June 2019. This decision was based on the objections raised by the AK Party regarding the fact that despite the law, some balloting committee presidents and members were not public officials. Despite the decision, the President of the YSK Sadi Güven was one of the four members who voted against annulment. He later publicly stated that he was not in favour of renewing the election.

== Electoral schedule ==
The Supreme Electoral Council determined the electoral schedule based on its decision on 6 May 2019 to annul the original election and repeat it on 23 June 2019:

- 15 May 2019: The deadline for the submittal of a list of all public servants that will serve in each district to the relevant district election committee centers.
- 20 May 2019: The determination, based on a lottery, of the balloting committee presidents and members, from among the submitted list of public servants.
- 21 May 2019: The distribution of the list of the balloting committee presidents and members to political parties, if requested.
- 23–24 May 2019: The deadline for the submittal of possible objections regarding the make-up of the balloting committees.
- 24 May 2019: The deadline for the period in which political parties can change to their candidates.
- 25 May 2019: The deadline for decisions to be made by the district electoral councils regarding the objections to the make-up of the balloting committees.
- 26 May 2019: The deadline for objections regarding the decisions made by the district electoral councils to be submitted to the Istanbul Provincial Electoral Council.
- 27 May 2019: The announcement of the finalized candidate lists, the printing of the unified ballots and their distribution to the district electoral councils, and the beginning of distribution of the voter information documents.
- 29 May 2019: The completion of the establishment of the balloting committees.
- 13 June 2019: The beginning of election propaganda and of certain prohibitions.
- 16 June 2019: The deadline for the completion of distribution of the voter information documents.
- 18 June 2019: The annotation of information regarding restricted voters to the voter lists.
- 19 June 2019: The completion of the replication of the ballot box voter lists.
- 22 June 2019: The ending of election propaganda at 18:00.
- 23 June 2019: The beginning of the voting process at 8:00, and its completion at 17:00.

== Electoral conduct ==
The Supreme Electoral Council announced that the electoral roll would be exactly the same as the electors in the March 2019. Since the vote was a re-run, voters who turned 18 between 31 March and 23 June 2019 would not be included on the electoral roll. The YSK did, however, remove individuals with mental disabilities from voter lists. This was due to numerous complaints from all parties in the March local elections that mentally impaired individuals unable to exercise free thought were exploited for their vote. As a result, the Istanbul electorate fell from 10,570,939 to 10,570,354 (including deaths and convictions during this time).

== Election campaign and party stances ==
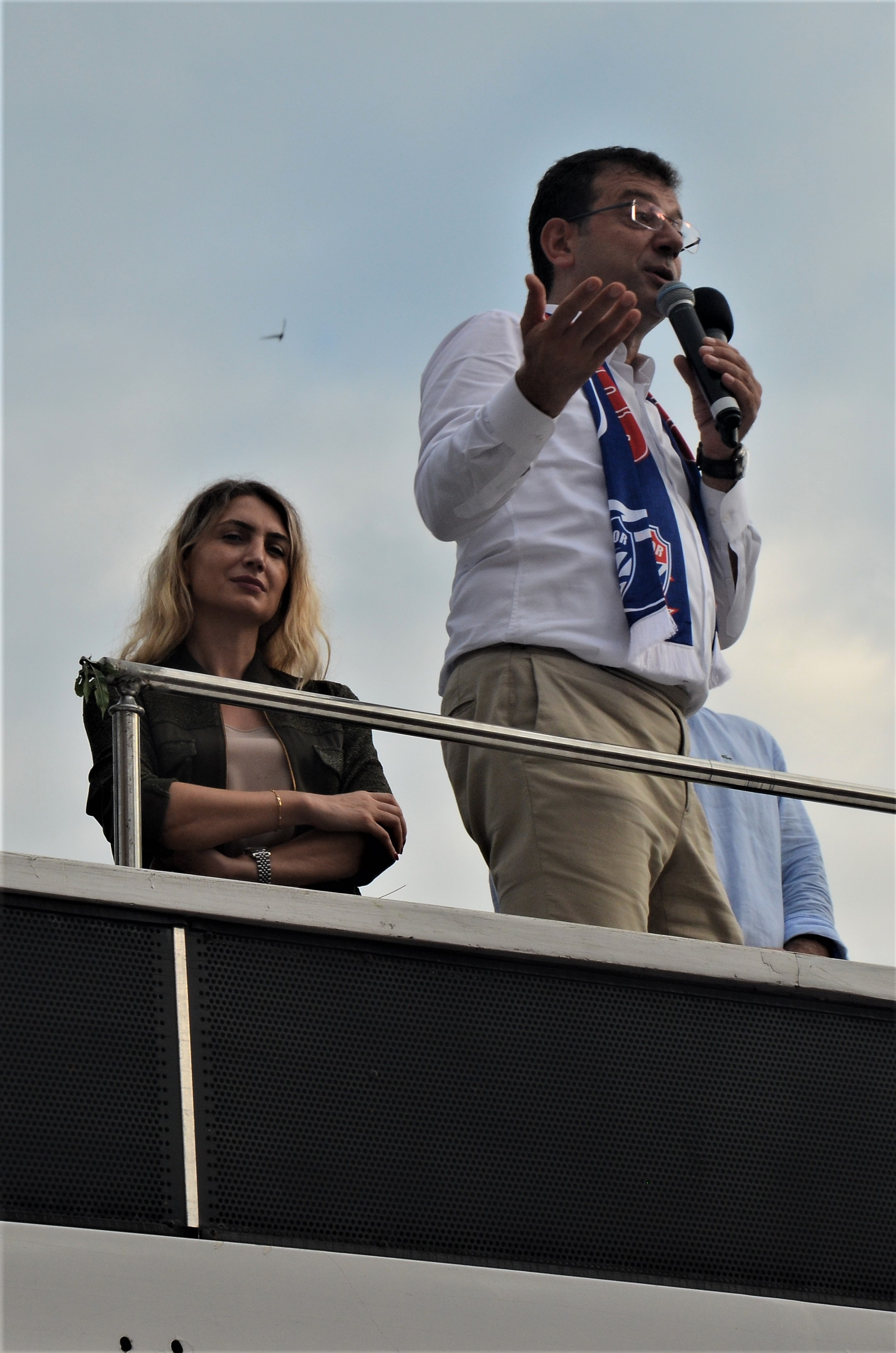
Ekrem İmamoğlu and his spouse Dilek İmamoğlu campaigning in Silivri.

=== Candidates ===
The nominee of the governing Justice and Development Party (AK Party) was Binali Yıldırım, a former Prime Minister of Turkey and an incumbent Member of the Grand National Assembly. As part of the People's Alliance, the AK Party's candidate had the support of the Nationalist Movement Party (MHP). Ekrem İmamoğlu was the candidate of the Republican People's Party (CHP), and was supported by the CHP-allied Good Party, which is a part of the Nation Alliance.

After the annulment of the 31 March elections, the Democratic Left Party (DSP) candidate Muammer Aydın, the Independent Turkey Party (BTP) candidate Selim Kotil, the Democratic Party candidate Ersan Gökgöz, the Turkish Communist Party candidate Zehra Güner Karaoğlu, the Worker's Movement Party-supported independent candidate Özge Akman, the Turkish Communist Movement-supported independent candidate Aysel Tekerek, and the independent candidate Hazer Oruç Kaya all announced that they would not stand in the upcoming election.

The Felicity Party (Saadet Party) candidate Necdet Gökçınar, the Patriotic Party (Vatan Party) candidate Mustafa İlker Yücel, and the independent candidates Doğan Duman and Muhammet Ali Canca, conversely announced that they would participate in the Istanbul mayoral election that would be repeated on 23 June 2019.

On 27 May 2019, the finalized candidate list for the 23 June 2019 election was announced. In the list announced by the Istanbul Provincial Electoral Council, there are 17 independent candidates aside from the partied candidates Ekrem İmamoğlu, Binali Yıldırım, Necdet Gökçınar, and Mustafa İlker Yücel.

=== Justice and Development Party ===
In the articles published on 9 May 2019 regarding the AK Party's strategy, it was said that the AK Party would go door-to-door to convince undecided voters and those who did not vote on 31 March, that the AK Party would soften its rhetoric, that projects regarding Istanbul and its districts would be emphasized, and that the AK Party would participate in joint rallies with the MHP. Aside from these efforts, president and AK Party leader Recep Tayyip Erdoğan would join iftar dinners throughout Ramadan, make house visits to voters, and hold rallies in each of the 39 districts of Istanbul. An election coordination center was created under the scope of these strategies, and Mehmet Özhaseki, AK Party's candidate for Ankara mayor on 31 March 2019 was chosen to lead this operation.

As part of their election campaign, AK Party's goals were:

- To explain the reasons for the annulment of the election to the voters in a convincing manner.
- To call all 2,300,000 AK Party members who are eligible to vote in Istanbul by telephone, and to remind them that they absolutely need to vote.
- To not use the name of the Nation Alliance candidate Ekrem İmamoğlu, but to refer to him only as "CHP's candidate".
- To campaign in order to reduce the image of victimhood held by the CHP due to the annulment of the election.
- To end the rhetoric that was used in the 31 March elections that the election would affect the survival of the government. The campaign focused on the rhetoric of stability and prosperity.
- To direct the 103,000 voters who voted for the Saadet Party on 31 March towards the AKP.

==== Campaign towards resentful AK Party voters ====
A different rhetoric was used towards the estimated 400,000 to 700,000 AK Party voters who did not vote for Binali Yıldırım on 31 March as a reaction against the party's policies. In this context, the statements by government spokesperson Mahir Ünal's and AK Party group deputy chairman Numan Kurtulmuş's statements drew special attention.

==== Campaign towards Kurdish voters ====
During the campaign for the election on 31 March, the AK Party along with its partner MHP emphasized the "survival problem" in its rhetoric. Afterwards, the AK Party determined that many conservative Kurds who had previously voted for the AK Party had not voted on 31 March, due to the fact that the rhetoric associating Kurds with terrorism during the campaign had been highly successful. Accordingly, the AK Party decided to proceed with a separate effort for the roughly 230,000 conservative Kurds who did not vote on 31 March. AK Party decided to campaign by messaging that they would "fix their mistakes" to people such as opinion leaders, business people, NGOs in the southeastern provinces as well as in Istanbul. Through this, the AK Party planned to communicate directly with the Kurdish voters. On the other hand, the AK Party appealed to the MHP, which supports Binali Yıldırım in the election, not to campaign in Istanbul.

On 6 May 2019, the lawyers of imprisoned PKK leader Abdullah Öcalan were allowed to visit Öcalan in an unprecedented move. This was followed by the lifting of the ban on the visitation of Öcalan by Justice Minister Abdülhamit Gül. These actions, combined with a shift in rhetoric on Öcalan by the Anadolu Agency from pre-31 March "head terrorist" to simply "İmralı", the referral of Öcalan as "estimable Öcalan" by Presidential Security and Foreign Policy Council member Burhanettin Duran, as well as Öcalan's request for an end to the hunger strikes started for the betterment of his imprisonment conditions on 26 May all caused speculation of cooperation between the AK Party and Öcalan. On the other hand, speculation was also made that the purpose of the meetings with Öcalan was to cause a drop in İmamoğlu's votes by either having the HDP name a candidate for mayor, or by having the HDP boycott the election. Conversely, MHP leader Bahçeli said, in regards to Öcalan's visitation by his lawyers, that "If you ask me, he should meet with his lawyer". On 9 May, İmam Taşçıer offered Kurdish support for the AK Party candidate in exchange of the release of the Kurds who were imprisoned unjustly, recognizing the legitimate Kurdish rights in Turkey and the establishment of good relations with the Syrian Kurds, contrary, Kurds might throw their support behind the CHP.

Binali Yıldırım visited Diyarbakır on 6 June in order to gain the support of Kurdish voters in Istanbul. There, he welcomed those who came to listen to him using Kurdish words, claimed that there were "members of parliament from Kurdistan in the inaugural Grand National Assembly of Turkey, and pronounced the name of the PKK differently than the way that it is commonly pronounced, all of which drew a reaction. These actions by Yıldırım in Diyarbakır were criticised by Good Party leader Meral Akşener as "first calling Kurds terrorists, and then going to Diyarbakır and crying to get their votes in Istanbul", and by MHP leader Devlet Bahçeli as "there is no Kurdistan or Lazistan in Turkey. Neither will there be in the future. If there are who wish that there would be, they will always find the Nationalist-Idealist movement". Bahçeli's statement was ignored by media organizations close to the AK Party. Co-leader of the HDP Sezai Temelli also criticized the hypocrisy of Yıldırım's actions.

On 22 June 2019, the recently inaugurated President of the Kurdistan Region Nechirvan Barzani visited Istanbul and met with Turkish President Tayyip Erdoğan, who described Barzani as his "special guest". It was Barzani's first official foreign visit as the President of the KRI. The goal of the visit has been interpreted by several media outlets, including Voice of America, as to gain Kurdish support for the ruling Justice and Development Party's candidate Binali Yıldırım in the upcoming 23 June 2019 Istanbul mayoral election.

==== "Because they stole" statement ====
After the annulment of the 31 March elections, Binali Yıldırım gave the response "very simple, because they stole" to a citizen who asked about the annulment. Following this, the Justice and Development Party (AK Party) began to regularly allege that the Republican People's Party (CHP) had stolen votes. As part of this, President Erdoğan claimed that there existed footage proving that the CHP had committed vote theft, but this footage never surfaced. However, despite this, Erdoğan continued to raise this allegation.

On the other hand, in regards to the accusation that the CHP stole votes, Yıldırım alleged that balloting council presidents had not given the relevant ballots to those that they identified as AK Party voters in the 31 March elections. Meanwhile, Minister of the Interior Süleyman Soylu claimed that the votes were stolen after the tabulation of the votes.

After the absence of vote theft in the reasoning for the annulment of the election by the Supreme Electoral Council (YSK), the AK Party's allegations were criticized by the CHP. In light of this, Yıldırım claimed that he "had to say that they stole", due to the reasoning that he could not make his voice heard during the campaign.

==== Criticisms towards rivals ====
Members of the AK Party made certain accusations during the campaign towards Ekrem İmamoğlu and the CHP:

- President Erdoğan said that "this is Istanbul, this is not Constantinople, there are some that want to see it as such. We have 22 days against those that want to see it as such".
- Regarding the election, AK Party general vice president Mehmet Özhaseki said that "[their] side is on the side of the nation, of the government, of people and of service. If you look to the other side, you will see FETÖ's scoundrels and PKK's murderers".
- AK Party's Erzurum member of parliament İbrahim Aydemir said that should Ekrem İmamoğlu win the election, that "the non-believers' idols will be erected" in Istanbul.
- AK Party's Erzurum member of parliament Selami Altınok said that should Ekrem İmamoğlu win the election, that İSPARK would be given to the HDP.
- AK Party's Istanbul member of parliament Ahmet Hamdi Çamlı compared voters who voted for İmamoğlu to the "sick".
- Former Ankara mayor Melih Gökçek said regarding İmamoğlu that "the Conqueror's grandchildren will not allow the Byzantines' grandchildren".

==== Intra-party objections ====
During the annulment process, there were criticisms of the Justice and Development Party (AK Party) from party members and from those who were ideologically close to the party. Former AK Party prime minister Ahmet Davutoğlu criticised the decision to annul, saying that "the YSK's decision to annul has caused an erosion to our most basic principles". Following this, referring to the implication made by a television program that he is a traitor, Davutoğlu responded that "the day will come when we will find out who protected the inheritance, and who betrayed it". Later, Davutoğlu said that "everything can be lost, and then won again. Power can be lost and then won again. There is no tomorrow for those who lose hope. Don't be afraid to talk".

Meanwhile, other members of the AK Party brought certain criticisms towards the annulment and the campaign run by the AK Party:

- AK Party Istanbul member of parliament Mustafa Yeneroğlu said that the government needs to listen to the criticisms from the public, and that steps should be taken to ensure that a pluralistic democracy and a liberal constitutional state can grow.
- Former AK Party member of parliament Mehmet Ocaktan claimed that the AK Party's representative in the YSK is a member of FETÖ.
- AK Party Ardahan member of parliament Orhan Atalay characterized the Tarawih prayers organised by the Muftiate of Istanbul for the anniversary of the Conquest of Istanbul, which President Erdoğan joined, as being "palace style".
- The interview given by AK Party general vice president Azmi Ekinci wherein Ekinci criticised the party's strategy in the 31 March elections was removed.

In response to these developments, President Erdoğan said that "as the Turkish nation gives one of the most critical struggles in its history, we will not give permission to those who want to implement their own agendas at the cost of our party's weakness". In addition to this, the decision to assign duties to those who have not been recently active but who are known in the AK Party, such as Abdülkadir Aksu, Sadık Yakut, Mevlüt Uysal, Faruk Çelik, and Bülent Arınç was seen as measures to stop the intra-party opposition.

=== Republican People's Party ===
İmamoğlu, who won the elections held on 31 March, but whose certificate of election was cancelled by the annulment of the election, declared that they wouldn't boycott the election and that they would compete immediately after the decision to annul. After this declaration, İmamoğlu met with voters in a different district of Istanbul every day, joined iftars, and made speeches.

As part of the election campaign, the Republican People's Party planned the following strategy:

- It was announced that İmamoğlu's victimhood would be emphasized, that even the candidates who lost would be active, that large rallies would not be held, and that house visits would be made.
- A news bureau would be established as an alternative to the Anadolu Agency in the 23 June elections, and that the results would be published live as the counts are completed.
- İmamoğlu indicated that he would continue to use the title "Mayor of Istanbul".
- A donation campaign was established to fund the election campaign. While the donations made in the first day reached ₺5,000,000, the donations made in one week reached over ₺10,000,000 from 500,000 donors, of which 340,000 were from domestic donors. As of 26 May, the total amount of donations made to the campaign exceeded ₺15,000,000.
- It was decided that only five people (Ekrem İmamoğlu, CHP İstanbul Provincial President Canan Kaftancıoğlu, and CHP General Vice Presidents Oğuz Kaan Salıcı, Seyit Torun, and Onursal Adıgüzel) would be assigned to electoral coordination.
- While a group of members of parliament would be working in the Grand National Assembly (TBMM), other members of parliament were assigned to Istanbul.
- It was decided that there would be a campaign to get the 1,700,000 people who did not vote on 31 March to vote. As part of this, a "bring your neighbor who didn't vote on 31 March to the ballot box" campaign was established.
- It was announced that slogans other than "Her şey çok güzel olacak" (Everything will be fine) would be used in the campaign.

== Opinion polling ==
Date(s)	Pollster	Sample size	AKP	CHP	Other	Undecided	Not Voting
18–20 June	PİAR	1,620	47.6	51.5	0.9	–	–
17–20 June	Avrasya	960	46.3	53.0	0.7	–	–
17–19 June	İEA	1,500	43.4	48.1	0.8	4.2	3.5
15–16 June	KONDA	3,498	40.9	49.0	0.7	–	9.4
16 June	MAK	6,580	42.5	44.0	1.0	2.0	10.5
15 June	REMRES	6,580	48.5	51.1	0.3	–	–
12–14 June	ORC	6,580	48.3	47.7	0.6	3.4	–
13 June	ADA	9,000	48.3	50.6	1.1	–	–
8–12 June	Themis	–	36.6	42.8	0.7	10.4	9.5
12 June	AREDA	9,317	47.8	51.0	1.2	–	–
8–11 June	SONAR	3,400	46.7	52.3	0.9	–	–
29 May – 3 June	ORC	9,675	47.0	46.7	0.8	5.5	–
15–20 May	MAK	11,000	45.0	47.0	1.0	7.0	–
15-16 May	KONDA	-	40.1	50.1	0.7	–	9.2
21–22 April	Konsensus	1,040	48.1	50.2	1.7	–	–

== Results ==
=== Overall results ===
The following table is detailing the preliminary results of the Istanbul Mayoral Election, with more than 99% of the ballots counted. Official results were released by the Supreme Electoral Council. Both Yıldırım and Erdoğan acknowledged the defeat and congratulated Ekrem İmamoğlu on his re-election as Mayor of Istanbul.

A part of Ekrem İmamoğlu's speech at Republican People's Party Election Coordination Center after the results are announced.

Candidate	Party	Votes	%
Ekrem İmamoğlu	Republican People's Party	4,742,082	54.22
Binali Yildirim	Justice and Development Party	3,936,068	45.00
Necdet Gökçınar	Felicity Party	47,832	0.55
Mustafa İlker Yücel	Patriotic Party	13,962	0.16
Seçkin İlker	Independent	1,557	0.02
Dursunali Bacıoğlu	Independent	1,131	0.01
Lütfü Yılmaz	Independent	577	0.01
Doğan Duman	Independent	517	0.01
Fatma Ragibe Kanıkuru Loğoğlu	Independent	462	0.01
Vedat Öztürk	Independent	353	0.00
Muhammet Ali Canca	Independent	320	0.00
Ahmet Çördük	Independent	274	0.00
Mehmet Yıldız	Independent	242	0.00
Burak Kadıoğlu	Independent	233	0.00
Özkan Mustafa Küçükkural	Independent	202	0.00
Güldes Önkoyun	Independent	196	0.00
Burhan Erol	Independent	162	0.00
Ali Rıza Kansız	Independent	121	0.00
Memet Ali Aydoğmuş	Independent	94	0.00
Hasan Atasoy Torun	Independent	92	0.00
Abdulcelil Gülap	Independent	89	0.00
Total		8,746,566	100.00
Valid votes		8,746,566	98.00
Invalid/blank votes		178,600	2.00
Total votes		8,925,166	100.00
Registered voters/turnout		10,570,354	84.44

=== Results by district ===
District	Ekrem İmamoğlu (CHP)		Binali Yıldırım (AK Party)		Others		Valid votes		Voter turnout		Registered electors
District	# of votes	%	# of votes	%	# of votes	%	# of votes	%	# of votes	%	Registered electors
Adalar	7,378	71.0	2,977	28.6	42	0.4	10,397	98.3	10,580	83.9	12,608
Arnavutköy	53,894	38.8	83,701	60.2	1,388	1.0	138,983	97.3	142,814	82.5	173,036
Ataşehir	153,982	60.0	100,867	39.3	1,848	0.7	256,697	98.3	261,105	86.1	303,273
Avcılar	152,348	62.0	91,873	37.4	1,354	0.6	245,575	97.9	250,760	83.5	300,153
Bağcılar	172,694	42.5	230,271	56.6	3,739	0.9	406,704	97.8	416,006	83.5	498,314
Bahçelievler	180,441	52.0	163,896	47.2	2,775	0.8	347,112	97.9	354,488	83.9	422,645
Bakırköy	112,656	79.3	28,545	20.1	800	0.6	142,001	98.5	144,098	85.4	168,802
Başakşehir	104,571	47.5	112,968	51.4	2,395	1.1	219,934	97.9	224,757	85.0	264,503
Bayrampaşa	84,228	50.7	80,593	48.5	1,412	0.8	166,233	98.1	169,476	85.6	197,991
Beşiktaş	99,480	83.9	18,525	15.6	568	0.5	118,573	98.8	120,038	85.9	139,673
Beykoz	76,464	49.8	75,687	49.3	568	0.5	118,573	98.8	120,038	85.9	139,673
Beylikdüzü	118,351	61.9	71,543	37.4	1,153	0.6	191,047	98.2	194,539	85.3	228,079
Beyoğlu	69,824	51.6	64,346	47.5	1,184	0.9	135,354	98.0	138,161	82.7	167,012
Büyükçekmece	85,155	58.9	58,690	40.6	710	0.5	144,555	98.0	147,497	84.4	174,661
Çatalca	28,852	59.7	19,204	39.7	308	0.6	48,364	97.7	49,499	87.0	56,868
Çekmeköy	73,949	50.7	70,894	48.6	1,065	0.7	145,908	97.9	149,007	86.4	172,439
Esenler	96,051	38.0	154,094	61.0	2,358	0.9	252,503	97.8	258,297	84.1	307,041
Esenyurt	250,738	57.3	184,194	42.1	2,482	0.6	437,414	97.6	448,013	80.5	556,619
Eyüpsultan	125,766	53.9	105,559	45.3	1,919	0.8	233,244	98.1	237,736	85.8	277,158
Fatih	109,636	49.5	109,306	49.4	2,438	1.1	221,380	97.9	226,089	81.3	278,133
Gaziosmanpaşa	130,245	46.3	148,463	52.8	2,391	0.9	281,099	97.8	287,376	83.6	343,917
Güngören	82,987	48.8	85,555	50.3	1,415	0.8	169,957	98.0	173,442	83.5	207,741
Kadıköy	263,817	82.4	54,868	17.1	1,655	0.5	320,340	98.8	324,151	87.1	372,371
Kağıthane	126,131	48.6	131,328	50.6	2,267	0.9	259,726	98.0	264,920	83.9	315,945
Kartal	171,579	58.6	118,722	40.6	2,280	0.8	292,581	98.2	297,827	86.1	346,014
Küçükçekmece	264,600	59.6	176,518	39.7	3,135	0.7	444,253	97.8	454,137	84.1	539,925
Maltepe	197,322	63.3	112,198	36.0	2,012	0.6	311,532	98.2	317,098	85.4	371,097
Pendik	186,464	46.2	213,764	52.9	3,805	0.9	404,033	97.9	412,651	84.4	488,954
Sancaktepe	119,532	51.7	109,966	47.6	1,707	0.7	231,205	97.9	236,263	85.1	277,747
Sarıyer	128,864	61.6	78,970	37.8	1,272	0.6	209,106	98.3	212,750	85.4	249,257
Silivri	65,338	62.0	39,403	37.4	654	0.6	105,395	97.7	107,864	84.5	127,578
Sultanbeyli	56,995	32.9	114,130	66.0	1,852	1.1	172,977	97.4	177,506	83.4	212,729
Sultangazi	121,803	41.6	168,167	57.5	2,559	0.9	292,529	97.7	299,294	85.8	348,829
Şile	12,452	49.8	12,358	49.4	212	0.8	25,022	97.9	25,567	87.3	29,285
Şişli	122,731	73.7	43,127	25.9	774	0.5	166,632	98.4	169,407	83.2	203,711
Tuzla	78,680	53.2	67,944	46.0	1,238	0.8	147,862	98.0	150,803	85.0	177,421
Ümraniye	193,266	47.5	209,815	51.6	3,467	0.9	406,548	98.0	414,819	85.5	485,043
Üsküdar	183,671	54.3	151,634	44.8	3,186	0.9	338,491	98.3	344,391	85.6	402,468
Zeytinburnu	79,147	52.2	71,405	47.1	1,165	0.8	151,717	97.7	155,270	82.2	188,860
Istanbul	4,742,082	54.2	3,936,068	45.0	68,416	0.8	8,746,566	98.0	8,925,166	84.4	10,570,354
