= March 2019 Istanbul mayoral election =

Annulled Turkish municipal election

← 2014	31 March 2019	2019 (Jun) →
- Opinion polls
- Turnout: 83.86% (▼5.56 pp)
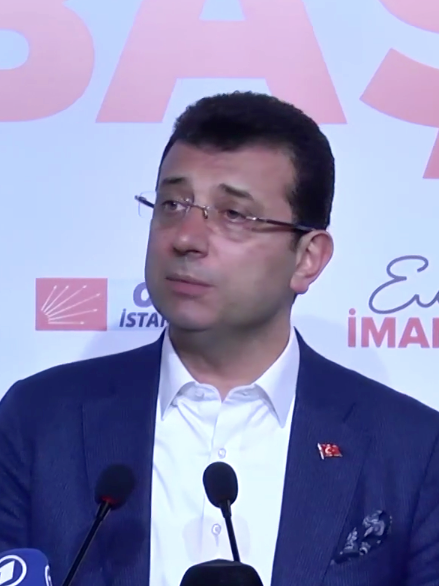

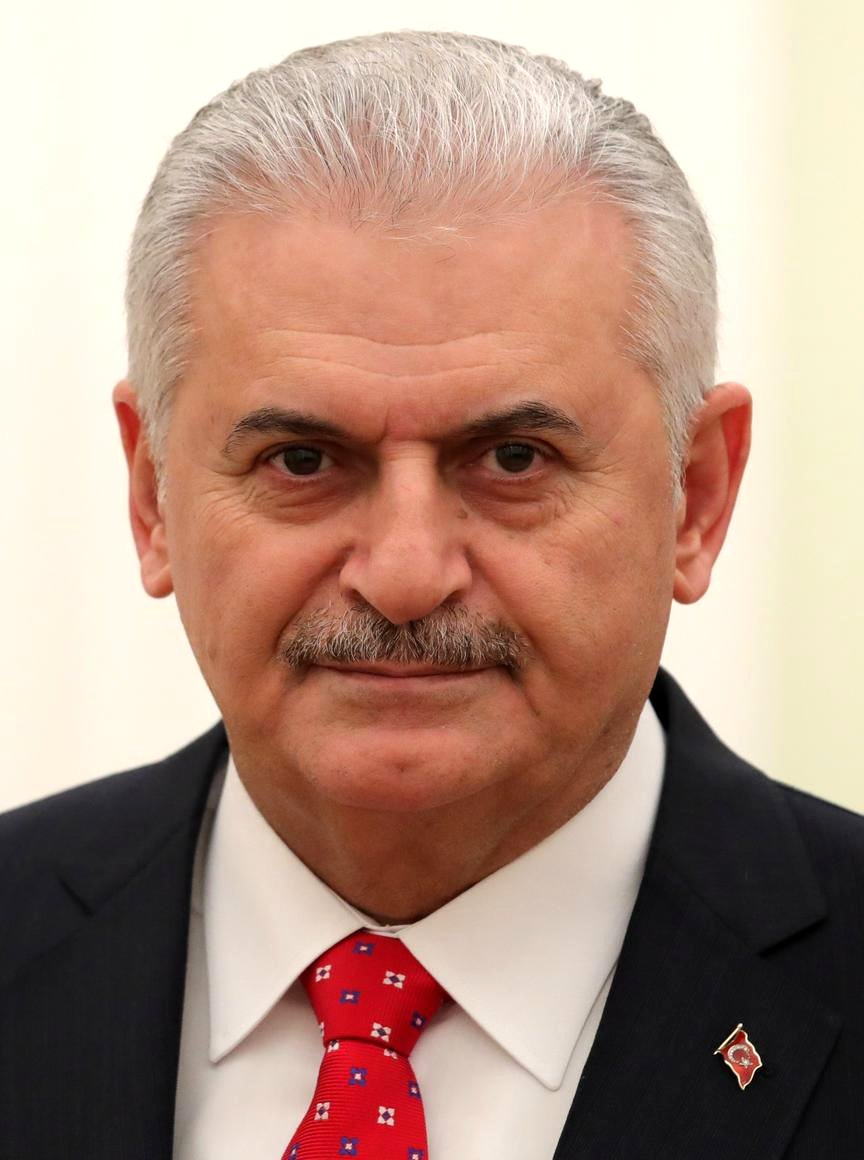
	First party	Second party
Candidate	Ekrem İmamoğlu	Binali Yıldırım
Party	CHP	AK Party
Alliance	Nation	People
Popular vote	4,169,765	4,156,036
Percentage	48.77%	48.61%
Swing	▲8.69%	▲0.66%
- Districts won by each candidate Ekrem İmamoğlu (17) Binali Yıldırım (22)
Mayor before election
Mevlüt Uysal
AK Party
Elected Mayor
Election results annulled
New election held in June 2019

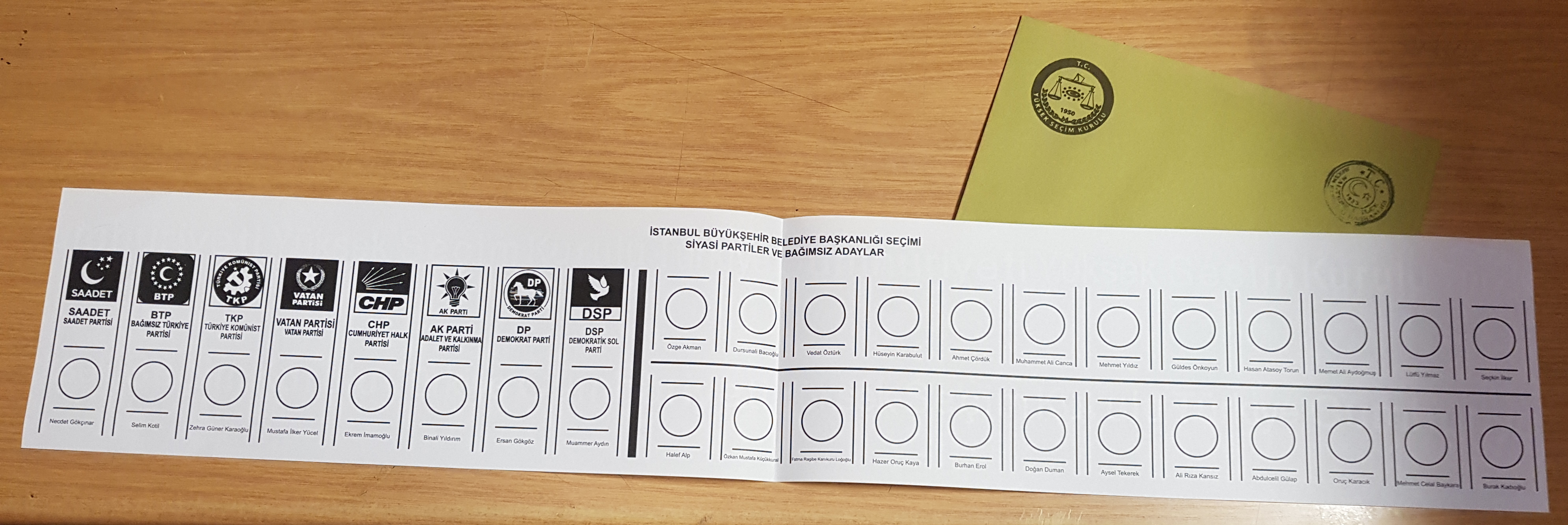
2019 Istanbul mayoral election ballot

The March 2019 Istanbul mayoral election took place on 31 March 2019, as part of the 2019 Turkish local elections. In addition to a mayor for the Istanbul Metropolitan Municipality, all 39 Istanbul districts elected their own individual mayors as well as district councillors.

Early results on election night showed that People's Alliance candidate Binali Yıldırım held a small lead over his Nation Alliance rival Ekrem İmamoğlu. However, as the lead narrowed and a blackout occurred over the reporting of new results, İmamoğlu overtook Yıldırım according to the Supreme Electoral Council (YSK) on noon on 1 April. Both candidates declared victory, with banners showing Yıldırım's image and the message 'thank you Istanbul' appearing in numerous places overnight.

Yıldırım and his Justice and Development Party (AK Party) announced that they would contest the results, citing electoral irregularities and a series of enumerating errors when recording results. AK Party complaints for a complete recount of all votes were accepted by the electoral authorities in 5 of Istanbul's 39 districts, with the remaining 34 districts being approved for a recount of invalid and blank votes only. The recount process ended on 16 April, 16 days after the election, with results showing İmamoğlu still in the lead by around 14,000 votes, down from the 23,000 lead he had after the initial count.

The AK Party then submitted an extraordinary complaint to annul and repeat the election. The party's officials cited a claim that voters had been illegally registered to vote in the district of Büyükçekmece, where police began an operation to locate fraudulent voters. A number of ballot box officials and civil servants were taken into custody. A number of pro-government media outlets also accused the FETÖ organisation of interfering in the results, but without any proof.

Following the conclusion of a full recount in Maltepe on 16 April, İmamoğlu was summoned by the electoral authorities to receive his certificate of election. However, his mayoralty was cut short by the AK Party's request for the election to be annulled, lasting 18 days; on 6 May, the YSK decreed that the election would be annulled and repeated on 23 June 2019. The re-run resulted in a victory for İmamoğlu with a much greater margin, so he resumed his duties on 27 June.

== Candidates ==
The nominee of the governing Justice and Development Party (AKP) is Binali Yıldırım, a former Prime Minister of Turkey and the incumbent Speaker of the Grand National Assembly. As part of the People's Alliance, the AKP's candidate will have the unconditional support of the Nationalist Movement Party (MHP).

On 18 December 2018, the main opposition Republican People's Party (CHP) announced their candidate to be the serving Mayor of the district of Beylikdüzü, Ekrem İmamoğlu. İmamoğlu is likely to have support from the İYİ Party, which itself is unlikely to put up its own candidate.

== Election day ==
After an initial substantive lead for Binali Yıldırım had shrunk, close to midnight, to a mere 48.71 percent, compared to the 48.65 of his opponent, Yıldırım proclaimed victory, while the state-run Anadolu Agency, which provided the television stations with the results as the counts came in, ceased updating the results for Istanbul entirely.

In the early hours of 1 April, where Anadolu Agency results showed Yıldırım in the lead by just 3,500 votes, Binali Yıldırım made a short speech declaring victory. A few hours later, with no update on the results, the AKP's Istanbul provincial chairman declared that they had won by around 3,000 votes. Ekrem İmamoğlu refuted the AKP's victory claims and criticised the AA for not updating the results count. He revealed that the CHP's records showed him in the lead by 29,000 votes and demanded the AA to update their results accordingly. The agency claimed that it had stopped receiving data from the field. Only the next afternoon were new results provided, showing a narrow lead for Ekrem İmamoğlu. The YSK confirmed İmamoğlu's lead in the afternoon of 1 April.

== Contestation and Annulment ==
Indicative results, with 100% of the votes counted, suggest that the opposition candidate Ekrem İmamoğlu won a narrow victory over the governing People's Alliance candidate Binali Yıldırım.

After the provisional results became public, the Justice and Development Party (AKP), who nominated Yıldırım, announced their intention to contest the results, stating that recounting the substantial number of invalid and blank votes could change the result. On 2 April 2019, the last possible day to file challenges, the AKP submitted complaints of alleged irregularities in all 39 districts. In response, the Supreme Electoral Council of Turkey ordered recounts in 18 of the 39 districts. The next day, Thursday 4 April, Istanbul's provincial election board overruled the decisions of the district election boards of the other districts not to hold a recount, and ordered recounts of all votes deemed invalid.

On Friday 5 April, it was reported that the AKP Istanbul applied to the Istanbul provincial election board for a total recount of all votes.

Speaking on Monday 8 April, President Erdoğan declared that the AKP had detected "organized crime" carried out during the election for Istanbul mayor and that the party had applied to the Supreme Election Council to annul the election, adding that "no one has the right to declare themselves victorious with a difference of around 13,000–14,000 votes". This while the AKP, on the day after the election, had hung tens of thousands of victory banners all over the city. The next day the AKP deputy chair confirmed that the AKP will apply to the Supreme Election Council for a new election in Istanbul.

On 17 April 2019, the Istanbul Electoral Council rejected a demand by the AKP to postpone its official determination until after the Supreme Election Council gave its ruling on the requested annulment, and declared Ekrem Imamoğlu to be the new mayor of Istanbul.

Yıldırım, on the other hand, declared on 28 April that he was not someone to seek to win a lost election. "The elections are behind us", he said, speaking during a traditional "Graduate Pilav Day" held at Kasımpaşa Anadolu Lisesi.

Speaking to the General Assembly of the Independent Industrialists and Businessmen Association (MÜSİAD) on 4 May, President Erdoğan called on the Supreme Electoral Council to annul the elections, stating, "My compatriots tell me, 'This election must be redone'."

The Supreme Electoral Council has then accepted the extraordinary objection of the Justice and Development Party (AKP), and ordered a re-run of the elections with a majority vote of 7 against 4.

=== Büyükçekmece ===
The AKP claimed that around 11,000 voters had illegally transferred their residency to the district of Büyükçekmece in order to vote in the Istanbul elections. Police subsequently began an operation in the district, taking the civil servant responsible into custody and raiding homes of alleged fraudulent voters. Their actions were widely condemned due to the lack of solid proof of any wrongdoing, with some residents accusing the police of demanding them to reveal who they voted for. The AKP referred the basis of their claims to their own party-held records, where they claimed they could identify voters' political preference 'by their surnames', causing further controversy.

== Results ==
The results as certified on 17 April 2019 by the Istanbul Electoral Council following the conclusion of all recounts – but annulled by the decision of the Supreme Electoral Council – are shown below.

Candidate	Party	Votes	%
Ekrem İmamoğlu	Republican People's Party	4,169,765	48.77
Binali Yildirim	Justice and Development Party	4,156,036	48.61
Necdet Gökçınar	Felicity Party	103,364	1.21
Muammer Aydın	Democratic Left Party	30,884	0.36
Selim Kotil	Independent Turkey Party	27,087	0.32
Ersan Gökgöz	Democrat Party	22,252	0.26
Mustafa İlker Yücel	Patriotic Party	15,428	0.18
Zehra Güner Karaoğlu	Communist Party of Turkey	10,349	0.12
Özge Akman	Independent	2,430	0.03
Doğan Duman	Independent	2,023	0.02
Aysel Tekerek	Independent	1,538	0.02
Lütfü Yılmaz	Independent	930	0.01
Mehmet Yıldız	Independent	663	0.01
Muhammet Ali Canca	Independent	581	0.01
Vedat Öztürk	Independent	553	0.01
Hüseyin Karabulut	Independent	534	0.01
Ahmet Çördük	Independent	523	0.01
Mehmet Celal Baykara	Independent	462	0.01
Güldes Önkoyun	Independent	443	0.01
Fatma Ragibe Kanıkuru Loğoğlu	Independent	420	0.00
Ali Rıza Kansız	Independent	397	0.00
Halef Alp	Independent	337	0.00
Özkan Mustafa Küçükkural	Independent	335	0.00
Burak Kadıoğlu	Independent	334	0.00
Dursunali Bacıoğlu	Independent	331	0.00
Hazer Oruç Kaya	Independent	310	0.00
Hasan Atasoy Torun	Independent	292	0.00
Abdulcelil Gülap	Independent	290	0.00
Burhan Erol	Independent	271	0.00
Memet Ali Aydoğmuş	Independent	261	0.00
Seçkin İlker	Independent	207	0.00
Oruç Karacık	Independent	192	0.00
Total		8,549,822	100.00
Valid votes		8,549,822	96.40
Invalid/blank votes		319,540	3.60
Total votes		8,869,362	100.00
Registered voters/turnout		10,570,939	83.90
