= List of honorary citizens of towns and cities in North Macedonia =

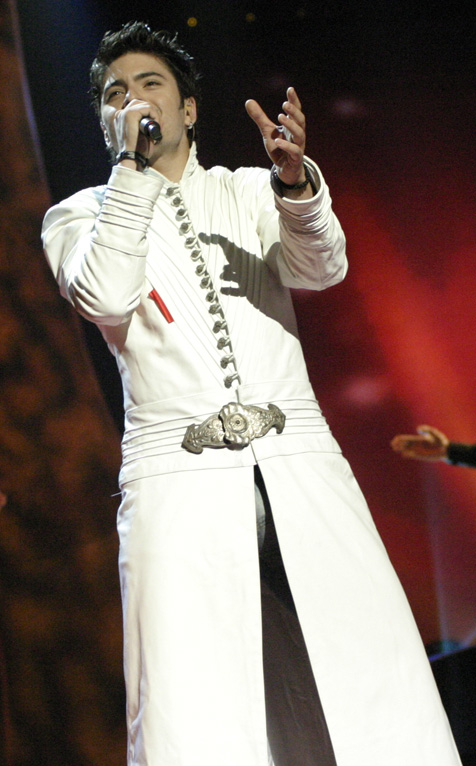
Tose Proeski (seen here) is an Honorary Citizen of Macedonia.

The title of honorary citizen of North Macedonia is awarded by towns or cities in North Macedonia to foreign or internal individuals for their great contributions to the recognising town or city.

== Honorary citizens of North Macedonia ==
- Tose Proeski

== Honorary citizens of Skopje ==
- Ivan Ribar
- Josip Broz Tito
- Władysław Gomułka
- Josef Cirankievich
- Olav V of Norway
- U Thant
- Mother Teresa
- Frenk Munning
- Umberto Vatani
- Sharik Tarа
- Christopher R. Hill
- Lawrence Eagleburger
- Thorvald Stoltenberg
- Werner Trini
- Filip Vujanović
- Richard Neuheisel

== Honorary citizens of Bitola ==
- Ajri Demirovski

== Honorary citizens of Kumanovo ==
- Lawrence Butler (former American ambassador to Macedonia)
- Louisa Vinton (former United Nations Resident Coordinator and UN Development Programme Resident Representative)

== Honorary citizens of Ohrid ==
- Ervan Fuere
- Mincho Jordanov
- Ljubčo Georgievski
- Sidney Sheldon

== Honorary citizens of Tetovo ==
- Stjepan Mesic
- Ramush Haradinaj.

== Honorary citizens of Veles ==
- Trifun Kostovski
- Stiven Heins
- Gjorgji Šoptrajanov

== Honorary citizens of Strumicɑ ==
Goce Arnaudov

== Honorary citizens of Čair ==
- Jozefina Topalli
- Inva Mula
- Recep Altepe
- Ferid Murad

== Honorary citizens of Probištip ==
- Vlado Jovanovski (Macedonian actor)

== Honorary Citizens of Kićevo ==
- Feridon Isiman (artist from North Cyprus)

== Honorary Citizen of Delćevo ==
- Katerina Trajkova Nurdjieva (nephew of Gotse Delchev) (2014)

== Honorary Citizens of Kisela Voda ==
- Boris Trajkovski

== Honorary Citizens of Debar ==
- Nikolaus Knauf (2008)
- Bamir Topi (2010)
- Sali Berisha (2013)
- Petrit Bara (Albanian cardiothoracic surgeon) (2013)

== Honorary Citizens of Novo Selo ==
- Robert Kirnak (Ambassador of Slovakia to Macedonia)

== Honorary Citizens of Kriva Palanka ==
- Milica Stojanova (Macedonian actress)

== See also ==
- Nationality law of North Macedonia
