= 2024 Bursa mayoral election =

Municipal election in Turkey

2024 Bursa mayoral elections
| ← 2019 | 31 March 2024; Part of the 2024 Turkish local elections | 2029 → |
- Metropolitan Municipality
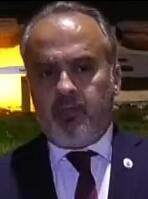
| Candidate | Mustafa Bozbey | Alinur Aktaş |
| Party | CHP | AK Party |
| Alliance | N/A | People's Alliance |
| Popular vote | 860.490 | 693.031 |
| Percentage | 47.62% | 38.35% |
- District Municipalities
- All 17 municipal districts of Bursa
| Party | Seats | +/– |
|---|---|---|
| AK Party | 9 | −4 |
| CHP | 6 | +3 |
| İYİ | 2 | +2 |
This lists parties that won seats. See the complete results below.
| Mayor before | Mayor after |
|---|---|
| Alinur Aktaş; AK Party | Mustafa Bozbey; CHP |

Local elections were held in Bursa, a metropolitan province of Turkey, on 31 March 2024 alongside nationwide local elections. Elections were held for the metropolitan municipal mayor of Bursa, as well as district mayors and councillors of Bursa's 17 districts.

The governing People's Alliance, formed by the Justice and Development Party (AK Party) and the smaller Nationalist Movement Party (MHP), nominated incumbent Mayor Alinur Aktaş for re-election. The opposition Republican People's Party (CHP) nominated Mustafa Bozbey, who had also been their candidate for the 2019 local elections but had narrowly lost to Aktaş.

The result was a victory for Bozbey, who won 47.6% of the vote compared to Aktaş's 38.4%. The CHP also doubled their number of district municipalities from three to six, while the AK Party lost three municipalities. This was the first time the AK Party lost control of Bursa since their first ever local elections in 2004.

== Opinion polls ==
| Date | Pollster | Sample | AK PARTY | CHP | İYİ | YRP | ZP | DEM | Others | Lead |
|---|---|---|---|---|---|---|---|---|---|---|
| 27-29 Mar | Özdemir | 2.400 | 38,9 | 45,8 | 2,7 | 5,5 | 4,1 | — | 3,0 | 6,9 |
| 22-26 Mar | ALF | 3.400 | 41,6 | 44,4 | 2,3 | 4,7 | — | — | 7 | 2,8 |
| 12-26 Mar | Avrasya | ? | 41,1 | 42,5 | — | — | — | — | 16,4 | 1,4 |
| 21-25 Mar | Areda Survey | 2.416 | 42,6 | 41,3 | 3,3 | 5,8 | 2,5 | 1,6 | 2,6 | 1,3 |
| 18-25 Mar | SAROS | 2.918 | 43,8 | 40,2 | 6,1 | 5,2 | — | — | 4,7 | 3,6 |
| 21-23 Mar | İVEM | 1.945 | 43,1 | 40,9 | 4,9 | 4,7 | 2,8 | — | 4,0 | 2,2 |
| 18-21 Mar | Aksoy | 2.400 | 39,5 | 48,8 | 1,4 | 3,9 | 2,5 | 1,9 | 2,1 | 9,3 |
| 17-20 Mar | ORC | 7.140 | 41,6 | 38,5 | 3,9 | 6,2 | 2,7 | 2,2 | 4,9 | 3,5 |
| 15-18 Mar | Pollstar | 4.700 | 38,2 | 45,0 | 5,7 | 6,0 | — | — | 5,1 | 6,8 |
| 12-17 Mar | ASAL | 1.400 | 39,5 | 41,2 | 3 | 5,3 | 3,5 | 2,3 | 5,2 | 1,7 |
| 1-15 Mar | ADA | 1.500 | 43,3 | 40,6 | 3,2 | 5,3 | 3,9 | — | 3,7 | 2,7 |
| 11-14 Mar | Aksoy | 1.067 | 38,8 | 45,2 | 2,6 | 4,1 | 3,4 | 2,1 | 3,8 | 6,4 |
| 1-14 Mar | ALF | 9.700 | 38,4 | 37,1 | 3,6 | 6,5 | 1,9 | — | 7,1 | 1,3 |
| 21 Şub-5 Mar | MAK | 2.370 | 45 | 41 | 2 | 1 | 1 | 2 | 3,0 | 4 |
| 20-24 Feb | Özdemir | 2.363 | 35,8 | 47,5 | 2,9 | 5,8 | 4,7 | 2,2 | 1,1 | 11,7 |
| 26-29 Jan | ORC | 5.200 | 38,3 | 41,4 | 5,4 | 2,1 | — | — | 2,5 | 3,1 |
2024
| 31 Mar 2019 | 2019 election | 1.810.393 | 49,6 | 47 | — | — | — | — | 3,4 | 2,6 |
