= Ekrem İmamoğlu =

Turkish politician and mayor of Istanbul (born 1970)

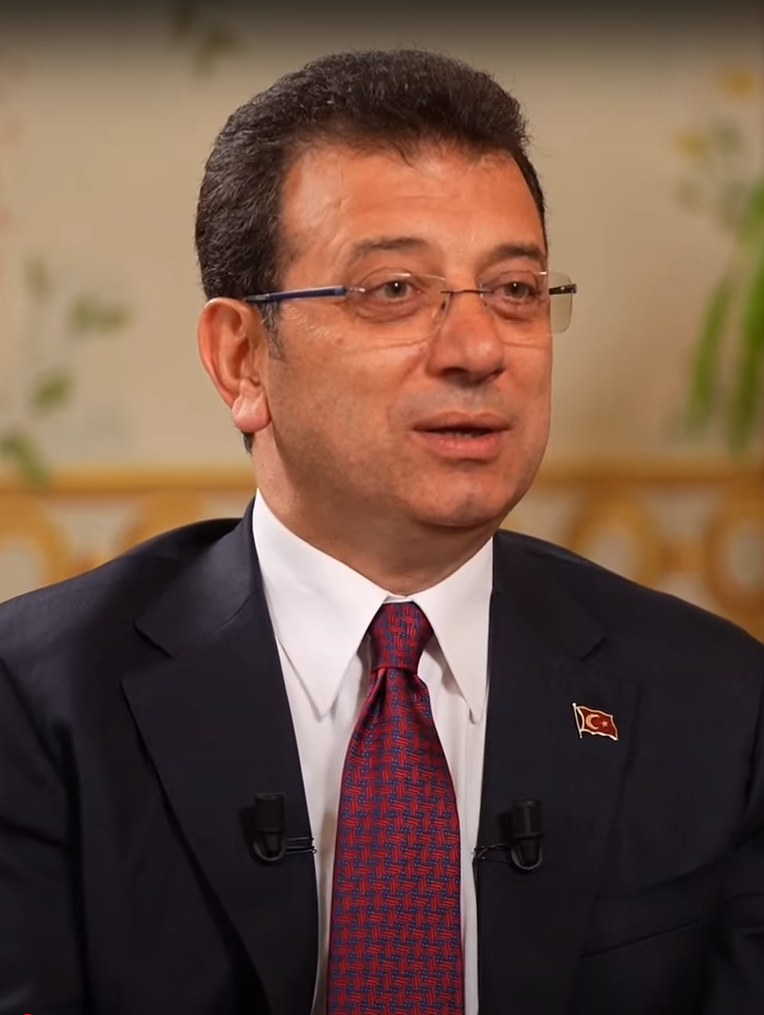
- İmamoğlu in 2024

Mayor of Istanbul
- Suspended
- Assumed office 27 June 2019
- Preceded by: Ali Yerlikaya (acting)
- Succeeded by: Nuri Aslan (acting)
- In office 17 April 2019 – 6 May 2019
- Preceded by: Mevlüt Uysal
- Succeeded by: Ali Yerlikaya (acting)

Mayor of Beylikdüzü
- In office 1 April 2014 – 7 April 2019
- Preceded by: Yusuf Uzun
- Succeeded by: Mehmet Murat Çalık

Personal details
- Born: 4 June 1970 (age 56) Akçaabat, Trabzon, Turkey
- Party: New Party (since 2026)
- Other political affiliations: ANAP (1992); CHP (2008–2026)
- Spouse: Dilek Kaya (m. 1995)
- Children: 3
- Education: Istanbul University (BA, MA)
- Website: www.ekremimamoglu.com

Ekrem İmamoğlu (Note: [ecˈɾæm iˈmamoːɫu]) (born 4 June 1970) is a Turkish politician who has served as the 32nd Mayor of Istanbul since 2019. In 2025, he was suspended from office by decree of the Ministry of Interior and subsequently held at Marmara Prison pending the outcome of ongoing legal proceedings. He denies the accusations and claims they have been politically motivated. He was the Republican People's Party (CHP) presumptive candidate for the next Turkish presidential election since 2025. After the CHP's judicially-enforced takeover by a previous leadership, İmamoğlu resigned from CHP and declared his support for the newly founded New Party in August 2026.

İmamoğlu was born in Akçaabat and moved to Istanbul in 1987. He attained a Bachelor's degree in business administration and a Master's degree in human resource management from Istanbul University and then worked as a developer in his family's construction and real estate business. In 2002, he became a board member of the multi-sport club Trabzonspor. İmamoğlu joined the CHP in 2008 and acted as president of party's local chapter in Beylikdüzü before being elected as mayor of Beylikdüzü in 2014. İmamoğlu was nominated by the CHP to replace Kadir Topbaş as Mayor of Istanbul in 2017 but the position went to Mevlüt Uysal.

In March 2019, İmamoğlu was elected as Mayor of Istanbul in an upset victory against the ruling AK Party-backed candidate Binali Yıldırım: despite the AK Party successfully annulling and repeating the election that June, İmamoğlu was reelected. In his first term, İmamoğlu combatted child malnutrition by improving access to milk from local dairy farmers, provided tertiary education scholarships, reduced public transportation fares and utility costs for certain residents, and oversaw Istanbul's response to the COVID-19 pandemic. İmamoğlu's environmental initiatives included launching a program to clean the Golden Horn and replacing phaetons with all-electric vehicles on the Princes' Islands. He led the restoration of the Esenler Coach Terminal and expanded the city's public transport network. İmamoğlu was reelected as Istanbul Mayor for a second term in 2024, and is considered a front-runner for the 2028 presidential election.

Ekrem İmamoğlu was nominated as the presidential candidate of the CHP in a primary election held on 23 March 2025, where he was the sole candidate. After this, his university diploma was cancelled by Istanbul University citing irregularities in his transfer from another school. These coincided with İmamoğlu's formal arrest and pre-trial detention on 23 March 2025, the same day as the primary, following raids related to allegations of corruption, bribery, extortion, and leading a criminal organisation at the Istanbul Metropolitan Municipality (a separate terrorism probe saw no arrest warrant issued). He was sent to Silivri Prison and suspended from his mayoral role. The events triggered widespread protests across Turkey, including in Istanbul, Ankara, and Izmir, often facing police intervention and temporary bans.

From prison, İmamoğlu has continued to challenge the government amid ongoing trials and restrictions, facing over 10 cases, including a major corruption trial seeking more than 2,000 years in prison.

== Early life ==
İmamoğlu was born in the town of Akçaabat, west of the city Trabzon, on 4 June 1970. During early childhood, he lived in the rural communities Cevizli and Yıldızlı, southwest of Akçaabat. He graduated from Trabzon High School, where he played amateur football and handball. After his graduation from Trabzon High School, he studied at the Girne American University in Kyrenia, Cyprus and he played as a goalkeeper at Türk Ocağı Limasol S.K. In 1987 his family moved to Istanbul. He attended Istanbul University, and received a Bachelor's degree in business administration and a Master's degree in human resource management. Following his graduation, he joined his family's business in construction. In 1995, he married Dilek Kaya, and together they have three children. In 2002–2003, he served as a board member of Trabzonspor, and he was also a vice president of the Trabzonspor B.K. basketball team.

== Political career ==
Since İmamoğlu's father was a member of the Motherland Party (ANAP), İmamoğlu briefly participated in the youth wing of the party in early 1990s although his mother's family was supportive of the Republican People's Party (CHP). İmamoğlu joined the CHP in 2008, and was elected as the head of the party's youth wing in 2009. On 16 September 2009, he was selected by the CHP as the president of party's local chapter in the Istanbul district of Beylikdüzü. He was then reelected to this position on 8 March 2012, before resigning on 15 July 2013 to run for mayor of Beylikdüzü. The election was held on 30 March 2014, as part of the 2014 Turkish local elections, and İmamoğlu won with 50.83% of the vote, defeating the incumbent AK Party candidate Yusuf Uzun.

Following the announcement of Istanbul Municipality Mayor Kadir Topbaş's resignation on 23 September 2017, İmamoğlu was nominated by the CHP to replace him. In the Istanbul Municipal Assembly election to fulfill the remainder of Topbaş's term, İmamoğlu lost to the AKP candidate Mevlüt Uysal after three rounds, by a mostly party-line vote of 125 to 179.

=== 2019 mayoral elections ===
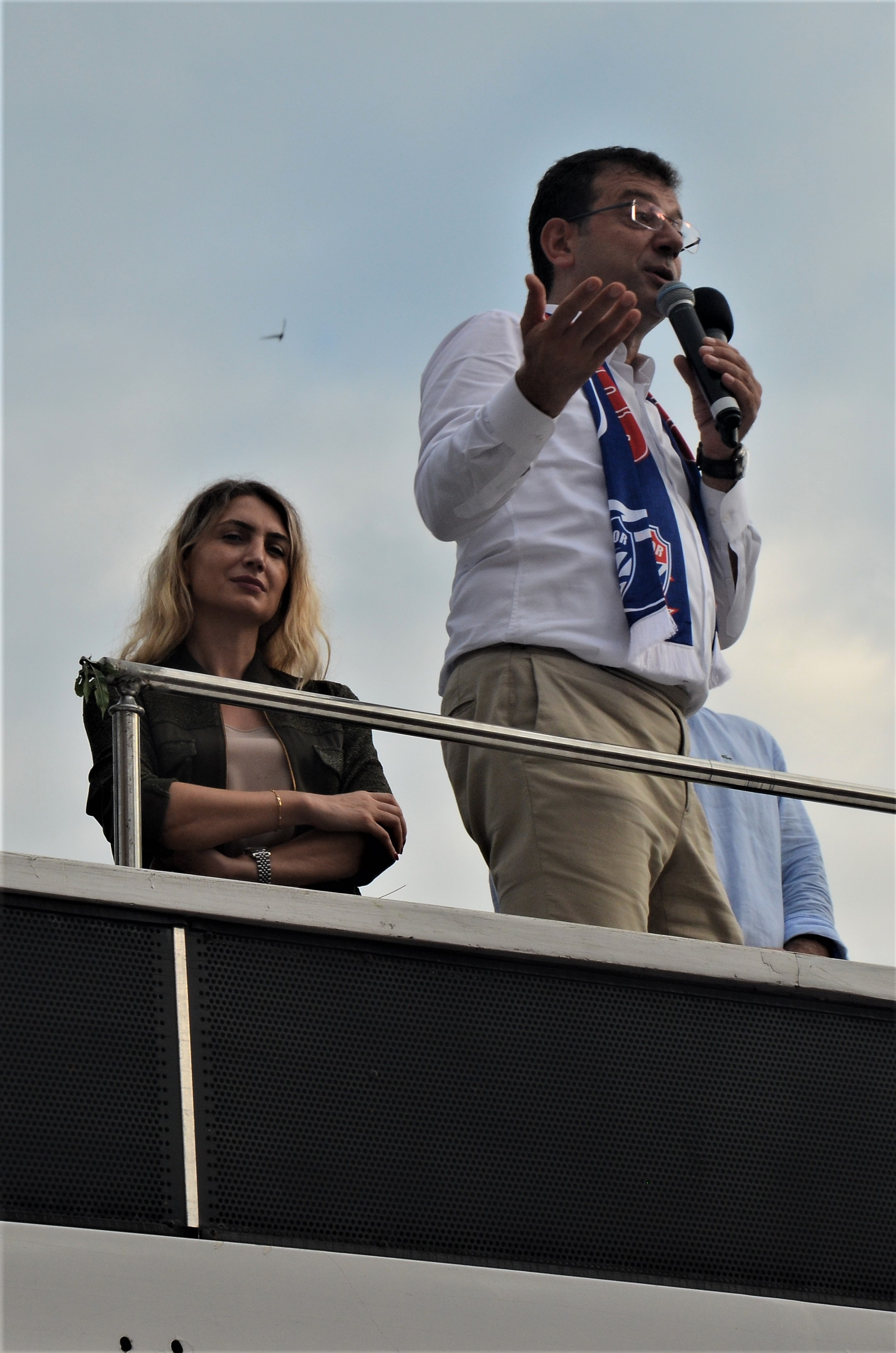
Ekrem İmamoğlu and his spouse Dilek during his June 2019 Istanbul mayoral election campaign in Silivri

The CHP again nominated İmamoğlu for the 2019 Istanbul mayoral election on 18 December 2018. Both the Good Party, which formed an alliance with the CHP, and Peoples' Democratic Party (HDP) declined to nominate candidates, which may have increased support for İmamoğlu.

In the run-up to the elections, his campaign received worldwide attention for its mild-mannered and unifying approach, resulting in a narrowing of opinion polls against his rival, People's Alliance candidate Binali Yıldırım. The election was held on 31 March 2019, with İmamoğlu defeating AK Party candidate Binali Yıldırım by roughly 25,000 votes according to the election day totals released by the Supreme Electoral Council. Following his upset victory in which the ruling AK Party significantly outspent him and received more media coverage, İmamoğlu was called a rising star in Turkish politics and a potential candidate to challenge Recep Tayyip Erdoğan in the 2023 Turkish presidential election.

The AK Party disputed the election results on behalf of its candidate, alleging that invalid votes may have swayed the election, and erected large posters in the city proclaiming Yıldırım as the election's winner. İmamoğlu, in turn, accused the AK Party of being "bad losers." Following a government-backed recount, İmamoğlu's lead was reduced to roughly 16,000 votes. Later, the Turkish electoral council declared the election invalid and ordered a repeat of the election, İmamoğlu won the repeat election by a larger margin.

== Mayor of Istanbul (2019–present) ==
İmamoğlu was sworn in as Mayor of Istanbul on 17 April 17 days after the election, following the conclusion of all recounts. His mayoral tenure came to an end when on 6 May 2019, the Supreme Electoral Council annulled the election results and removed him as Mayor of Istanbul. According to the YSK (Turkish Council of Elections), the decision was taken because some presiding officers and polling staff were not civil servants. Turkish law stipulates they must be civil servants. However, many have called this action as a move to undo the will of the voters, who handed a narrow but fiercely contested victory to the opposition candidate. Governor Ali Yerlikaya was named the interim mayor by the Interior Ministry of Turkey on 7 May 2019.

A new election was held on 23 June 2019, in which İmamoğlu was re-elected as the mayor of Istanbul, with a lead of more than 800,000 votes this time. Following his second loss to İmamoğlu, Yıldırım conceded defeat and also congratulated İmamoğlu on his re-election as mayor of Istanbul. Erdoğan also congratulated İmamoğlu and acknowledged that he won the election. İmamoğlu was then sworn into office on 27 June 2019. The same day he also received his mayoral certificate for the second time.

=== Environmental actions ===
İmamoğlu started a continuous bottom mud cleaning in the Golden Horn, which was frequently on the agenda with water pollution. After a long time, the Golden Horn regained its natural vitality, with fish swimming and dolphins racing. The phaeton, which has been the subject of controversy on the Princes' Islands due to its adverse health effect on horses and the carriages' impact on passing infectious diseases, was replaced by all-electric vehicles as a result of the "Prince's Islands Transportation Workshop" program. Against the earthquake risk, which is the top priority of Istanbul, risky areas and unsafe buildings are detected with detection scans all over the city. İmamoğlu has been critical of the Turkish government's plan to build the Istanbul Canal, which would link the Sea of Marmara and the Black Sea through a second waterway alongside the natural Bosporus.

=== Socioeconomic actions ===
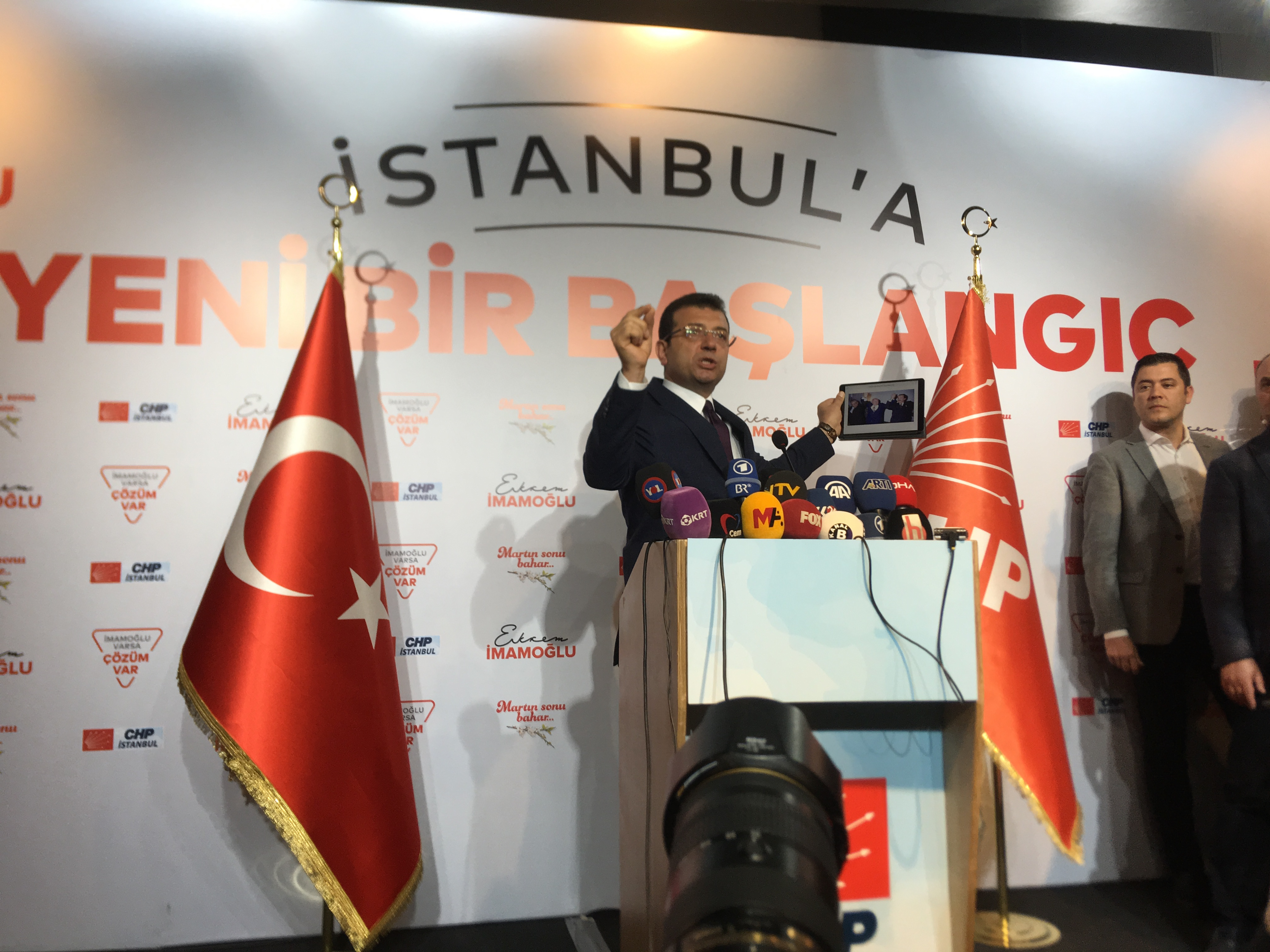
Ekrem İmamoğlu giving a speech in 2019

The People's Milk project that started for children to have access to milk has reached more than 130 thousand children. The People's Milk project has been launched to prevent malnutrition, one of the most important dangers of urban poverty, and to provide economic and psychological support to families, also to support local dairy farmers. Milk, which is procured from producers in Çatalca and Silivri, providing a budget of more than 3 million liras to the local economy, is delivered to children in Istanbul as a reliable and healthy food source. "Istanbul is our Home" kindergartens, which provide equal opportunities in education for children who are deprived of pre-school education and their families, were established as centers that were meticulously planned in accordance with the physical and social needs of children. In Istanbul, which hosts the leading universities of Turkey, education support scholarships were provided to 63 thousand students for the first time in the history of Istanbul.

With the monthly student subscription fee reduced from 80 TL to 50 TL, Istanbul became the city that provides the cheapest student transportation in Turkey. Regional Employment Offices, one of the important projects implemented by IMM, enabled more than 17 thousand citizens to participate in employment as of June 2021. Mothers with children aged 0–4 residing in Istanbul were given free public transportation right in Istanbul. The Mother Card, which increases the participation of mothers in social life and contributes to the family economy, has been used more than 8 million times to date. An online aid campaign has been launched, calling on better-off residents to help financially troubled dwellers in paying their unpaid bills, as the coronavirus pandemic has strained many households in Turkey's largest city. People who want to help can participate in solidarity through a reliable platform by donating whatever they want from the Family Support, Mother-Baby and Student Support packages prepared by IMM to deliver to those in need. People's Bread project turned into a social aid campaign spontaneously after İmamoğlu thanked a benevolent Istanbulite for demanding that all bread in a mobile Halk Ekmek kiosk be paid for and delivered to those in need.

The support given by philanthropists to deliver them to families in need has exceeded 1 million lira in total. The water bills of Istanbul residents were reduced by up to 34% and the human right to water was introduced for every Istanbulite. Accordingly, 0.5 cubic meters, or 500 liters, of every 2.5 cubic meters of water consumed in residences is now considered a "human right to water". 9 years after this right was accepted at the UN Human Rights Council, Istanbul residents are starting to get their rights for the first time. IMM gives priority to women's cooperatives in the products to be supplied to families in need, with the movement it started throughout Turkey, especially in Istanbul, for the participation of women in production and the evaluation of women's labor. The Newborn Support Package was launched to support families in need. Packages containing everything that a baby and a mother will need in the first 4 months, from feeding bottles to thermometers, from booties to pajamas, from baby shampoo to diapers and family training books, have reached the first families and the distribution of new ones continues. In addition, the families that the package reaches are visited by experts for a year, and their needs are determined.

=== Constructions and infrastructure ===
Esenler Coach Terminal, where many newcomers to Istanbul were welcomed for the first time and which has been on the agenda for many years with its abandoned and dangerous condition, has become a safe and comfortable terminal as a result of a detailed project design. The floods, which occurred after the rain in most parts of the city and caused great financial losses to the Istanbulites, were largely eliminated. As of December 2020, works were completed in 63 of 104 chronically flooded locations in Istanbul under the coordination of IMM. Haliç Shipyard, which has not been operated for many years and is on the verge of closure, has gained life both historically and functionally with meticulous work done by IMM. The shipyard also undertakes the production of Sea Taxis, which will be put into service by IMM in the near future. As a result of the works that started with the aim of IMM focusing on rail systems in the new period and making rail systems the backbone of public transportation, İmamoğlu claimed on Twitter that Istanbul became the city with the most subway constructions carried out at the same time. Due to the lack of funds for a long time, the 103.4-kilometer-long metro construction in 10 metro lines, most of which was incomplete or never started, was stopped. Funds were provided from financial institutions, which gained the trust of the management approach based on transparency and merit in Istanbul, for the move that put an end to a waste of 11 billion liras. Eminönü-Alibeyköy Tram Line, which was stopped due to financing problems, was completed in the new period of IMM and opened to the service of Istanbulites.

=== Cultural projects ===
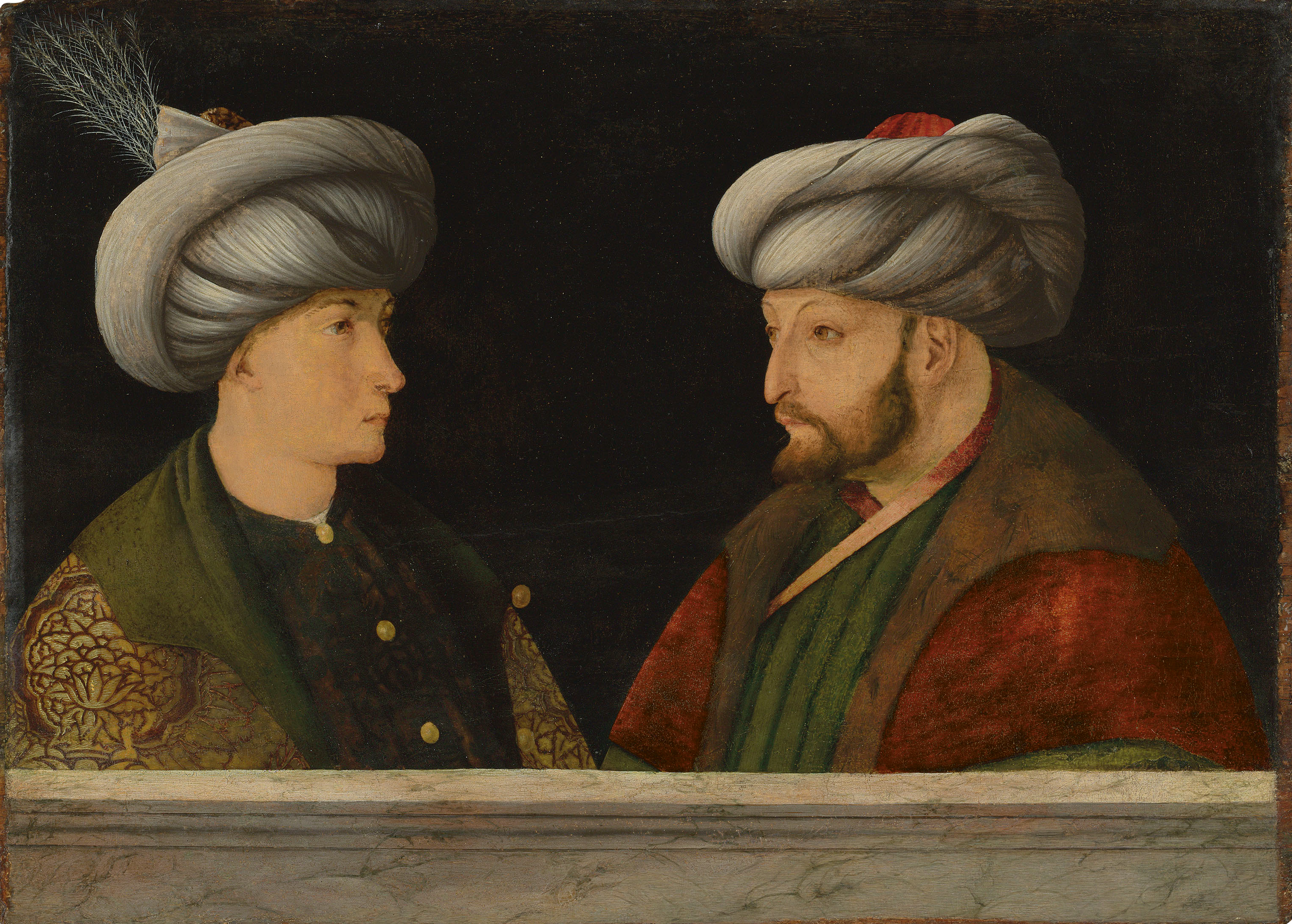
Portrait of Sultan Mehmed II with a young dignitary, Gentile Bellini

IMM purchased the 540-year-old portrait of Mehmed the Conqueror at an auction opened by the London National Gallery. Two different projects have been implemented to support musicians and theaters who have been subjected to a difficult process due to the pandemic, which caused the cultural and artistic activities to come to a complete halt.

=== Agriculture and farming ===
To support farmers, IMM gave animal feed and seedlings to 474 producers. 16,380 tons of crops were obtained in 2020 with the re-introduction of agricultural lands that were left idle.

=== Alleged assassination attempt ===
On 1 December 2020, OdaTV reported that the Islamic State plotted to assassinate İmamoğlu. It was reported that a group of ISIS militants had been caught. Also, İmamoğlu's security guards had been instructed to "be more careful" on 23 November 2020. The Interior Minister Süleyman Soylu said: "We receive intelligence like this from time to time, but they are not disclosed to the public," but the Turkish Police denied that an assassination attempt was in place. It also refuted claims that the assassins were apprehended.

=== Trial ===
On 14 December 2022, Ekrem İmamoğlu was sentenced to two years in prison for calling the Turkish Supreme Election Council "fools" three years prior. The ruling was seen as an attempt by the Erdoğan government to centralize power against popular opposition, and remove a potential political rival. The trial drew wide international condemnation, and protests were organized in front of the Istanbul Municipality in response to it. Additionally, European mayors gathered in Istanbul in a show of support.

=== 2023 presidential elections ===
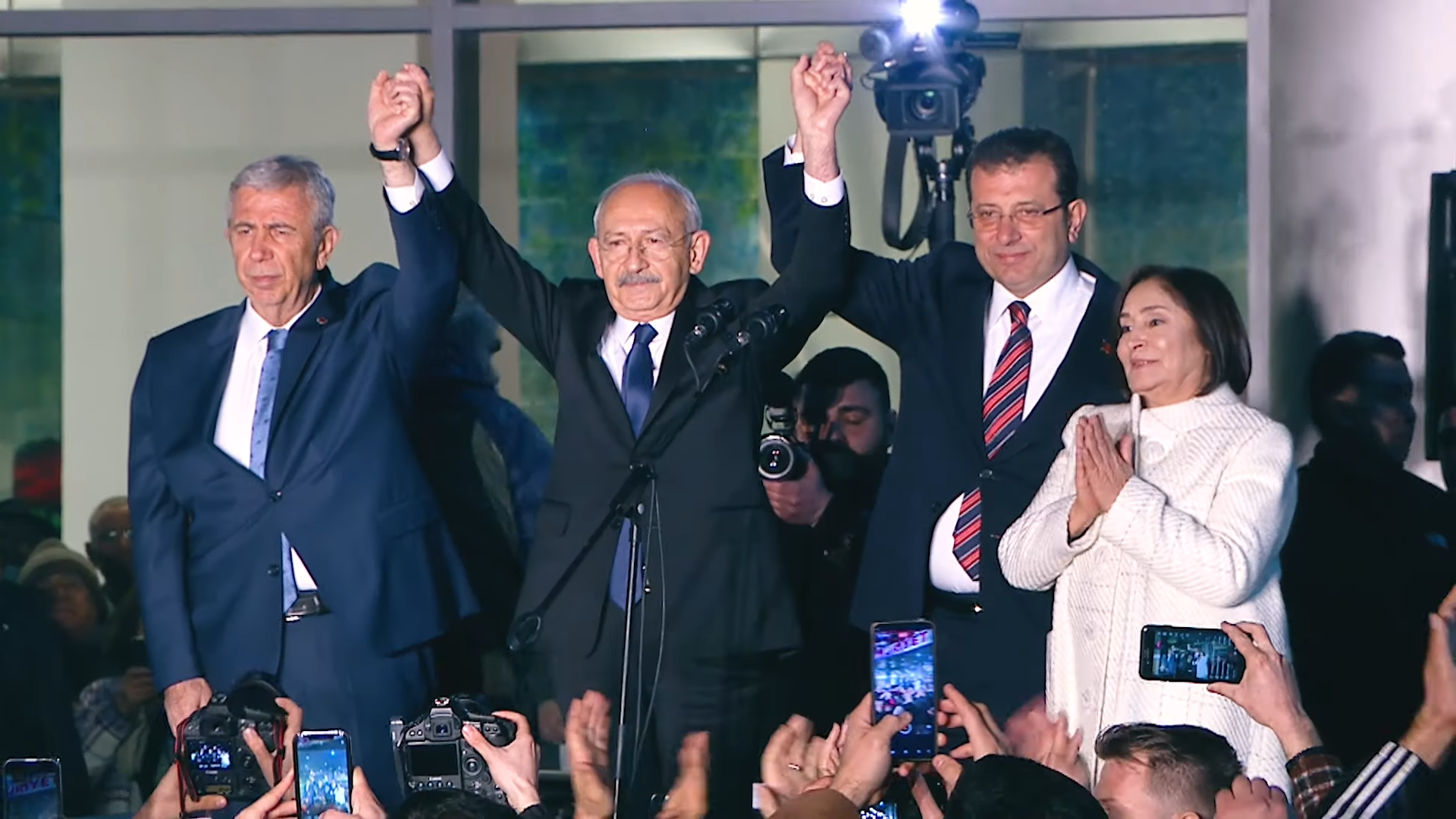
Announcement of Ekrem İmamoğlu and Mansur Yavaş as vice presidential candidates by Kemal Kılıçdaroğlu

For the 2023 Turkish presidential elections, leader of the CHP, Kemal Kılıçdaroğlu declared his candidacy. Ekrem İmamoğlu, Mansur Yavaş and the leaders of five parties in the Nation Alliance were named as vice-president candidates.

On 7 May, Ekrem İmamoğlu was attacked during a pro-Kılıçdaroğlu rally in Erzurum. His rally was interrupted, and stones were thrown by a mob of roughly 200 people, who attacked both the people gathered for the rally and İmamoğlu. İmamoğlu said at least 9 people from the rally crowd were wounded by the stones that were thrown by the attackers. Later it was reported that 17 people were severely wounded and taken to the hospital. Government officials and members of the leading party praised the attackers and blamed İmamoğlu for hosting the rally in Erzurum.

Following Turkish President Recep Tayyip Erdogan's victory in the presidential runoff election on 28 May 2023, İmamoğlu called for significant changes inside the major opposition Republican People's Party (CHP).

During a press conference on 7 June, İmamoğlu indirectly challenged CHP leader Kemal Kılıçdaroğlu, claiming that cosmetic changes, such as dissolving and renewing the party's central management committee, would be insufficient to accomplish true transformation.

On 28 July, he wrote a letter to the newspaper Oksijen explaining what he meant by "change within his party." His letter came one day after he stated that society demanded that the CHP's leadership and administration be changed. In a comprehensive letter, İmamoğlu stated that present political party structures "do not meet the needs of Turkey."

=== 2025 arrest ===
On 19 March 2025, İmamoğlu was arrested by Turkish Police on charges related to alleged corruption along with more than 100 people. He was also alleged to have aided the Kurdistan Workers' Party (PKK). On 18 March 2025, Istanbul University annulled İmamoğlu's degree, citing irregularities, which blocks him from running for president. The decision came just days before the opposition was set to nominate him as a presidential candidate for the 2028 election. He was visited in prison 11 days later by an EU delegation led by Katarina Barley.

Following his arrest, İmamoğlu's party, the CHP, called it a "civilian coup" and called for nationwide protests. Subsequently, the governor of Istanbul, Davut Gül, imposed a four-day ban on protests in the city. The government also restricted access to several social media platforms following the detention. Despite the restrictions, protesters gathered outside Şişli Municipality and held slogans in support of İmamoğlu.

Despite assembly bans and police crackdowns, hundreds of thousands have rallied, with nearly 1,900 people detained since the protests began. Opposition leader Özgür Özel condemned the arrests, accusing the government of attempting to intimidate and silence dissent. President Recep Tayyip Erdoğan has dismissed the protests, warning that those inciting unrest "have nowhere to go".

On 16 July 2025, İmamoğlu was convicted of insulting and threatening Istanbul's Chief Public Prosecutor Akın Gürlek and sentenced to one year and eight months' imprisonment. The charges followed comments İmamoğlu made in January when he accused Gürlek of targeting opposition figures through politically motivated investigations.

On 11 November 2025, Turkish prosecutors charged İmamoğlu with 142 offences, which Turkey’s opposition leader said were intended to prevent İmamoğlu’s political ascent. The indictment accused İmamoğlu of leading a sprawling criminal organization and sought a cumulative prison sentence exceeding 2,000 years—an extraordinary demand that opposition figures described as disproportionate and indicative of a politically driven attempt to remove President Recep Tayyip Erdoğan’s most formidable rival from public life.

== Political positions ==
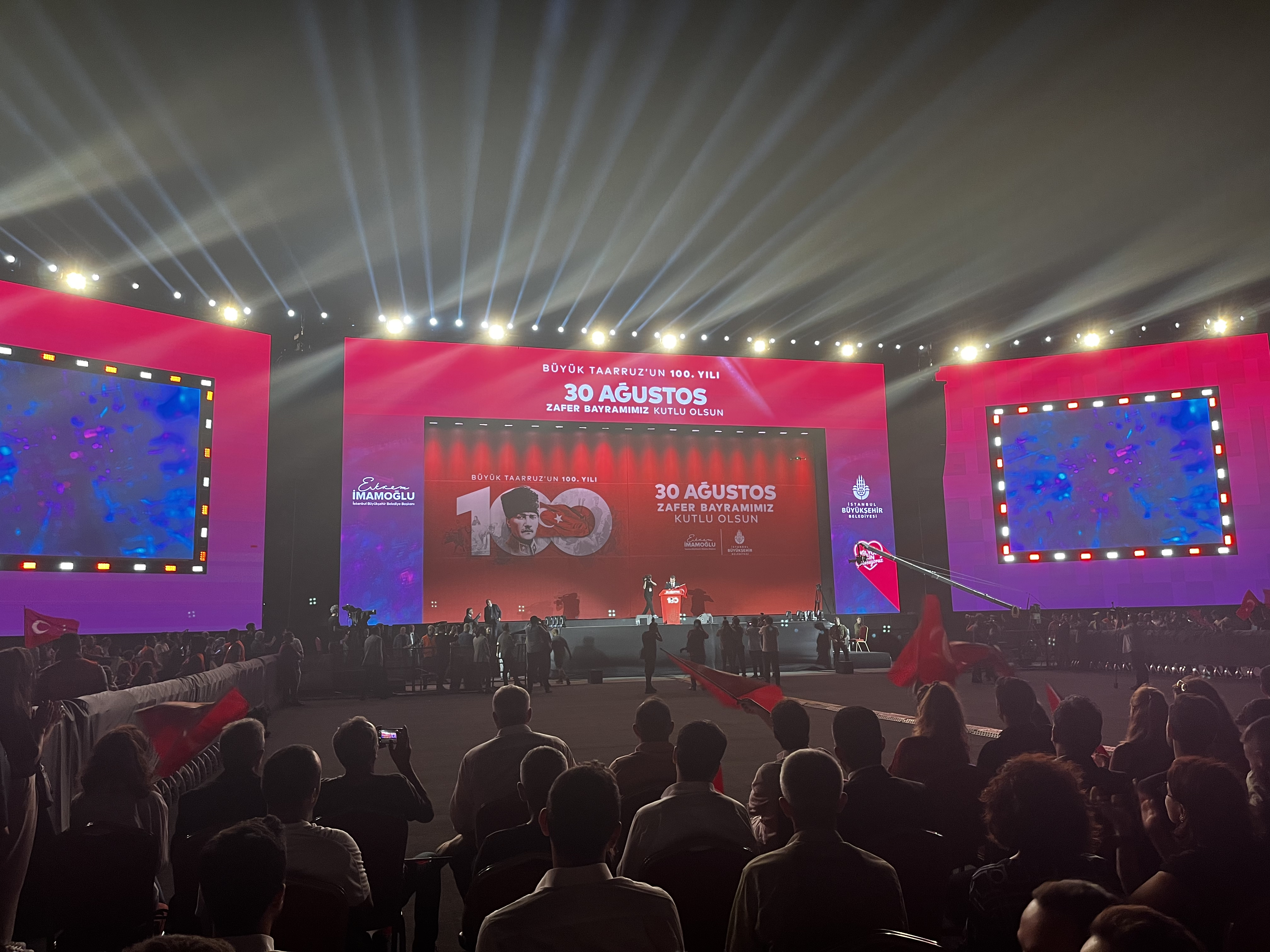
30 August public holiday celebrations at Yenikapı with Ekrem İmamoğlu

İmamoğlu describes himself as a social democrat and that he became a social democrat during his education in Cyprus after being influenced by his friends. He is a member of the Kemalist organization Atatürkist Thought Association. In an act which was deemed as opposition to corruption, he displayed columns with hundreds of cars at the Yenikapı Square which were rented by the administration he succeeded. İmamoğlu has also condemned the government's ban of a Kurdish-language adaption of Dario Fo's Trumpets and Raspberries over its alleged support of the Kurdistan Workers' Party (PKK). At a Mayors summit in Copenhagen, Denmark, he joined forces with other Mayors and discussed how to make their cities better prepared for climate change. İmamoğlu was awarded the Kybele German-Turkish Friendship Award in November 2019. The award was presented to İmamoğlu by former German President Christian Wulff. In relation to the Hagia Sophia museum being reconverted back into a mosque İmamoğlu stated "for me it has been a mosque since 1453".

=== Foreign policy ===
Since he was elected the Mayor of Istanbul, İmamoğlu sought to effectively revitalise the bleak ties with the European Union. Advocating for the accession of Turkey into the EU, he considers the union a "democratic peace project" and states that it is the proof nations can unite and stand in solidarity, no matter the differences in ethnicity, language, or religion. However, he was often critical of the EU's stance on Turkey ─ remarking that the union ignores the nearing change in Turkey, İmamoğlu mentioned the lack of cooperation with the democrats. Over the years, his speeches at the Council of Europe drew attention to the EU migration policy. İmamoğlu asserted that the model to "export" migrants to third-party countries, referring to Turkey, is a contradiction of European values, and thus invited the EU to "share of burden" and implement a definitive solution ─ ensuring political stability and prosperity in the origin countries through international collaboration.

Amidst the Gaza war in April 2024, İmamoğlu criticised the "brutal oppression" of Palestinians, and called for an end to the violence against innocent Palestinians, including women and children. He unambiguously condemned Hamas in a public statement labeling the group a "terrorist organization." In an interview with CNN, İmamoğlu expressed his sorrow over the October 7 attacks carried out by Hamas in Israel, stating that any group responsible for organized terrorist attacks and mass killings should be considered a terrorist organization.

=== LGBT rights ===
Two days after İmamoğlu first took the office, 27th Istanbul Pride Parade was once again banned by the Istanbul Governor's Office, the regional administrative body subordinating to the central government. He was then asked for opinion by international correspondents, in which he answered that he would never be a mayor that dissociates or questions any life, form, belief or philosophy of life. In 2020, responding to a question about allegations made by some newspapers that he designed a project to legalise same-sex marriage, İmamoğlu stated that they have the responsibility to safeguard the civil rights of LGBT citizens, but also remarked "society is not ready for legalisation of same-sex marriage". During his administration, an official from SPoD, a prominent LGBT studies organization in Turkey, was elected to the Executive Board of the Istanbul Urban Council, making them the first openly LGBT person ever to hold office.

== Electoral history ==
=== Local elections ===
Election	Party	Votes	%	Outcome	Map
March 2014 Beylikdüzü	Republican People's Party	76,034	50.83%	1st	
March 2019 Istanbul	Republican People's Party	4,169,765	48.77%	1st	
June 2019 Istanbul	Republican People's Party	4,742,082	54.22%	1st	
March 2024 Istanbul	Republican People's Party	4,438,727	51.21%	1st	

== Notes ==
Political offices
Preceded by Ali Yerlikaya acting	Mayor of Istanbul; 27 June 2019 – present	Succeeded by Incumbent
Preceded by Mevlüt Uysal	Mayor of Istanbul; 17 April 2019 – 6 May 2019	Succeeded by Ali Yerlikaya acting
Preceded by Yusuf Uzun	Mayor of Beylikdüzü; 1 April 2014 – 7 April 2019	Succeeded by Mehmet Murat Çalık
