= YSK =

YSK may refer to:

- Sanikiluaq Airport, Nunavut, Canada, IATA airport code YSK
- Supreme Election Council (Turkey) (Yüksek Seçim Kurulu)
