= Dilek İmamoğlu =

Turkish academic, author, activist and wife of the mayor of Istanbul

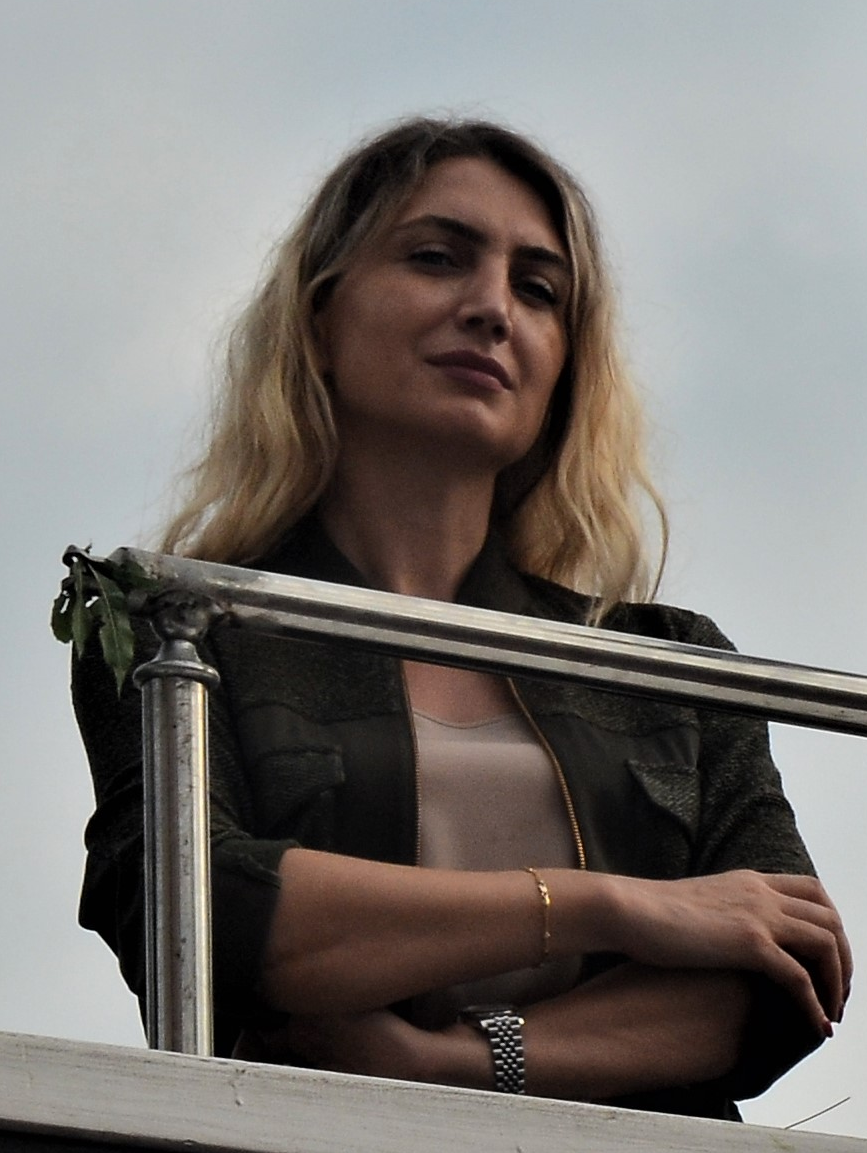
- İmamoğlu in 2019
- Born: Dilek Kaya; 18 November 1974 (age 51); Vakfıkebir, Trabzon Province, Turkey
- Education: Istanbul University (BA); Anadolu University (BA); Kadir Has University (MA); Istanbul Arel University (PhD)
- Alma mater: Istanbul University; Anadolu University; Kadir Has University; Istanbul Arel University
- Occupations: Academic • author • women's rights and disability rights activist
- Years active: 1995–present
- Known for: Founder and leader of the Büyüt Hayallerini scholarship project Recipient of the Şükrü Sürmen Awareness Award (2014)
- Political party: New Party (since 2026); Republican People's Party (until 2026)
- Spouse: Ekrem İmamoğlu (m. 1995)
- Children: 3
- Awards: Şükrü Sürmen Awareness Award (2014)
- Website: dilekimamoglu.com

Dilek Kaya İmamoğlu (born 18 November 1974) is a Turkish academic, author and activist. She is the wife of Ekrem İmamoğlu, the mayor of Istanbul and the Republican People's Party (CHP) presidential nominee for 2028.

== Career ==
İmamoğlu has worked as a lecturer, teaching courses on social responsibility and community service. In 2023, she published the book Cam Işığı Kes(e)mez: Cam Tavan Sendromu ve Kurumsal Bağlılık Üzerine Bir Değerlendirme (Glass Does Not Block the Light: An Evaluation on Glass Ceiling Syndrome and Organizational Commitment), based on her master's thesis. The royalties from the book are donated to the "Büyüt Hayallerini" scholarship project.

== Early life and education ==
Dilek Kaya was born on 18 November 1974 in Vakfıkebir, Trabzon Province, the youngest of ten siblings. She completed her undergraduate degree in Tourism Management at Istanbul University and later obtained a second bachelor's degree in Public Finance from Anadolu University.

She earned a master’s degree in Public Administration from Kadir Has University with a thesis on the “Glass Ceiling Syndrome”. In 2022 she received her PhD from Istanbul Arel University with a dissertation on Generation Y leadership expectations.

Dilek İmamoğlu was born on 18 November 1974 in Vakfıkebir, Trabzon Province, to a family of Turkish origin. She completed her primary education in Trabzon before moving to Istanbul for higher education. İmamoğlu earned a Bachelor of Arts in Tourism from Istanbul University and a second BA in Public Finance from Anadolu University. She later obtained a Master of Arts in Public Administration from Kadir Has University in 2016, with a thesis titled "The Relationship Between Glass Ceiling Syndrome and Organizational Commitment: A Research on Female Employees." İmamoğlu completed her PhD in Public Administration at Istanbul Arel University in 2022, focusing on "The Expectations of Generation Y from Leadership, the Impact of Democratic and Authoritarian Leadership Styles on Integrated Development."

== Career ==
As an academic, İmamoğlu has served as a lecturer at Istanbul Arel University, teaching courses on social responsibility. Her scholarly work emphasizes gender equality in the workplace and leadership dynamics. As an author, she published Cam Işığı Kes(e)mez through Hümanist Kitap Yayıncılık, a book that explores women's societal barriers based on her master's thesis; all royalties are donated as scholarships for female university students.

Imamoglu is a prominent activist for women's rights and disability awareness. In 2014, she collaborated with the Turkey Spinal Cord Paralysis Association, spending a day in a wheelchair to highlight accessibility challenges, earning the Şükrü Sürmen Awareness Award. She founded and leads the Büyüt Hayallerini scholarship project under the Istanbul Foundation, launched in March 2021, which has provided bursaries to thousands of girls and female university students through book sales and donations, including the anthology İlham Veren Adımlar. In October 2019, she was featured on the cover of Madame Figaro Turkey as the "First Lady of Istanbul."

== Activism ==
Dilek İmamoğlu, accompanied by Semra Çetinkaya, Vice President of the Spinal Cord Paralytics Association of Turkey, traveled around Istanbul in a wheelchair for a day "to feel the difficulties experienced by the disabled and to raise awareness". In 2014, she won the Şükrü Sürmen Award by the Spinal Cord Paralytics Association of Turkey for her "awareness raising activities for disabled people".

She played a prominent role in the protests following her husband’s arrest in 2025.

İmamoğlu is actively involved in initiatives focusing on women's rights, disability awareness, and children's education. In 2014, she participated in a campaign with the Turkey Spinal Cord Injury Association, spending a day in a wheelchair to raise awareness about disabilities. For this, she received the Şükrü Sürmen Awareness Award. Since 2021, she has led the Büyüt Hayallerini (Grow Your Dreams) project under the Istanbul Foundation, providing scholarships to female university students and organizing inspirational events.

=== Istanbul municipal elections ===
On 31 March 2019, during the Istanbul mayoral elections, posts were shared on social media comparing her photos with Semiha Yıldırım, the wife of AK Party candidate Binali Yıldırım. She said: "I don't think such posts are well-intentioned. If they think they are insulting or flattering, they should know that they are insulting me too. Because when I look at Ms. Semiha Yıldırım's photo, I see my own mother, my own sister. This is their preference. Therefore, I do not find this post in good faith at all." Semiha Yıldırım thanked Dilek for this response.

=== Women's rights ===
In October 2019, İmamoğlu was featured on the cover of Madame Figaro Turkey under the title "First Lady of Istanbul". In January 2020, Dilek İmamoğlu, together with Selvi Kılıçdaroğlu, the wife of CHP Chairman Kemal Kılıçdaroğlu, attended the theater event of the book 'Devran' written by former HDP Chairman Selahattin Demirtaş. The meeting was criticized by President Recep Tayyip Erdoğan and Nationalist Movement Party Chairman Devlet Bahçeli.

In August 2020, Imamoğlu posted a video on her social media account in support of the Istanbul Convention with the hashtag "#IstanbulCovenantLives". For the International Day of the Girl Child in October 2020, Istanbul Metropolitan Municipality introduced a book titled Brave Girls' Companions (Turkish: Cesur Kızlara Yol Arkadaşları), written by Aslıhan Dağıstanlı Aysev, featuring the stories of 30 Turkish women. In 2024 she wrote a book about the difficulties faced by businesswomen.

== Personal life ==
On 18 November 1995, Dilek Kaya married Ekrem İmamoğlu and the couple have three children, Mehmet Selim (b. 1997), Semih (b. 2005) and Beren (b. 2011).
