= Sadi Güven =

Turkish judge

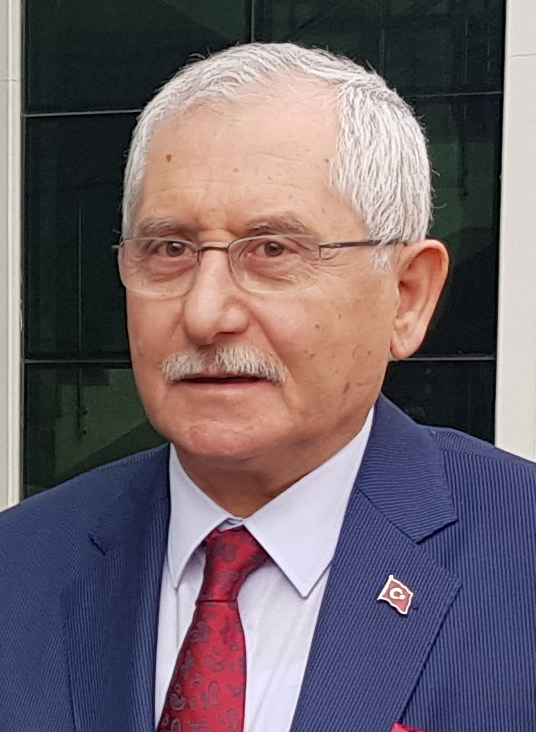

15th President of the Supreme Electoral Council
- In office 24 January 2013 – 24 January 2020
- Vice President: Turan Karakaya; Erhan Çiftçi
- Preceded by: Ali Em
- Succeeded by: Muharrem Akkaya

Personal details
- Born: 24 June 1955 (age 71) Dursunbey, Balıkesir, Turkey
- Education: Istanbul University

Sadi Güven (born 24 June 1955) is a Turkish former judge who served as the 15th President of the Supreme Electoral Council of Turkey from 2013 to 2020.

== Early life and career ==
Güven was born on 24 June 1955 in Dursunbey, Balıkesir and graduated from Istanbul University Faculty of Law in 1978. He became a candidate to become a judge in Istanbul. He served as a judge in the districts of Narman, İslahiye, Malkara, Fethiye and Ankara. He also served as the President of the Ankara Court of Commerce and served as the Deputy Undersecretary to the Ministry of Justice between 19 April 2005 and 13 July 2008. On 13 July 2008, he was elected as a member of the Court of Cassation. On 24 January 2013, he succeeded Ali Em as the President of the Supreme Electoral Council of Turkey.

== See also ==
- List of Turkish civil servants
