= Nationality law of North Macedonia =

North Macedonia Citizenship Act

Parliament of North Macedonia
- Long title: An Act relating to citizenship of North Macedonia
- Enacted by: Government of North Macedonia
- Status: Current legislation

The Nationality law of North Macedonia is governed by the Constitution of the Republic of North Macedonia (article 4) of 1991 and the Law on Citizenship of the Republic of North Macedonia (Macedonian: Закон за државјанството на Република Северна Македонија, Albanian: Ligji për shtetësinë e Republikës së Maqedonisë së Veriut) of 1992 (with changes made in various years through to 2019). The citizenship of North Macedonia is based primarily on the principle of Jus sanguinis. In other words, one usually acquires citizenship of North Macedonia if a parent is a national of North Macedonia, irrespective of place of birth.

== Citizenship by Constitution ==
According to the Constitution of the Republic of North Macedonia:

"Citizens of the Republic of North Macedonia have citizenship of the Republic of North Macedonia. A subject of the Republic of North Macedonia may neither be deprived of citizenship, nor expelled or extradited to another state. Citizenship of the Republic of North Macedonia is regulated by law."

== Acquisition of Citizenship of the Republic of North Macedonia ==
Citizenship of the Republic of North Macedonia is acquired by:

- 1) Origin
- 2) Birth in the territory of the Republic of North Macedonia
- 3) Naturalization

=== By Origin ===
A child acquires citizenship of the Republic of North Macedonia by origin if:

- 1) At the time of her/his birth both parents are nationals of the Republic of North Macedonia;
- 2) At the time of her/his birth one of the parents is a national of the Republic of North Macedonia, while the child is born in the Republic of North Macedonia, if the parents have not determined by mutual consent that the child acquires citizenship of the other parent and
- 3) At the time of her/his birth one of the parents is a national of the Republic of North Macedonia, while the other parent is unknown or holds unknown citizenship, or respectively she/he is stateless, and the child is born abroad.

An adopted child acquires also citizenship of the Republic of North Macedonia by origin in the case of full adoption when both of her/his adoptive parents are nationals of the Republic of North Macedonia or when one of her/his adoptive parents is a national of the Republic of North Macedonia.

==== Child born abroad by parent citizen of North Macedonia ====
A child born abroad one of whose parents at the time of her/his birth is a national of the Republic of North Macedonia while the other is a foreign national, acquires citizenship of the Republic of North Macedonia by origin if she/he has been reported for registration as a national of the Republic of North Macedonia before reaching 18 years of age or if before reaching 18 years of age she/he has settled permanently in the Republic of North Macedonia together with her/his parent who is a national of the Republic of North Macedonia. In the case of a lawsuit over the custody of a child, the citizenship shall be acquired after the court decision has gone into effect.

Citizenship of the Republic of North Macedonia may be acquired under the requirements of paragraph 1 of this Article by a person who has not been reported by both parents and who has reached 18 years of age, if she/he submits an application for registration in the citizenship of the Republic of North Macedonia before reaching 23 years of age.

The application of paragraphs 1 and 2 of this Article is submitted to the body competent for keeping the registries in which the birth of the child is additionally registered or to a diplomatic-consular mission of the Republic of North Macedonia abroad. The child who acquires citizenship of the Republic of North Macedonia in the sense of Article 4 of this law and paragraphs 1 and 2 of this Article is considered a national of the Republic of North Macedonia from the moment of her/his birth.

=== By Birth in the Territory of the Republic of North Macedonia ===
Citizenship of the Republic of North Macedonia is acquired by a child who is found or born in the territory of the Republic of North Macedonia whose parents are unknown, or with unknown citizenship or without citizenship.

The citizenship of the Republic of North Macedonia of the child of paragraph 1 of this Article shall cease if it has been established that her/his parents are foreign nationals before she/he has reached 15 years of age.

=== By Naturalization ===
An alien who has submitted an application for admission into citizenship of the Republic of North Macedonia may acquire citizenship of the Republic of North Macedonia by naturalization, if he fulfils the following requirements:

- 1) To have reached 18 years of age;
- 2) Until the submission of the application to have been legally and continuously residing in the territory of the Republic of North Macedonia for at least 8 years;
- 3) To have a residence and a permanent source of funds for existence to the level that provides material and social security under conditions determined by law;
- 4) Is not punished with imprisonment of at least one year in Republic of North Macedonia and the country of his original nationality,
- 5) There should be no criminal proceedings instigated against him in the state of his nationality or in the Republic of North Macedonia;
- 6) Knowledge of the Macedonian language, to the extent that it can easily be understood by the community;
- 7) The applicant isn't prohibited to reside in the Republic of North Macedonia;
- 8) His admission to citizenship of the Republic of North Macedonia does not threaten the security and defense of the Republic of North Macedonia;
- 9) To sign an oath that will be a loyal citizen of the Republic of North Macedonia;
- 10) To have a release from his foreign citizenship or a proof that he will obtain a release if he is admitted into the citizenship of the Republic of North Macedonia.

== Loss of citizenship ==
Citizenship of the Republic of North Macedonia could be lost by self revocation or could be revoked by the Government of North Macedonia.

== Dual citizenship ==
North Macedonia permits dual nationality.

== Visa requirements ==
Visa requirements for citizens of North Macedonia

In 2023/2024, citizens of North Macedonia had visa-free or visa on arrival access to 127 countries and territories, ranking the North Macedonian passport 39th in the world according to the .

== See also ==
- Identity card of North Macedonia
- List of honorary citizens of towns and cities in North Macedonia
