= İmam Taşçıer =

Kurdish politician in Turkey

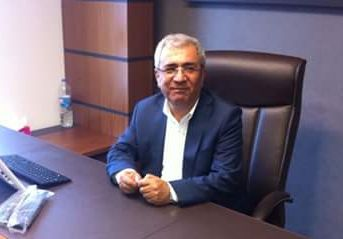

Member of the Grand National Assembly of Turkey
- In office June 2015 – November 2015
- In office November 2015 – June 2018
- In office June 2018 – May 2023

Personal details
- Born: 1 January 1959 (age 67) Bismil
- Citizenship: Turkish
- Party: HDP

İmam Taşçıer (1 January 1959, Bismil, Turkey) is a Kurdish politician of the Peoples' Democratic Party (HDP) and member of the Grand National Assembly of Turkey.

== Political career ==
İmam Taşçıer was elected to the Turkish Parliament representing the HDP for Diyarbakır in the Parliamentary elections June 2015 and re-elected in the snap elections of November 2015 and the parliamentary elections of June 2018. He encouraged the Turkish Government led by the Justice and Development Party (AKP) to release Kurdish prisoners, recognizing Kurdish rights in Turkey and establishing good relations with the Syrian Kurds in exchange for Kurdish votes for the Istanbul mayoral elections on the 23 June 2019.

=== Legal prosecution ===
Taşçıer was detained twice during his political career. Once together with twelve politicians of the HDP including the party co-chairs Selahattin Demirtaş and Figen Yüksekdağ on the 4 November 2016 but released shortly after. Nevertheless, he was prosecuted for allegedly having spread terror propaganda during the curfew of Sur in 2015. The prosecution demanded 23 years at time. Then he was again detained for a few hours in January 2017, due to investigation for insulting the Turkish President Recep Tayyip Erdogan.

== Personal life ==
İmam Taşçıer grew up in the village Yukarısalat in Bismil District, Diyarbakır Province and is a teacher. He is married and has two children.
