= Yukarısalat, Bismil =

Village in Diyarbakır Province, Turkey

Yukarısalat
- Neighbourhood
- Location in Turkey
- Coordinates: 37.842°N 40.896°E
- Country: Turkey
- Province: Diyarbakır
- District: Bismil
- Population (2022): 1,734
- Time zone: UTC+3 (TRT)

Yukarısalat (Kurdish: Selet) is a neighbourhood of the municipality and district of Bismil, Diyarbakır Province, Turkey. Its population is 1,734 (2022). Before the 2013 reorganisation, it was a town (belde).

It is populated by Kurds. The village was depopulated in the 1990s.

== Notable people ==
- İmam Taşçıer
