= Alinur Aktaş =

Turkish politician (born 1970)

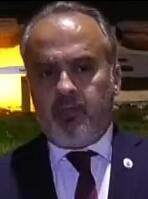
- Alinur Aktaş in 2023

Mayor of Bursa
- In office 2 November 2017 – 5 April 2024
- Preceded by: Recep Altepe
- Succeeded by: Mustafa Bozbey

Mayor of İnegöl
- In office 28 March 2004 – 2 November 2017
- Preceded by: Alper Taban
- Succeeded by: Hikmet Şahin

Personal details
- Born: 25 October 1970 (age 55) İnegöl, Bursa
- Party: Justice and Development Party

Alinur Aktaş (born 1970, in İnegöl, Turkey) is a Turkish politician in the AKP and was the Mayor of Bursa from 2017 to 2024.

== Personal life ==
He was born in 1970, in the İnegöl district of the Bursa Province. After graduating from primary school and high school in İnegöl, he graduated from Uludağ University in Bursa. Alinur Aktaş is married and is also a father to two children.

== Politics ==
His political life began as a member of AKP. He was elected as the Mayor of İnegöl in the 28 March 2004 elections. During his time being mayor, İnegöl became the second biggest city of the Southern Marmara region. After the resignation of Bursa Mayor Recep Altepe, Alinur Aktaş was elected to be his successor. He is famous for putting himself on multiple payrolls by appointing himself as the president of every city council owned company.
