= SPoD =

LGBTI+ association in Turkey

Social Policy, Gender Identity and Sexual Orientation Studies Association
- Sosyal Politika, Cinsiyet Kimliği ve Cinsel Yönelim Çalışmaları Derneği
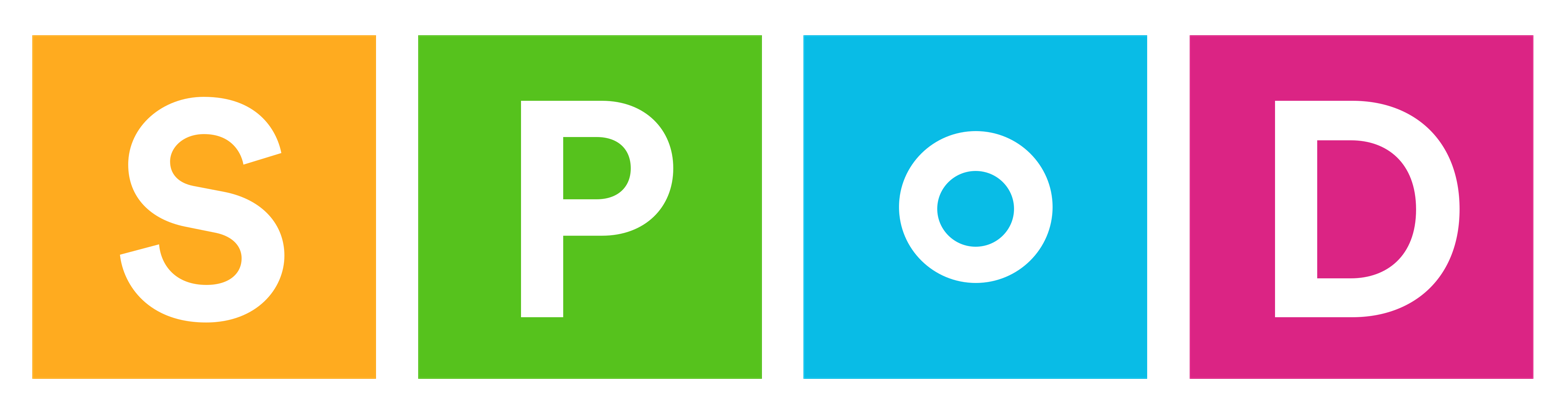
- Abbreviation: SPoD
- Members: 400
- Volunteers: 80
- Website: https://spod.org.tr/
- Remarks: "Gökkuşağının altında adil, eşit ve özgür bir dünya" (tr) "A fair, equal and free world under the rainbow"

Social Policy, Gender Identity and Sexual Orientation Studies Association (Turkish: Sosyal Politika, Cinsiyet Kimliği ve Cinsel Yönelim Çalışmaları Derneği), abbreviated as SPoD, is an LGBTQ+ studies organisation based in Istanbul, established by a group of academicians, legal experts, and activists in 2011. It does rights based and service oriented activities, for which it is locally, regionally and internationally recognized. It focuses primarily on social and economic inequality.

== Aim ==
SPoD remarks that they have started their journey with the dream of a fair, equal and just world under the rainbow, by contributing to social policy development in Turkey so that LGBT people do not experience oppression regarding their gender identities or sexual orientations.

In addition to the advocacy work it carries out for this purpose, SPoD aims to set an example for public institutions by developing service models for LGBT communities, to eliminate all forms of discrimination within these institutions, and to provide services for LGBT people in the long term through public and private sector collaborations.

== Activities ==
SPoD provides legal, social and psychological consultancy to LGBTI+ people, follows up on campaign cases, provides training to mental health experts, lawyers, institutions and municipalities, conducts academic research, organizes seminars, panels, politics and activism schools and election campaigns. It creates support groups, holds advocacy meetings, and carries out monitoring and reporting activities.

SPoD carries out all these studies with its professional employees, volunteers and expert networks.

== Access to Law and Justice ==
The Center for Access to Law and Justice provides free legal consultancy to support LGBTI+ people's access to justice, and continues its litigation efforts by campaigning against rights violations. Moreover, it produces legal content on the LGBTI+ field and organizes trainings and events with its Legal Team consisting of lawyers, academicians and law school students.

=== Legal Consultation ===
SPoD carries out litigation studies and consultancy services through the Access to Law and Justice Area Coordinator, Legal Team and Lawyer Network. The people who can benefit from the ongoing free legal consultancy are, people who face violations of their rights due to their LGBTI+ identity, or LGBTI+ people who face difficulties in accessing justice even if they are not subjected to rights violations due to their identity, and LGBTI+ people living with HIV.

There is a Lawyer Network consisting of lawyers who participate in the Lawyer Training titled "National and International Legislation and Jurisprudence on LGBTI+ Rights", organized by SPoD every year since 2012. Thanks to this network, SPoD is able to maintain solidarity and information exchange with expert lawyers from various parts of Turkey, especially Istanbul.

== Psychosocial support ==
Within the scope of the Psychosocial Support Area, where support mechanisms for the needs of LGBTI+ people are created, activities including psychological support guidance, conversations, verbal and written consultancy, training and workshops, supervision and self-care workshops are carried out.

Within the Psychosocial Support Area, there are LGBTI+ Counseling Line, Distanceless Talks, Social Service Team, Psychologist Team, Social Workers Network and Psychologist Network.

=== Psychological Support ===
SPoD supports everyone who identifies as LGBTI+ to access mental health services and receive reliable support without discrimination.

Psychological support is provided to LGBTI+ people through the Psychologist Network, which consists of semi-volunteer psychotherapists who attend the Mental Health Workshops titled "Handling Applications Related to Gender Identity and Sexual Orientation" and continue regular peer supervision and supervision work. In addition, it can also make referrals to psychiatrists as a result of the evaluation.

=== LGBTI+ Consultation Hotline ===
The LGBTI+ Consultation Hotline has been serving since 2017 to provide accurate, up-to-date and reliable information for questions and problems focused on gender identity and sexual orientation.

LGBTI+ Consultation Hotline, run by volunteer peer counselors who receive comprehensive training and regular supervision from SPoD, provides LGBTI+ clients with information on discrimination and violence based on gender identity and sexual orientation, sexual health and about sexually transmitted infections, gender-affirming process, military service exemption process and social service institutions. It provides emotional support on issues such as coming out, peer bullying, family relationships and relationship difficulties.

Clients who apply to the LGBTI+ Consultation Hotline are directed to experts in SPoD's relevant fields of work in legal consultancy, psychological support and social service, in line with their needs and demands.

Providing anonymous service in Turkish, the LGBTI+ Consultation Hotline provides free service every weekday between 12.00 and 18.00, excluding public holidays.

=== Social Services ===
The Social Service Unit was established in 2018, to direct applications made reaching the LGBTI+ Hotline to local institutions, associations and organizations, and to provide case support to social workers in the field on gender identity and sexual orientation.

The Social Work Unit is creating a Social Workers Network for social workers who have worked and continue to work with LGBTI+ clients and therefore cases. Through this network, which includes volunteer social workers from different cities of Turkey, applications coming to the LGBTI+ Hotline are directed to the relevant institutions. SPoD provides information on HIV/AIDS, guidance on social assistance, gender adaptation process, coming out to one's family, violence and Counseling is provided on issues such as abuse.

== Academy and advocacy ==
=== Academic Activities ===
The Academic Studies Unit aims to contribute to the academic knowledge in Turkey from the perspective of gender and queer theory, and aims to compile studies on LGBTI+ movements and subjects and combine them under a single scope.

It organizes Spring Seminars, which aim to bring together academics and students working in this field; provides academic consultancy to institutions, academics and students; contributes to relevant academic publications.

=== HIV Activism ===
The aim of the HIV Studies Unit, which was established in 2020, was determined to empower subjects in line with the experiences and needs of LGBTI+ people living with HIV and to produce policies for the discrimination they experience, and its work began to be developed on this basis.

Firstly, efforts were made to increase HIV awareness within the association by focusing on improving the capacities of other working areas and units within SPoD. Thus, human rights violations and various discriminations suffered by LGBTI+ people living with HIV have become one of the most important agendas of SPoD, and all studies have begun to transform to include LGBTI+ people living with HIV more effectively.

=== Political Participation ===
The Political Participation Unit, which had been operating as an important unit since the establishment of SPoD but had been inactive for a while, started operating again in 2020.

The unit aims to increase the capacity of LGBTI+ people in local and central decision-making mechanisms, to create safe spaces where they can talk about current politics, to make visible the expectations of the political institution and people and institutions in decision-making positions, to introduce and strengthen LGBTI+ rights within practical politics. It organizes meetings, focus group studies, workshops, trainings, carries out campaigns, and carries out monitoring and reporting studies in order to ensure mainstreaming through channels.
