= Mevlüt Uysal =

Turkish politician and lawyer

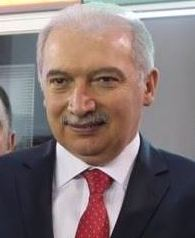

31st Mayor of Istanbul
- In office September 28, 2017 – April 17, 2019
- Preceded by: Kadir Topbaş
- Succeeded by: Ekrem İmamoğlu

Mayor of Başakşehir
- In office March 29, 2009 – September 28, 2017
- Preceded by: District established
- Succeeded by: Yasin Kartoğlu

Personal details
- Born: 1966 (age 59–60) Alanya, Antalya, Turkey
- Party: Justice and Development Party
- Education: Istanbul University Faculty of Law

Mevlüt Uysal (born 1966, Alanya) is a Turkish politician and lawyer who was the mayor of Istanbul Metropolitan Municipality from September 2017 to April 2019.

After completing the primary and middle school in Antalya, he studied law at Istanbul University and graduated in 1988.

Uysal worked as a freelance lawyer and has been engaged in active politics. He co-founded the district organization of Justice and Development Party (AKP) in Küçükçekmece, Istanbul Province. Following the merger of Bahçeşehir and Başakşehir neighborhoods forming the Başakşehir district, he was elected district mayor of Başakşehir in the 2009 local elections on March 29. He was re-elected in the 2014 local elections.

He was nominated as the Mayor of Istanbul from the AKP after Mayor Kadir Topbaş resigned from his post on September 22, 2017. Uysal was elected the new mayor in the third round in the Council of Istanbul Metropolitan Municipality on September 28, 2017.

Uysal is married and father of four.

Political offices
Preceded by Kadir Topbaş	Mayor of Istanbul; 28 September 2017 – 17 April 2019	Succeeded by Ekrem İmamoğlu
Preceded by District established	Mayor of Başakşehir; 29 March 2009 – 28 September 2017	Succeeded by Yasin Kartoğlu
