= Recep Altepe =

Turkish politician and a mayor of Bursa

Mayor of Bursa
- In office 29 March 2009 – 23 October 2017
- Preceded by: Hikmet Şahin
- Succeeded by: Alinur Aktaş

Mayor of Osmangazi
- In office 28 March 2004 – 29 March 2009
- Preceded by: Hilmi Şenalp
- Succeeded by: Mustafa Dündar

President of the Union of Municipalities of the Marmara Region
- In office 2009–2017

Personal details
- Born: 1959 (age 66–67) Bursa, Turkey
- Party: Justice and Development Party (AK Party)
- Other political affiliations: Welfare Party (Refah Partisi)
- Education: Gazi University

Recep Altepe (born 1959, Bursa, Turkey) is a Turkish politician and a former mayor of Bursa.

He graduated from the Department of Mechanical Engineering at Gazi University.

He began his political life with the Welfare Party.

In the 2004 local elections he was elected to the Osmangazi Municipality. In the 2009 local elections he was elected to the Bursa Metropolitan Municipality. He is a member of the Justice and Development Party (AK Party).

He is married with three children.

In 2009 he was elected president of the Union of Municipalities of the Marmara Region (UMMR), taking over from Mr Kadir Topbaş, Mayor of Istanbul.

In October 2009 the Turkish press claimed that he was devoting much of his energy to the development of the Uludağ resort.

He is also active in the Healthy Cities Association of Turkey.
