= Supreme Election Council (Turkey) =

Highest electoral authority in the Republic of Türkiye

- Yüksek Seçim Kurulu
- Interactive map of Supreme Election Council
- Established: 16 February 1950
- Jurisdiction: Turkey
- Location: Ankara
- Composition method: Legislative selection
- Authorised by: Constitution of Turkey
- Appeals to: Impossible after single term of objection to council itself within 48 hours of decision (election results); Impossible (all other decisions)
- Judge term length: 6 years (renewable)
- Number of positions: 7 regular, 4 substitute
- Annual budget: 146,808,000 TL (2016)
- Website: www.ysk.gov.tr

President
- Currently: Ahmet Yener
- Since: 26 January 2023 (3 years ago)

Deputy-president
- Currently: Ekrem Özübek
- Since: 26 January 2023 (3 years ago)

The Supreme Election Council (Turkish: Yüksek Seçim Kurulu; YSK) is the highest electoral authority in Turkey. It was established by the Deputies Election Law no. 5545 on 16 February 1950. After the 1960 coup, the Supreme Election Council gained constitutional authority by the Constitution of 1961. Its duty is to ensure that the principles and rules of the constitution are upheld.

The Supreme Election Council consists of a president, six members and four substitute members from the Court of Cassation and the Council of State judges.

== The Elections ==
Turkey is operated under a Presidential system of governance, with the presidential candidate required to get 50+1% of the popular vote. The election is counted and monitored by the Supreme Election Council (YSK), and during the election night, the information flows with the election watchdogs, such as Anka News Agency, and the state-run Anadolu Agency, which tries to estimate the election results before the public disclosure of them, and the news channels report on it.

=== Propaganda Broadcast Law ===
Any political party, to be competing in Turkish elections, has a right to use the state-run Turkish Radio and Television Corporation (TRT), with the date to be before elections, and selected in a lottery style, in the given amount of time to make propaganda for their own party.

=== Independence, and impartiality ===
Despite the election body's long-standing history of free and fair elections since the 90s, and healthy rulings, Freedom House doesn't recognize Turkey as a democracy, nor as free. Especially during the Recep Tayyip Erdoğan government, the Supreme Election Council is characterized by controversial referendums, democratic backsliding, and AK Party-friendly appointments. Organization for Security and Co-operation in Europe, which watches Turkish elections as per Turkey being a member, was concerned that the YSK was lacking transparency.
