= List of supermarket chains in Europe =

This is a list of supermarket chains in Europe.

The international brands with the most supermarkets are Carrefour, Coopérative U, Auchan and SPAR.

== Andorra ==
- Caprabo
- Carrefour
- Condis
- E.Leclerc
- Family Cash
- Système U

== Armenia ==
- Carrefour
- Parma Supermarket
- SAS Supermarket
- Tsiran
- 88 Supermarket
- MG
- Magnis
- Barev
- Kaiser
- Yerevan City
- Gurmenia
- Zovq

== Azerbaijan ==
- Al Market
- Araz Supermarket
- Bazarstore
- Bravo Supermarket
- Fresco Supermarket
- OBA Market
- SPAR

== Belarus ==
- Almi
- BelMarket
- Evroopt
- Korona

== Cyprus ==
- Alphamega Hypermarkets
- Athienitis Supermarket
- Sklavenitis
- E&S
- Lidl
- METRO
- MAS Supermarkets
- Olympic

== Denmark ==
=== Greenland ===
- Brugseni
- Pilersuisoq
- Pisiffik

== Faroe Islands ==
- Bónus (8 stores)
- Á (12 stores)
- FK (8 stores)
- Mylnan (4 stores)
- Miklagarður (1 store)
- Samkeyp (17 stores)

== Georgia ==
- Carrefour
- SPAR - 100 stores
- Ori Nabiji - mainly in Tbilisi

== Abkhazia ==
- Azanta
- Central Supermarkets
- Premium Supermarket

== Gibraltar ==
- Coviran
- Eroski
- Morrisons

== Guernsey ==
- Alliance
- Channel Islands Co-operative Society
- Iceland
- Marks & Spencer
- Waitrose
- Food Hall

== Isle of Man ==
- Co-op Food
- Tesco Superstore

== Jersey ==
- Checkers Food Stores
  - Checkers Supermarket
  - Checkers Xpress
- Co-op Food
- Costcutter
- Iceland
- Waitrose

== Kosovo ==
- Albi Market
- CONAD Kosova
- Elkos Trading Center (ETC)
- Interex
- KAM Market
- Maxi
- Meridian Express
- SPAR
- Viva
- Viva Fresh Store
- Landi star
- Planet Shopping Center
- Eli-Ab
- Emona Center
- Super Viva
- Kipper Market
- Durmart
- QTA
- Al-Trade
- Rina Market
- Albini Klinë
- Nora Market
- MyMarket
- Abi Center
- Lid Market
- Elira Shtime
- Vipros
- Bum Market

== Liechtenstein ==
- Coop
- Denner
- Migros
- Spar

== Malta ==
- Auchan (under the name of Pavi Supermarket)
- Carrefour (under the name of Towers Supermarket)
- Conad (under the name of Scotts Supermarket)
- Lidl
- SPAR

== Moldova ==
- Linella (23)
- Green Hills (11)
- Fidesco (10)
- Fourchette (10)
- Nr. 1 (7)
- IMC Market (6)
- Metro Cash and Carry (3)
- Velmart
- Kaufland (6)

== Montenegro ==
- HDL
- Aroma
- Idea
- VOLI
- Franca
- city Market

== North Macedonia ==
- Tinex
- KAM
- Viva Fresh
- Vero
- Reptil
- Kipper
- Zur
- Ramstore
- Zito

== Romania ==
- Lidl
- Kaufland
- Profi
- Carrefour
- Mega Image
- Rewe (Penny)
- Auchan
- Artima

== Turkey ==
=== Cooperative ===
- The Agricultural Credit Cooperatives of Turkey (Tarım Kredi Koop Bakkal, Tarım Kredi Koop Çiftçi Marketi, Tarım Kredi Kooperatif Market, Tarım Kredi Koop Gross, Tarım Kredi Sıfır Market)

=== National chains ===
- Anadolu (Ekomini, Kipa, Migros, Tansaş)
- Bim (Bim, File)
- Hakmar (Hakmar Express)
- Metro
- Tespo
- Yeni(A101, CarrefourSA)
- Yildiz (Bizim Toptan, Seç Market, Şok)

== See also ==
- List of hypermarkets in Europe
- List of supermarket chains
