= Tansaş =

Turkish supermarket chain

Tansaş Regulated Sales A.Ş.
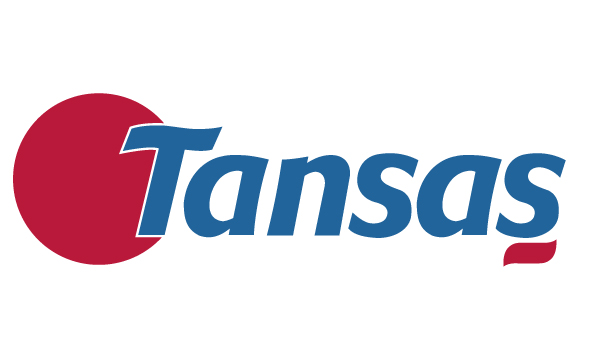
- Tansaş logo

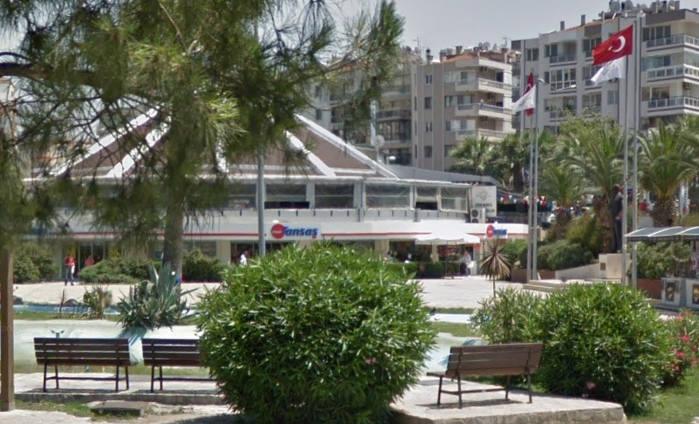
- Tansaş Maxi in Üçyol, İzmir
- Native name: Tansaş Tanzim Satışları A.Ş.
- Formerly: Tansa
- Company type: Public
- Traded as: BİST: TNSAS
- Industry: Retail
- Predecessor: Tansaş Alışveriş Merkezleri (1997-2016)
- Founded: 1973; 53 years ago
- Founder: İhsan Alyanak
- Defunct: 2016; 10 years ago
- Fate: Acquired by Migros
- Successor: Tansaş Gross (2024; 2 years ago)
- Headquarters: İzmir, Turkey
- Number of locations: 270 (2005)
- Areas served: Turkey
- Key people: Ahmet Piriştina (CEO)
- Brands: Tansaş Mini; Tansaş Maxi; Tansaş Toptan
- Services: Supermarket
- Parent: Migros
- Website: https://tansasgross.com.tr

Tansaş Tanzim Satışları A.Ş. is a Turkish supermarket chain, established in 1973 in İzmir. The company began as a municipal initiative to provide essential consumer goods at regulated prices, and later developed into a major retail brand in Turkey. It ceased operating under its original brand name in 2016, but the Tansaş name was reintroduced in 2024 with a warehouse club format aimed at budget-oriented consumers.

== History ==
=== Izmir Municipality ownership ===
Tansaş was established in 1973 under the leadership of then-İzmir mayor İhsan Alyanak. The initiative was designed to offer residents regulated prices on goods such as meat, fruits, vegetables and coal. It was launched under the name Tansa, an abbreviation of Tanzim Satışları (Regulated Sales), and operated under the municipality’s Mezbaha Müdürlüğü (Slaughterhouse Directorate). The first retail location opened in the Alsancak neighbourhood of İzmir. Due to increased demand, the initiative expanded and began using mobile sales units, including converted buses, to reach more residents. Initial products were largely sourced from Agricultural Sales Cooperatives (Tarım Satış Birlikleri).

In 1976, the dedicated Tanzim Satış (Regulated Sales) units were created with a separate municipal budget. In 1978, the company Tansaş was officially founded to support this growing retail network. Though the company was dissolved under martial law in 1983, retail operations continued under the Directorate of Regulated Sales (Tanzim Satışlar Müdürlüğü).

By 1984, the number of stores reached 26, prompting plans for formal corporate structuring. On 15 December 1986, the company Tansaş İzmir Büyükşehir Belediyesi İç ve Dış Ticaret A.Ş. (Tansaş İzmir Metropolitan Municipality Domestic and Foreign Trade S.A.) was officially established. Tansaş expanded significantly within the Aegean region and gradually established a nationwide presence.

By 1994, Tansaş had expanded to 86 locations, including 74 in İzmir and 12 in surrounding districts. During this period, Ahmet Piriştina served as general manager. In 1996, the company was privatized when the İzmir Metropolitan Municipality sold 32.98% its Tansaş shares via a public offering. This marked the beginning of its move towards a competitive retail model, alongside other large chains in Turkey like Migros, CarrefourSA, and BİM.

=== Doğuş Group ownership ===
In 1999, Doğuş Group acquired full ownership of Tansaş. The chain targeted middle- and lower-income consumer segments and maintained a strong regional identity, especially in İzmir and western Turkey. By the end of the 1990s, Tansaş had become the second-largest supermarket chain in Turkey.

In 2002, Tansaş expanded further through the acquisition of Makro and Uyum Markets.

=== Migros ownership ===
In 2005, Tansaş was acquired by Migros. At the time of the acquisition, Tansaş operated 270 stores nationwide. The brand continued to operate separately for several years.

In 2011, Migros ended Tansaş’s national expansion strategy. Stores outside the Aegean and Mediterranean regions were converted into Migros locations. After Migros was acquired by Anadolu Group in 2015, a decision was made to consolidate the two brands. As a result, Tansaş was phased out in 2016.

== Operations ==
=== Current store formats ===
==== Tansaş Gross ====
In 2024, Migros reintroduced the Tansaş brand with a warehouse-style retail model called "Tansaş Gross." This format focuses on large-format stores offering bulk items and basic household goods, structured to appeal to price-sensitive consumers.

The first store under this new format opened on 19 January 2024 in Istanbul’s Sultanbeyli district, within the Atlaspark Shopping Mall. The format includes departments such as bakery, butcher, deli, and fresh produce, and is positioned as a discount alternative within the broader Migros structure.

Tansaş Gross draws on the historical identity of the original Tansaş brand, while adopting a contemporary retail approach. The reintroduction primarily targets regions where Tansaş had previously built strong brand recognition, particularly in the Aegean.

== Slogans ==
Over the years, Tansaş used various slogans to reflect its evolving brand identity and market strategy.

- "Tansaş ile Müşteri İyi Gelecek İçin!" (The Customer is for a Better Future With Tansaş!) — 1973–2007
- "Süppper Marketim Tansaş!" (My Supperrrmarket, Tansaş!), "Paranızın Tam Karşılığı" (The Full Value for Your Money), "Tanzimden Satışa, Tansaş!" (From Regulation to Sales, Tansaş!) — 2007–2013
- "Sözünün Eri, Kalitenin Yeri, Tansaş!" (True to Its Word, Home of Quality, Tansaş!) — 2013–2016
- "Tam Bütçene Göre" (Just Right for Your Budget) — 2024
- "Tak İşe Seninle" (Tock to Work With You) / "Tansaş Her Yerde" (Tansaş is Everwhere) / "Tansaş’la Seninle" (With Tansaş With You) / "Tansaş Her Yerde Seninle" (Tansaş is Everywhere With You) — 2025
