= Kipa (supermarket) =

Supermarket chain in Turkey

Kipa Mass Marketing Trade A.Ş.
- Trade name: Kipa Kitle Pazarlama Ticaret A.Ş.
- Company type: Anonim Şirket
- Industry: Retail
- Founded: August 17, 1992; 33 years ago
- Headquarters: Çiğli, İzmir, Turkey
- Number of locations: 513 stores (2013)
- Area served: Turkey (20 cities)
- Key people: Tuncay Özilhan (chairman)
- Products: Supermarket, hypermarket
- Number of employees: 6,000
- Parent: Migros Türk (2017–present); Tesco (2003–2017)
- Website: kipakurumsal.com

Kipa, short for Kitle Pazarlama A.Ş., is a supermarket chain in Turkey, owned by Migros Türk since 2017. It was previously owned by the largest UK retailer, Tesco.

== History ==
=== Independent ownership ===
The original company, Kitle Pazarlama A.Ş., was founded in 1992 by a group of 100 investors, including notable figures such as Şinasi Ertan and renowned actor Metin Akpınar. The initiative was led by Ahmet Piriştina, the former General Manager of Tansaş, following his departure from the company. The first Kipa hypermarket was opened in Bornova, İzmir in November 1994. Soon after, additional locations were launched in the İzmir districts of Balçova and Çiğli. In 1997, Kipa shares began trading on the Istanbul Stock Exchange. In 1998, Kipa expanded outside İzmir by opening a store in Denizli. In 1999, after being elected Mayor of İzmir, Piriştina ended all ties with the company due to ethical considerations.

=== Tesco ownership ===
On 11 November 2003, British retail giant Tesco acquired a majority stake in Kipa, marking its entry into the Turkish market.

In September 2010, Tesco Extra began its operation in Turkey. Under Tesco's ownership, Kipa continued to grow, and in 2013, it launched the "Türkiye'nin Tadı" (Taste of Turkey) project, showcasing Turkish brands and products in 235 Tesco stores across the UK. Kipa used the standard Tesco retailing model, which meant that it still ran Tesco supermarkets, including a range of store sizes from Tesco hypermarkets to Tesco Express outlets. By 2013, it had 513 stores, with plans for continued strong growth. However, Tesco began restructuring its global operations in the mid-2010s. In 2015, it sold 10 stores in Ankara, Mersin, and Denizli to Beğendik for ₺40 million. In June 2016, Tesco announced it would sell Kipa to competitor Migros Türk.

=== Anadolu Group ownership ===
In 2017, Tesco sold 95.5% of Kipa shares to the Anadolu Group, the parent company of Migros Ticaret A.Ş. The sale was completed in February 2017. By 2018, all Kipa and Migros stores were merged under the Migros brand. This marked the end of Kipa as a standalone retail brand.

Kipa played a pivotal role in the modernization of Turkey’s retail industry, introducing hypermarket models and supporting local supply chains. Its integration into the Migros brand marked the consolidation of Turkey's retail landscape under fewer, larger entities.

== Operations ==
As of 29 November 2015, prior to its full acquisition by Anadolu Group, Kipa operated:

- 169 stores across 20 Turkish cities, including Istanbul, Ankara, and İzmir
- 31 shopping malls
- 3 fuel stations
- 1 distribution center located in Torbalı, İzmir, covering 240,000 m² of land with 41,000 m² of enclosed space

Kipa also held an autoproducer license granted by the Energy Market Regulatory Authority (EPDK), allowing it to generate its own electricity starting in 2009.
