= SandpiperCI =

Food company from the Channel Islands

- Type: Private
- Industry: Retail
- Founded: Le Riches Jersey (1818)
- Headquarters: Channel Islands, Gibraltar, Isle of Man
- Products: Grocery, General merchandise
- Website: sandpiperci.com

SandpiperCI is a retail and food and beverage operator based in the Channel Islands. It mostly operates franchises of British chain stores, such as Marks & Spencer, Costa Coffee, Burger King and Matalan (Note: As of May 2023), in British Crown Dependencies and Overseas Territories. It also operates an Apple retailer called iQ.

SandpiperCI was formed on 27 June 2007, after its predecessor CI Traders was sold to a private equity consortium comprising Duke Street Capital and Europa Capital for £260 million. CI Traders was formed in 2002 out of a merger between Le Riches Stores and the Ann Street Group. In 2016, the company ownership reverted to a Channel Islands consortium.

== Current operations ==
SandpiperCI consists of wholly owned operations trading as Checkers Xpress, Wine Warehouse, Le Cocq's Stores, Richards Newsagents & Post Office, The Gibraltar Bakery, and Liberty Wharf. Plus a number of other franchises: Marks & Spencer, Morrisons Daily, Iceland, Costa Coffee, Hotel Chocolat, Crew Clothing, Card Factory, iQ (an Apple reseller), Matalan, and Burger King.

=== Burger King ===
In January 2016, SandpiperCI announced a deal with Burger King to operate restaurants in the Channel Islands. The 60-seater restaurant at 41 The Parade, St Helier. This outlet was closed quietly at the beginning of 2025.

=== Card Factory ===
In 2019, SandpiperCI opened up three Card Factory stores in Jersey, Guernsey, and the Isle of Man.

=== Checkers and Checkers Xpress ===
Checkers was a small supermarket chain in the Channel Islands, which was operated by SandpiperCI. It was sold in 2011 to Waitrose. In 2017, SandpiperCI acquired the Costcutter stores which were then converted into Food Halls and Checkers Xpress. Checkers Xpress is SandpiperCI's wholly owned convenience and forecourt retailer with seven stores at key locations in both Jersey and Guernsey. These stores transferred into a separate company prior to being purchased by Morrisons to be converted to Morrisons Daily outlets during 2025.

=== Costa Coffee ===
SandpiperCI opened their first Costa Coffee in Jersey in 2008. The division operated a total of nine stores across Jersey, Guernsey and Gibraltar but the remaining 4 outlets were sold to a U.K. company at the start of 2025.

=== Crew Clothing ===
In January 2013, SandpiperCI acquired and opened Crew Clothing in St Helier, Jersey, followed by a 2nd store in Guernsey.

=== Hotel Chocolat ===
SandpiperCI acquired and opened Hotel Chocolat in 2011. They now operate 3 stores across Jersey, Guernsey, and Gibraltar.

=== Iceland ===
SandpiperCI opened their first Iceland store in Georgetown, Jersey in 2008. Since then, they have opened a further nine Iceland stores; five in Jersey along with four in Guernsey. These stores also transferred to Morrisons in 2024 with the final Iceland being converted in 2025. Iceland stores after this date will be in different locations and operated by Alliance Supermarkets.

=== iQ Apple Premium Reseller ===
SandpiperCI acquired the iQ franchise in Jersey and Guernsey in 2017 and opened a further store in the Isle of Man in 2020. They are the only Apple Premium Reseller in the Channel Islands and Isle of Man.

=== Le Cocq's Stores ===
Le Cocq's Stores were founded in Alderney in 1860 and were bought by SandpiperCI in September 2020. The chain is currently made up of two shops based in Le Huret, and Braye Harbour (known as Freezer Centre at The Cuttings). These stores are the only ones transferred to Morrisons which will retain their existing name.

=== Liberty Wharf ===
In 2018, SandpiperCI purchased Liberty Wharf shopping centre in St Helier, Jersey. Liberty Wharf is a shopping centre housed in a restored Victorian abattoir.

=== Marks & Spencer ===
The Marks & Spencer franchise has been operating for at least 50 years. Sandpiper operate the Jersey Marks & Spencer. In Guernsey the franchise is operated by Creaseys and has done so since 1967 when the St Michael brand opened on the island.

=== Matalan ===
SandpiperCI acquired the Matalan franchise and opened its first stores in Liberty Wharf, Jersey, and St Martins, Guernsey, in March 2021.

=== Morrisons Daily ===
In February 2018, the British supermarket chain, Morrisons, announced a new wholesale supply initiative with SandpiperCI, which included a number of their 43 stores being re-branded as "Morrisons Daily" and selling Morrisons' own-brand products. By 2022, SandpiperCI had converted 19 of their stores in the Channel Islands to the Morrisons Daily format, including the former Benest's of Millbrook store at Lisbon House, which was run by the Benest family for more than 100 years.

=== Richards Newsagents & Post Office ===
SandpiperCI acquired Richards Newsagents & Post Office in Alderney in 2022.

=== The Gibraltar Bakery ===
The Gibraltar Bakery is a bakery and coffee shop located at Grand Casemates Square, Gibraltar serving pastries, croissants, and cakes. The Gibraltar Bakery was formally run as a franchise of The Cornish Bakery, a British chain founded in 1994 as Pasty Presto, which has more than 30 outlets in the UK.

=== The Wine Warehouse ===
Since 1995, SandpiperCI operates the largest off-license chain in the islands under the name of Wine Warehouse with 14 stores in Jersey and five located in Guernsey. The majority of Wine Warehouses can be found as sections within their other branded grocery stores, but separate stand-alone Wine Warehouses can be found at Five Oaks in St Saviour and next to Morrisons Daily Benest store at Lisbon House in Millbrook.This brand was also transferred to Morrisons with Iceland, Checkers Xpress and the existing Morrisons Daily outlets.

=== Others ===
MMD Shipping Services, a Portsmouth-based business that specialises in stevedoring, warehousing and distribution services, publishing, brewing, baking, and Channel Rentals (company and residential technology hire) figure amongst the group's other activities. These divisions are now run separately.

The property division (formally COMPROP) is responsible for the acquisition and development of commercial and residential property which is then sold or retained for letting.

== Former operations ==
=== Large supermarkets ===
In October 2010 it was announced that contracts had been exchanged for the sale of the three major Checkers supermarkets, at Redhouse's and Rue des Pres in Jersey and Admiral Park in Guernsey, to Waitrose. The deal was subject, amongst other things, to the approval of the Jersey Competition Regulatory Authority. Financial details of the transaction were not disclosed.

=== Safeway ===
Safeway (Channel Islands) logo

Between 2005 and 2011, CI Traders/ Sandpiper CI operated the Safeway stores in Guernsey and Jersey. When Safeway was bought by Morrisons, the decision was made to sell the Safeway Channel Islands stores, where the stores joined SandpiperCI until they were purchased by Waitrose and converted.

=== CI Hospitality ===
CI Hospitality operates in excess of 80 pubs across the islands. The hospitality division is now run separately as Liberation Group.

=== Cimandis ===
A foodservice wholesale and distribution business, Cimandis, was sold to Bidvest 3663 in 2015. As of 2019, the business continues to be branded Cimandis Foodservice.

=== Gourmet Burger Kitchen ===
In 2013, SandpiperCI operated two Gourmet Burger Kitchen restaurants in Guernsey and Jersey.

=== L'Abeille ===
L'Abeille, a French soft drinks manufacturer based in Nantes, was bought by a Jersey brewer in 1989 and merged to form Channel Islands Traders in 2002. The business was sold in 2009.

=== Pet and Home Discount Centre ===
In 2014, Sandpiper started its Pet and Home Discount Centre branded 'shop-in-shops'. Three stores opened in Jersey, and one opened in Guernsey. All stores quietly closed the same year. The 'shop-in-shop' areas that Pet and Home Discount Centre took up now house Checkers Xpress, Iceland, and Wine Warehouse stores.
