= İzmir Opera House =

- Opera İzmir

General information
- Status: On hold
- Architectural style: Modern architecture
- Location: Mavişehir Mahallesi, Karşıyaka, İzmir, Turkey
- Coordinates: 38.4689°N 27.0831°E
- Groundbreaking: 25 September 2018
- Construction stopped: May 2023
- Owner: İzmir Metropolitan Municipality

Technical details
- Floor area: 73,800 square metres (794,000 sq ft)
- Grounds: 25,000 square metres (270,000 sq ft)

Design and construction
- Architect: Mehmet Kütükçüoğlu

Other information
- Parking: 525 vehicles (originally)

İzmir Opera House (Turkish: Opera İzmir) is a opera house and performing arts center under construction in İzmir, Turkey. The construction of the building started in 2018 and is on hold since May 2023. When the building will be completed, it will become the first dedicated opera house in Turkey.

== History ==
The architectural project of Opera İzmir was determined by a contest organized by İzmir Metropolitan Municipality. The results were announced in August 2010. 177 works participated in the project contest. The team led by Mehmet Kütükçüoğlu won the contest, and a contract for application project was signed in April 2012. The project was announced to be completed in October 2013, and tender documents had been prepared. The construction area of the building was bought by the Metropolitan Municipality from Karşıyaka Municipality in 2015. 29,8 million Turkish lira was paid for expropriation. The same year, it was announced that the construction tender would not be done as the delivery of application project was delayed. Construction tender was organized on 15 December 2016, however it was repeated on 26 April 2017 as the bids were not deemed to be valid. The tender was won by a Turkish-Austrian consortium, Çağdan Engineering and Waagner-Biro, for 429 million Turkish lira. However, the Public Procurements Authority evaluated the objections and cancelled the tender in August 2017. As a result of the litigation started by the consortium, The 1st Administrative Court of Ankara cancelled the cancellation decision in December 2017.

The groundbreaking ceremony was held on 25 September 2018. Waagner-Biro AG withdrew from the consortium in November 2019, citing the Turkish economic crisis and increasing steel prices. The construction was 45% completed as of October 2021. Çağdan Engineering unilaterally cancelled the contract in May 2023. A new construction tender is planned to be done.

Cemil Tugay, the incumbent mayor of Izmir, announced in January 2026 that the project would be revised for economical reasons and a tender for completion would be granted after an approval from the Ministry of Environment, Urbanisation and Climate Change. The construction project was reportedly updated in October 2026 and separated into two parts: the first comprising the open areas and infrastructure around the building and the second being the building itself.

When completed, Opera İzmir will be the first dedicated, specifically constructed opera house of Turkey.

== Architecture ==
Opera İzmir is being constructed on a 25,000 m^{2} land in Mavişehir neighbourhood of Karşıyaka. The building would originally consist of nine blocks and its total floor space will be 73,800 m^{2}. The building will host a main hall for 1,435 people, a small hall for 437 people and an open performance hall for 350 people. Originally, there would also be a closed parking space for 525 vehicles; however it was later revised down to a surface parking space for 199 vehicles and a closed parking space for 135 vehicles for the first part of the project, and a closed parking space for 155 vehicles for second part of the project.
