= List of supermarket chains in Northern Cyprus =

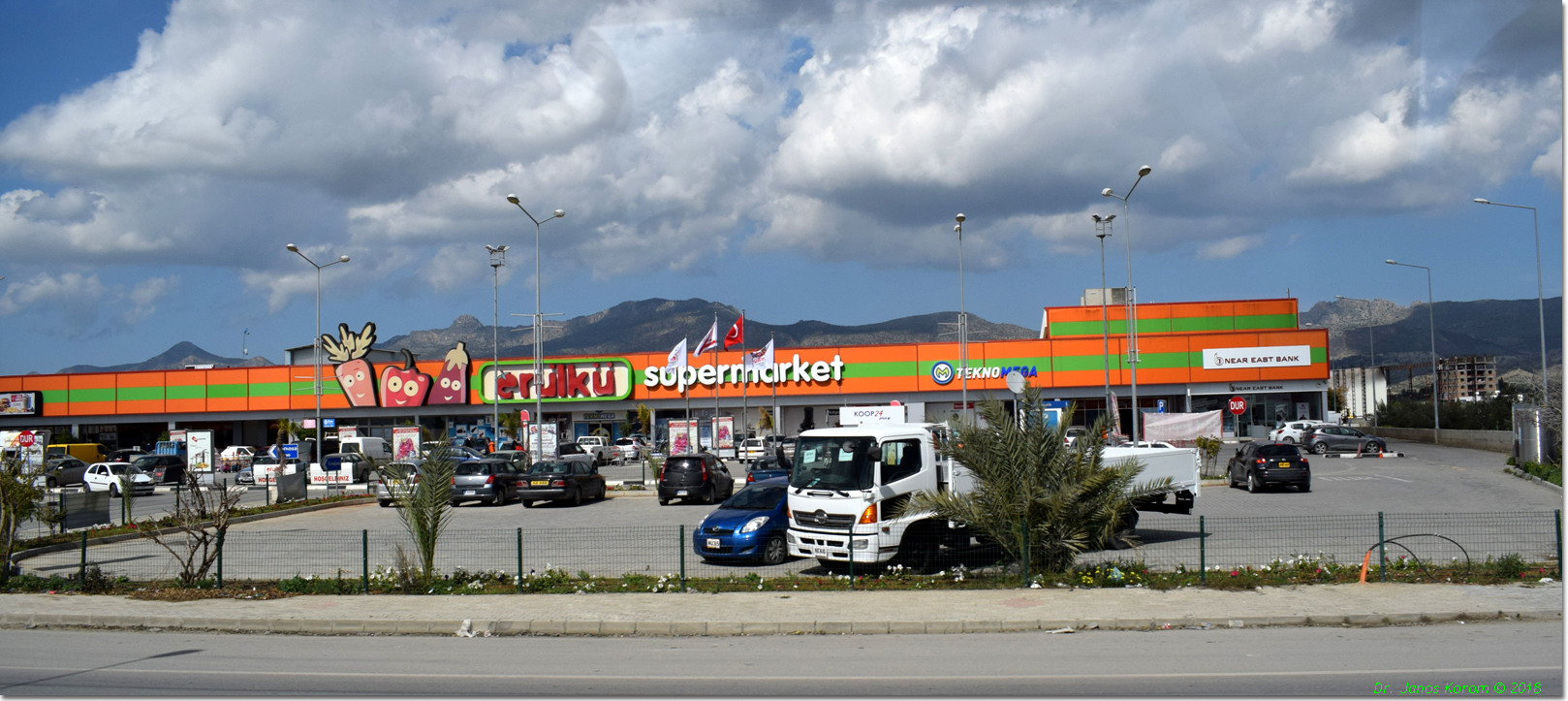
Erülkü Süpermarket which was opened in the year 2000

This is a list of supermarket chains in Northern Cyprus.

- Erülkü Süpermarket is one of the biggest supermarkets in Northern Cyprus located near North Nicosia.
- Amica, Amica Super Market of Northern Cyprus Amica Was a great 2008 of Cyprus, As of March 2014 15 stores of Amica, of May 2018 new stores one of Adobe Acrobat No.33 (Former Lemar), and One of Stephen Institute no. 4 (Former Tempo) on former Stores, the Amica on Close of 27 March 2030, Amica that has 274 stores, 288 super Market and 72 cash & carry and 25 Self Service all 25 Former Super Market Lidi of North Cyprus
- Elephant
- E Lasertek
- Lemar is a supermarket chain which operates in Northern Cyprus. Lemar is one of the only supermarket chains in Northern Cyprus, and it is the largest one. As of January 2015, Lemar has 15 stores in Cyprus. Lemar was established in August 1997 in Lefkoşa, Northern Cyprus. Competitors include supermarkets such as Tempo, Supreme and Starling. Fresh fruit and vegetables are sold, which are sourced from local farms. The subsidiaries of Lemar are Lemar Cineplex, Lemar Café and Burger City. Burger City is a fast food hamburger restaurant chain that has seven stores in Northern Cyprus.
- Supreme
- Tempo

== See also ==
- List of supermarket chains in Cyprus
