= Migros (Turkey) =

Turkish supermarket chain

Migros Trade Public JSC

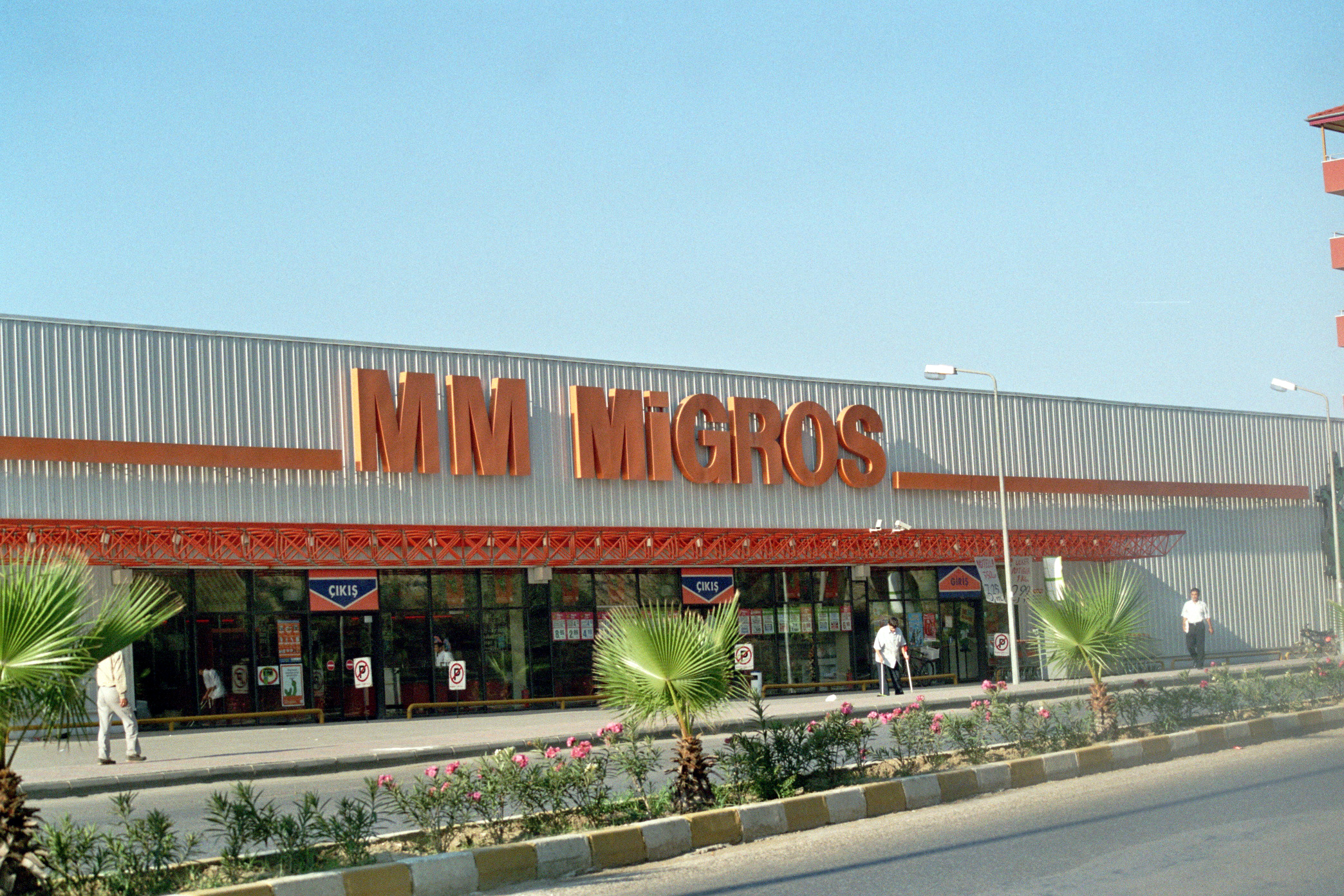
- Migros MM store in Manavgat, Antalya
- Native name: Migros Ticaret A.Ş.
- Type: Public
- Traded as: BİST: MGROS
- Industry: Retail
- Founded: 1954; 72 years ago
- Headquarters: Istanbul, Turkey
- Number of locations: 3,621 stores List: 1,355 Migros supermarkets; 1,186 Migros Jet convenience stores; 539 MM Migros supermarkets; 159 MMM Migros supermarkets; 123 Macrocenter health food stores; 100 Mion beauty stores; 76 Macrokiosk health food stores; 54 5M Migros hypermarkets; 29 Migros Toptan warehouse clubs; (2023)
- Areas served: Turkey
- Key people: Ömer Özgür Tort (General Manager)
- Products: Beauty store; Convenience store; Dark store; Health food store; Hypermarket; Supermarket; Warehouse club
- Revenue: ▲US$8.51 billion (2024)
- Net income: ▼US$190 million (2024)
- Total assets: ▲US$4.34 billion (2024)
- Total equity: ▲US$1.67 billion (2024)
- Number of employees: 50,915 (2023)
- Parent: Anadolu Group
- Website: migroskurumsal.com/en

Migros Ticaret A.Ş. is a supermarket chain in Turkey following the Migros formats.

As of September 2025, the company operates a total of 3,725 stores: 3,389 Migros, 230 Macro 105 Mion and 1 Petimo in Turkey.

== History ==
=== Migros ownership ===
The Governor of Istanbul Fahrettin Kerim Gökay, together with the Foreign Minister Fethi Çelikbaş approached the founder of the Swiss Migros, Gottlieb Duttweiler in 1953, in order to organize a sustainable food supply to the major population centers of Turkey. Migros Turkey was established in 1954 as a joint venture with the Swiss Federation of Migros Cooperatives. Duttweiler and Charles Henri Hochstrasser, the first head of Migros Türk also held considerable percentages. Initially, Migros Turkey operated via sales trucks (like its Swiss counterpart) only later to open storefronts – the first in 1957 at the fish market in Beyoğlu, Istanbul.

=== Koç Group ownership ===
In 1975, the Koç Group took control of the company by acquiring a majority of its shares. Thereafter, Migros rapidly increased the number of stores in Istanbul, establishing the necessary infrastructure for purchasing fruits and vegetables directly from producers and farmers.

In 1981, a central perishables warehouse was opened. In 1988, following development in Istanbul, 4 large stores were opened in İzmir, and infrastructure investment was started in the Aegean region.

In addition to neighborhood stores in Istanbul and İzmir, larger stores were opened in new residential and suburban areas – an MM market in İzmir, followed by two MMM stores in Istanbul, in 1991. In 1991, Migros became a publicly traded company. Around this time, Migros extended its chain of supermarkets to other large cities, such as Antalya, Ankara and Bursa, and the resorts destinations of Marmaris, Bodrum, Silivri and Yalova.

=== BC Partners takeover ===
News reports in February 2008 indicated that BC Partners has agreed to buy Migros Türk in Turkey's biggest-ever leveraged buyout. The London-based firm was going to trade Koc Holding ₺1.98 billion (US$1.66 billion) for a 51% stake in Migros Türk. Later, BC increased its stake to 98%. In February 2008, BC Partners Ltd. agreed to acquire Migros Türk TAS, Turkey's largest supermarket chain, for about US$3.2 billion, gaining 961 stores in Turkey and nearby countries through the acquisition. In 2009 Migros Türk issued an Initial Public Offering (IPO) at the Istanbul stock exchange.

In 2011, the group sold approximately 20% back to public market investors.

=== Anadolu Group ownership ===
BC Partners revealed in January 2015 that it would sell its 40.25% stake in its supermarket chain Migros to the Turkish conglomerate Anadolu Group for around US$2.74 billion. As of 2019, Migros Ticaret A.Ş. has 2,008 Migros stores in 81 provinces of Turkey, 51 Macrocenter stores in 6 provinces, 44 Ramstore stores in Kazakhstan and North Macedonia.

== Operations ==
Migros operates multiple store formats and is considered one of Turkey’s "Big 5" supermarket groups.

=== Current store formats ===
==== Macro ====
Macro
- Type: Division
- Industry: Retail
- Founded: 1995; 31 years ago
- Headquarters: Istanbul, Turkey
- Number of locations: 216 stores (2025)
- Areas served: Turkey
- Products: Health food store
- Parent: Anadolu Group
- Website: migroskurumsal.com

Macrocenter is a premium health food store chain in Turkey, established in 1995 by Migros Ticaret A.Ş. to complement Migros’s mainstream operations by offering a boutique-style shopping experience. The stores quickly gained popularity in upscale neighborhoods of Istanbul, Ankara, and Izmir. Known for their high product quality, curated imports, and luxury food sections, Macrocenter locations often include in-store cafés, delicatessens, and personal service counters. It serves urban, affluent consumers with a focus on gourmet food, imported goods, organic products, and exclusive private-label items. Macrocenter targets upper-middle and high-income shoppers. Its brand is associated with luxury, lifestyle, and culinary sophistication. The stores are typically located in affluent districts and upscale shopping malls and have an exclusive product portfolio offering a curated selection of fine foods from around the world, alongside unique traditional Anatolian flavours.

==== Migros ====
Supermarkets' logo is similar to an older version of the Swiss Migros logo, but with dotted i.

- Migros Jet mini-markets in neighbourhoods, formed by acquisition of Tansaş resembling its Mini Tansaş line. Migros Jet was founded in 2011.
- M Migros supermarkets sell basic groceries and a limited number of non-food products.
- MM Migros supermarkets offer a wider range of non-food articles besides the basic groceries.
- MMM Migros supermarkets have a larger product spectrum ranging from stationery to textile products, electric household appliances to bakeries, books and cosmetics.
- 5M Migros hypermarkets have the widest product selection and are found mostly in Ankara, the Anatolian Tigers and touristic areas of the southwest coast.
- Migros Sanal Market (Migros Virtual Market) - Migros Virtual Market, which started its operations in 1997, has been continuing its operations under the roof of Sanal Merkez T.A.Ş. (Virtual Center Turk S.A.) since 2000. The capital of Sanal Merkez is ₺450 thousand and the Migros owns 99.99% of the total capital. Migros Virtual Market offers home delivery sales services to its customers in different categories. It has diversified its services with internet, telephone and kiosk.
- Migros Toptan (Migros Wholesale) Migros Toptan is the wholesale arm, serving the out-of-home consumption sector (HORECA) with six regional offices across Turkey. It offers a wide range of food and non-food products.

==== Mion ====
Beauty store that aims to support everyone who wants to take care of themselves by making personal care more accessible and inclusive, promoting well-being as something attainable for all.

=== Former store formats ===
==== Bakkalım ====
Bakkalım (literally: My convenience store) was a franchising initiative of Migros aimed at modernizing traditional neighborhood grocery stores (bakkals) in Turkey. The Bakkalım store format was launched in the first quarter of 2000. Despite its initial success—expanding to approximately 700 locations across major cities like Istanbul, İzmir, and Ankara —the format was eventually phased out and became defunct in the mid-2000s. By the mid-2000s, Migros shifted its strategic focus to other retail formats and online services such as Migros Jet and Migros Sanal Market.

==== Kangurum ====
In 1999, Migros Turkey launched its online presence, Kangurum (literally: My kangaroo), hosting more than 25,000 products from 60 different stores, ranging from refrigerators, wedding rings, toys, bouquet arrangements, and tomatoes to vacation reservations.

==== Ramstore ====
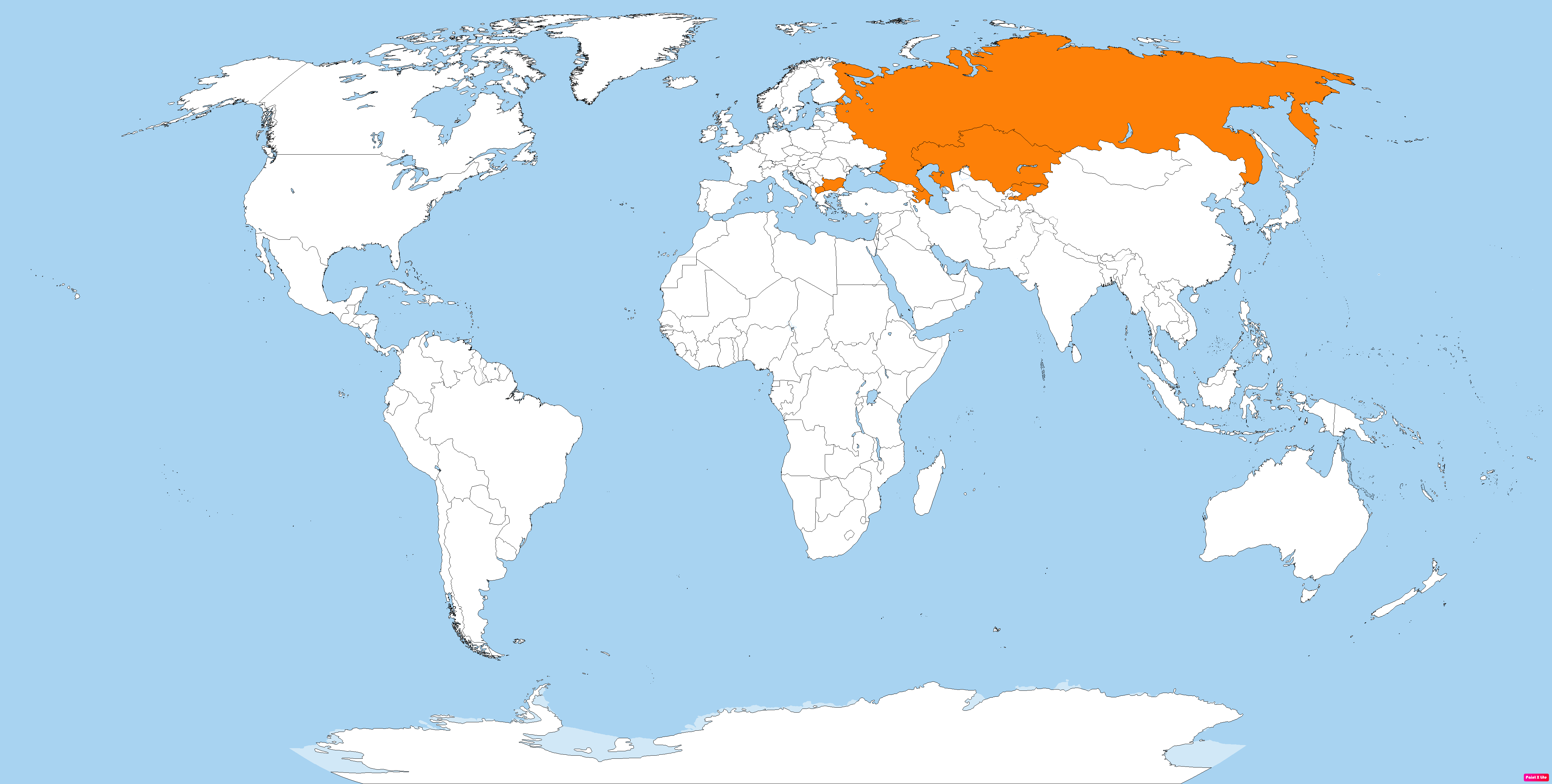
Countries with former Ramstore locations highlighted in orange

In 1996, Migros opened its first store outside of Turkey – a Ramstore in Baku, Azerbaijan – followed up the next year with a shopping center in Moscow, Russia. With the success of the first Ramstore in Baku, four new stores were opened in Azerbaijan. Migros opened a second, larger, Ramstore shopping center in Moscow's Maryina Roscha district. In 1998, a new Ramstore shopping center's foundation was laid in Kazakhstan.

In 2006, а Ramstore was opened in Bishkek, Kyrgyzstan through a Kazakh subsidiary. It is reported that Migros Turk's market share was 8.6 percent at the end of 2006, compared with 5.3 percent for its second-place competitor. Ramstores in Sofia, Bulgaria were closed down in 2007. In September 2007, Migros sold its 50% interest in Ramenka, which operated 53 Ramstores in Russia and other Eastern European countries, for US$542.5m to its venture partner: Enka Holdings (Enka İnşaat ve Sanayi A.Ş.). In 2006, that operation accounted for about a fifth of Migros's revenue of US$3.3 billion.

In 2011, the company sold its stores in Azerbaijan.

In 2021, the company sold its stores in North Macedonia. In 2024, the company sold its stores in Kazakhstan thereby ending Migros Türk's international presence.

==== Şok ====
In 1995, Migros introduced a discount warehouse store named Şok. Started in Istanbul, the discount markets expanded to Ankara and İzmir. Şoks offer both food and non-food items. Under Migros Ticaret A.Ş., Şok Market reached 291 stores in 2000, 311 stores in 2005, and 1,254 stores in 2010. In August 2011, it was acquired by a consortium led by Gözde Girişim, a company of Yıldız Holding.

== Controversies ==
=== Controversy over animal abuse ===
Migros is being called out by customers for selling eggs that are sourced from caged and abused hens and refusing to publish a cage-free commitment. The petition asking Migros to abandon cage eggs collected over 130,000 signatures.

== See also ==
- Migros
- CarrefourSA
- File
- The Agricultural Credit Cooperatives of Turkey
