= Bim (company) =

Turkish multinational discount supermarket company

BİM United Stores A.Ş.
- Native name: BİM Birleşik Mağazalar A.Ş.
- Type: Public
- Traded as: BİST: BIMAS
- Industry: Retail
- Founded: 1995; 31 years ago
- Headquarters: Turkey
- Number of locations: 14,473 stores List: 12,571 Bim stores (Turkey); 344 File stores (Turkey); 933 stores (Morocco); 445 stores (Egypt); (2025)
- Area served: Egypt, Morocco, Turkey
- Key people: Mustafa Latif Topbaş (Chairman)
- Products: Supermarket; Warehouse store
- Revenue: ▲US$14.84 billion (2024)
- Operating income: ▼US$151.4 million (2024)
- Net income: ▼US$531.8 million (2024)
- Total assets: ▲US$6.73 billion (2024)
- Total equity: ▲US$3.38 billion (2024)
- Number of employees: 86,647 (2023)
- Subsidiaries: File
- Website: bim.com.tr

BİM Birleşik Mağazalar A.Ş. (BİM for short) is a Turkish retail company, known for offering a limited range of basic food items and consumer goods at competitive prices. Bim were the pioneers of this discount store model in Turkey.

== History ==
Bim A.Ş. was founded in 1995 by a group of investors around Cuneyd Zapsu. Zapsu sold his shares to the investment bank Merrill Lynch in 2000. Today, the main shareholder is Mustafa Latif Topbaş. In 2005 44.12% of its shares were offered to the public.

== Operations ==
At the beginning, BİM had only 21 stores, but it expanded thoroughly and by the end of 2015 it counted 4,972 and 2019; 7,438 stores by the third quarter of 2021, the company operated 10,330 stores. It also operates 828 stores in Morocco and 300 in Egypt. BİM does not offer franchises, all stores are owned and operated by the company itself, and they are viewed as a competition to the many independent neighborhood stores. The business model is inspired by the German discounter ALDI.

== Private label brands ==
Bim has 152 private label brands.

=== Bakery ===
- Connex — dough and sponge cake
- Ekmecik — bread
- Unlum — phyllo dough
- Unlüx — bread

=== Cleaning & Household ===
- Activ-blok — toilet deodorizer
- AKS — surface cleaner
  - AKS Bril — kitchen and bathroom cleaner
- Art Matik — laundry detergent
- Bill Matik — powder laundry detergent
- Bind Activit — dishwashing tablets
- Bulut — fabric softener
- Desto — dishwashing detergent
- Güldal — bleach and cleaner
- Mr. Bee — cream cleaner
- Mr. Green — cleaning cloths
- Protex — aluminium foil, baking paper, garbage, and storage bags
- RoomStar — air freshener
- Santa — picnicware

=== Dairy, Eggs & Fridge ===
- Aknaz — white cheese
- Bili Bili — eggs
- Binvezir — cheese
- Daphne — pudding
- Dost — yogurt, milk, ayran, and cottage cheese
  - Dost Gurme — fruit yogurt
- Kaanbey — kashar cheese
- Kerem — cream and cream cheese
- Osmanoğlu — desserts
- Pervin — butter
- Sole — margarine
- Üç Köşem — cheese triangles

=== Drinks ===
- Abdullah Efendi — Turkish coffee
- Agah — boza
- Assu — water
- Berk — tea
- Etkin — lemonade
- Fer — lemon soda
- Jucy — fruit juice
- Karlıtepe — mineral water
- Le'Cola — cola
- Le'Porta — orange soda
- Le'Mandy — mandarin soda
- LeMonte — single-serve lemonade
- Performans — energy drink
- Teatone — iced tea
- VIP — instant coffee
- Will — pineapple juice

=== Freezer ===
- Adora — ice cream
- Bugido — ice cream
  - Bugido MaSante — ice cream
- Dudi — ice cream
- Fair — ice cream
  - Fair Gold — premium ice cream
- Ice Loly — ice pops
- Lezzethane — frozen products
- Mutfağım — frozen products

=== Health & Beauty ===
- A Plus — hair care
  - A Plus Elegance — hair dye
- Agu Baby — baby shampoo
- Apaks — cotton pads and cotton swabs
- Blume — tissue paper
- Capitol — hair care
- Dushy — shower gel
- Epi — hair removal
- Family — baby wipes
- Işıl — soap
- Ivory — pocket wet wipes
- Jenny & Willy — baby diaper
- Karayel — Kolonya
- Lâl — feminine hygiene
- Let's — condoms
- Man S — male grooming
- Mercy — perfume
- Performans — sports nutrition
- Powerdent — oral hygiene
  - Powerdent Shine — toothpaste
- Queen — paper towel
  - Queen 3— toilet paper
- Scarlett — feminine hygiene
- Shela — deodorant
- Shine — toothbrush
- Silver Rose — cosmetics

=== Meat, Seafood & Deli ===
- BGrill — poultry burgers and döner kebab
- Derya — seafood
- Emin — beef and lamb
- M.Z. Ege — çiğ köfte
- Tazem — poultry
- Tombik — deli meats

=== Pantry ===
- Balkaşık — honey
- Bol Bol — sauces
- Cardella — pasta
- Cupido — cornflakes
- Çiğdem — corn oil
- Daphne — pudding mix
- Derya — tinned seafood
- Destan — spices
- Efor — vinegar
- Efsane — rice, flour
- Felice — pistachio paste
- Fıçı — pickles
- Hürrem — soup mix and stock
- İlkgün — jam
- İnci — olives
- Kelly's — corn flakes
  - Kelly's Fitness Club — muesli and granola
- Mutfağım — canola oil
- Pasta Veneta — premium pasta
- Peripella — hazelnut spread
- Saban — bulgur and legumes
- Sayley — hazelnut spread
- Serel — tahini, molasses, halva
- Sırım — olive oil
- Sole — sunflower oil
- Şafak — granulated sugar and sugar cubes
- Yazgan — semolina
- Yurdum — tomato paste, tomato sauce, mixed vegetables, corn, and ready meals

=== Snacks & Confectionery ===
- Bruno — cream sandwich biscuits
- Buono — chocolate
  - BuonoDolce — hazelnut chocolate
- Carlotti — ladyfinger biscuits
- Casey — cake
- Centro — wafer
- GofGof — chocolate covered wafer
- Hazine — chocolate
- Hyper Bon — chewing gum
- Jelly Party — gummy candy
- Krınkıl — pretzel sticks
- Party — corn chips
- Patito — potato chips
- Simbat — nuts
- Sniti — cacao cream sandwich biscuits
- Star Krak — corn snacks and popcorn
- Startop — sugar-coated candies
- Süsse — biscuits
- Tindy Candy — hard candy
- Top Stars — chocolate coated fruit and nuts
- Topi Gum — bubble gum lollipop
- Topi Tanem — chocolate confections
- Vow — caramel chocolate
- Wall Star — coconut filled chocolate
- Yaşam — tea biscuits

=== Miscellaneous ===
- Abdullah Efendi Keyif — Turkish coffee machines
- Casilda Home — home decor
- Chef's — cookware and kitchenware
  - Chef's Plus — premium cookware and kitchenware
  - Chef's Pro — professional-grade cookware and kitchenware
- Comfort Family — underwear
- Dijitsu — consumer electronics
- Keysmart — home appliances
- Mr. Bady — toys
- Power B — batteries
- Power Key — light bulbs
- Studi — stationery

== See also ==
- Şok
- A101
