= List of mayors of İzmir =

The following list is the list of mayors of İzmir, Turkey, after the proclamation of the Turkish republic.

Period	Years	Mayor	Status of İzmir
Governors as mayors	1923-24	Şükrü Kaya	Province center
Governors as mayors	1924-24	Muammer Uşaklıgil	Province center
Governors as mayors	1924-27	Hüseyin Aziz Akyürek	Province center
Governors as mayors	1928-30	Ahmet Hulusi Alataş	Province center
Governors as mayors	1930-31	Sezai Göker	Province center
Governors as mayors	1931-41	Behçet Uz	Province center
Governors as mayors	1941-49	Reşat Leblebicioğlu	Province center
Governors as mayors	1949-50	Hulusi N. Selek	Province center
Governors as mayors	1950-54	Rauf Onursal	Province center
Governors as mayors	1954-55	Selahattin Akçiçek	Province center
Governors as mayors	1955-57	Enver Dündar	Province center
Governors as mayors	1957-60	Faruk Tunca	Province center
Military rule	1960-60	Sefa Poyraz	Province center
Military rule	1960-61	Burhanettin Uluç	Province center
Military rule	1962-63	Enver Saatçigil	Province center
Military rule	1963-63	Rebii Başol	Province center
Elected mayors	1963-73	Osman Kibar	Province center
Elected mayors	1973-80	İhsan Alyanak	Province center
Military rule	1980-83	Cahit Günay	Province center
Military rule	1983-84	Ceyhan Demir	Province center
Elected mayors	1984-89	Burhan Özfatura	Metropolitan center
Elected mayors	1989-94	Yüksel Çakmur	Metropolitan center
Elected mayors	1994-99	Burhan Özfatura	Metropolitan center
Elected mayors	1999-2004	Ahmet Piriştina	Metropolitan center
Elected mayors	2004-19	Aziz Kocaoğlu	Metropolitan center
Elected mayors	2019-24	Tunç Soyer	Metropolitan center
Elected mayors	2024-	Cemil Tugay	Metropolitan center
