= A101 (company) =

Turkish discount supermarket chain

A101 New Retail S.A.
- Native name: A101 Yeni Mağazacılık A.Ş
- Type: Subsidiary
- Industry: Retail
- Founded: March 28, 2008; 18 years ago
- Headquarters: Turkey
- Number of locations: 13,500 (2026)
- Number of employees: 36
- Parent: Turgut Aydın Holding

A101 Yeni Mağazacılık A.Ş. or often shortened as A101 is a Turkish retail company founded in 2008, with their headquarters being located at Üsküdar, İstanbul. 79.21% of A101 is owned by Turgut Aydın Holding.

It is one of the 3 discount grocery store chains that have locations in all 81 provinces of Turkey, alongside Bim and Şok.

== History ==
A101 was founded on 28 March 2008 by Turgut Aydın in Istanbul. A101's main business model is being a discounter, just like their main competitor, Bim.

On 16 July 2016, six suspects accused of providing financial support to Fetulllah Terrorist Organization including A101's owner Turgut Aydın and some of A101's board members. The six were detained along with 92 others over claims of providing financial support to FETO, the carrier of the deadly coup attempt on 15 July, according to a police source. On 19 August 2016, the suspects were released on orders of the Istanbul Chief Public Prosecutor's Office after they recorded their testimonies.

== Operations ==
Shipments are made from warehouses to stores, with trucks belonging to A101.

In April 2020, A101 launched their grocery delivery app called "A101 Kapıda". On 30 December 2020, A101 opened their 10,001st store, thus taking the record of most store locations from their rival Bim.

== Private label brands ==
A101 has 63 private label brands.

- Ahir — cheese
- Balye — honey
- Baştacı — delicatessen
- Bendo — pasta and noodles
- Bi — soft drinks and iced tea
  - Bi Sıfır — sugar-free soft drinks
- Birşah — yogurt, milk, and ayran
- Bolmix — jam
- Bozbeyi — cheese
- Brid — dishwashing detergent and tablets
- Burch — popcorn, cornflakes, and oatmeal
- Cafex — coffee
- Çerezya — nuts and chips
- Çiçeğim — bleach and cleaner
- Clean & Fun — cleaning cloth
- Çokça — sauces, legumes, and cig kofte
- Dear Body — sunscreen
- Denta — toothpaste
- Diyar — spices
- Dooy — fruit juice
- Dorbi — cocoa, baking powder, and pudding
- Findux — hazelnut spread
- Galle — pickles
- Hair Shine — shampoo
- Hanımdan — milk-based desserts
- Hi-Level — television
- Hun — tahini, molasses, and halva
- Hürmet — biscuits
- Inflame — lightbulb
- Karadem — tea
- Kekspır — cake
- Keyfe — Turkish coffee
- Kombinet — delicatessen
- La Belle — pads
- Let's Quick — milk chocolate
- Luci — gloves and trash bags
- Mendiva — tissues
- Milkten — cheese, butter, and pudding
  - Milkten Milkino — fruit and chocolate milk
- Mistral — toilet paper
- Nimet — bakery products
- Ottimo — glassware
- Ovadan — rice
- Petek — sugar
- Peynes — cottage cheese
- Pıtpıt — candy
- Ritm — air freshener
- Samire — salt
- Serinoba — soda and mineral water
- Soffio — diapers
- Spon — foil and bags
- Şokoley — hazelnut spread
- Tarabya — kaşar cheese
- Vegilet — gum
- Vera — cooking oil
- Vince — chocolate
- Vini — wafer
- Wawa — tinned tuna
- Wind — laundry detergent
- Xroll — wafer and chocolate
- Yeğenler — flour
- Yöremce — legumes
- Zeo — olives
- foox --- foox
