= Tuncay Özilhan =

Turkish businessman and billionaire (born 1947)

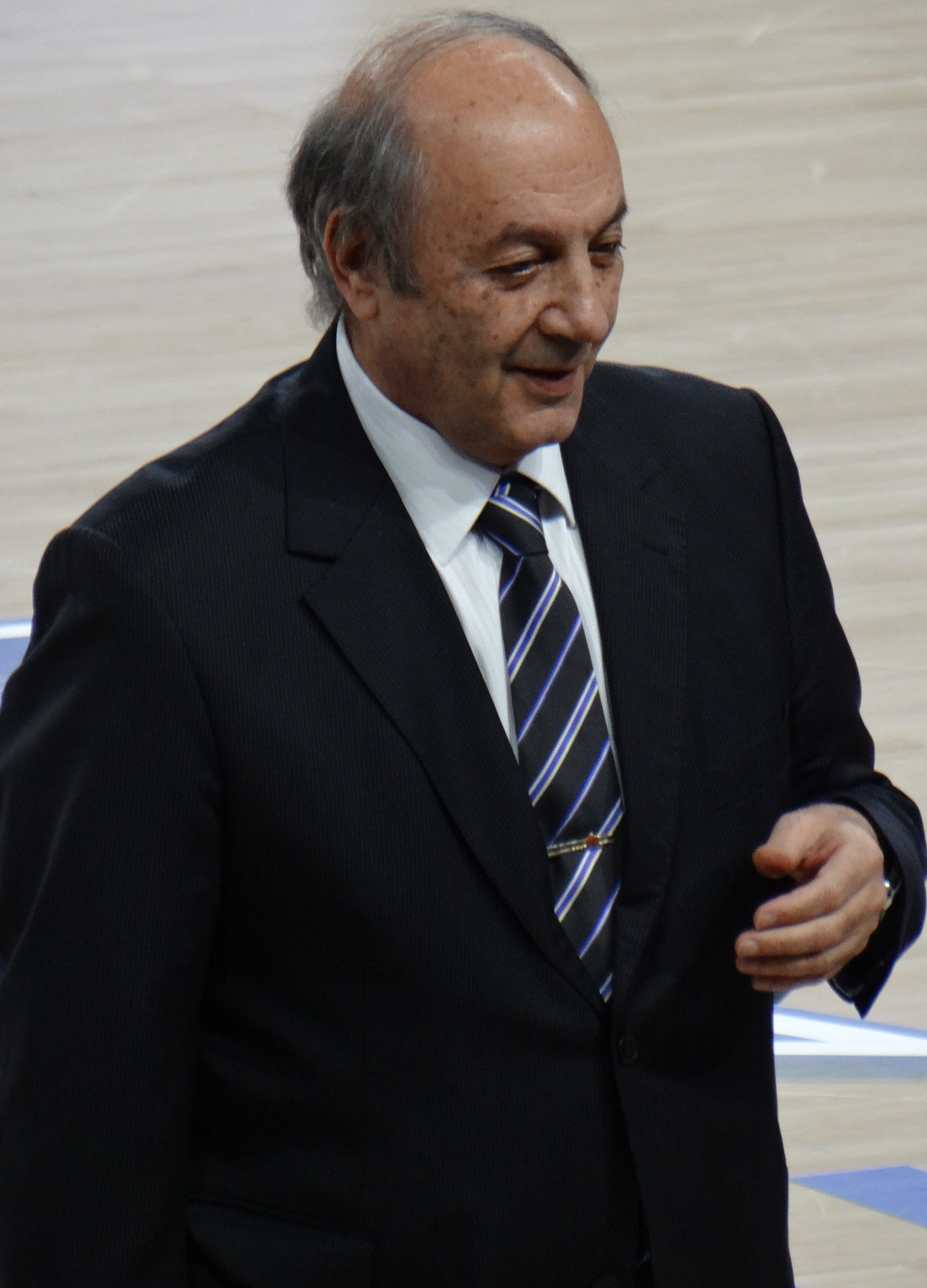
- Born: 9 July 1947 (age 78); Develi, Kayseri, Turkey
- Education: Lycée Saint-Joseph, Istanbul
- Alma mater: Istanbul University (BS); Long Island University (MBA)
- Spouse: Emine Özilhan
- Children: 3

Tuncay Özilhan (born 9 July 1947) is a Turkish businessman and billionaire. He is the current chairman of the board of Anadolu Group, as well as the president of Anadolu Efes. He was also the president of TÜSİAD from 2001 to 2004. He is also chairman of the board of supermarket chain Kipa.
