= The Cornish Bakery =

British bakery chain

Branch in York, UK

The Cornish Bakery is a British bakery chain. It was founded in 1994 in Mevagissey, Cornwall, UK by Steve Grocutt and had 66 shops in 2025. It was named Pasty Presto before rebranding to its current name in 2015. In 2025 Grocutt said he was considering selling the company.

Food counter, Lewes
