= Male grooming =

Men's hair care, skin care, shaving and clothes care, primarily relating to appearance

Male grooming refers to men paying attention to fashion and enhancing their own appearance. This interest has become increasingly apparent in popular culture.

== By location ==
According to Statista, by 2024 the global male grooming market is estimated to be worth about US $81.2 billion.

=== South Korea ===
South Korea has become a center of cosmetics use by men due to "appearance competition", where men wear makeup to compete in tight job markets. The Korean wave cultural phenomenon, which includes K-pop, has also strongly influenced male grooming. As pop idols in their 20s and so-called "flower boys" have grown in popularity, the perception of men's makeup has changed. While it was once common for men who wore makeup to be associated with drag queens or homosexuality in western cultures, Korean male idols, although they are boyish in appearance, otherwise project masculinity. Men are encouraged to copy the makeup of Korean male idols. In fashion and beauty magazines overseas, there are many articles on skin care and makeup tutorials inspired by Korean pop stars.

=== China ===
The "woman-like man" has become a new trend in China, where a growing number of young men are interested in makeup. The number of internet broadcasters and beauty bloggers who produce makeup videos for men has increased rapidly. Accordingly, the men's cosmetics industry has grown rapidly in China. According to German market-research firm Statista, the size of the men's cosmetics industry in China reached 201.3 billion yuan as of May 2018. Chinese e-commerce company JD.com said that the sales of beauty products for men has more than doubled since 2015. Mask packs, BB cream, and lipstick are popular products.

=== United States ===
Men's grooming has grown substantially in the US and is projected to continue growing through the 2020s.

== Hair care ==
=== Hair styling ===
Barber shops are also one of the places that can assist modern grooming men. Barbers are licensed professionals who are trained to cut, shave, and style head hair and beards. Male grooming products—including pomades, shave products, powder, beard oil, and shampoo and conditioners—can be purchased at barbershop.

Interest in eyebrow trimming and eyebrow makeup has also increased, and sales of eyebrow beauty tools have increased in the last few years.

=== Body grooming ===
The grooming of male bodily hair has a long history in human culture for both cultural, aesthetic, sexual and practical purposes (see: History of male body grooming).

From the ancient Egyptians and Greeks up until modern times, the trimming or removing of body hair has been particularly popular among athletes, for whom it can provide a slight competitive edge in activities such as wrestling, running, swimming, and more recently, cycling (see: Reasons for grooming).

In recent decades, male bodily hair removal and trimming, as distinct from head hair grooming activities, has seen a revival for aesthetic and sexual purposes. This rising prevalence has led to the coining of the term 'manscaping' as a specific neologism to describe the practice. The term is a portmanteau of the words 'man' and 'landscaping', and its first known use was in 2003.

== Skin care ==
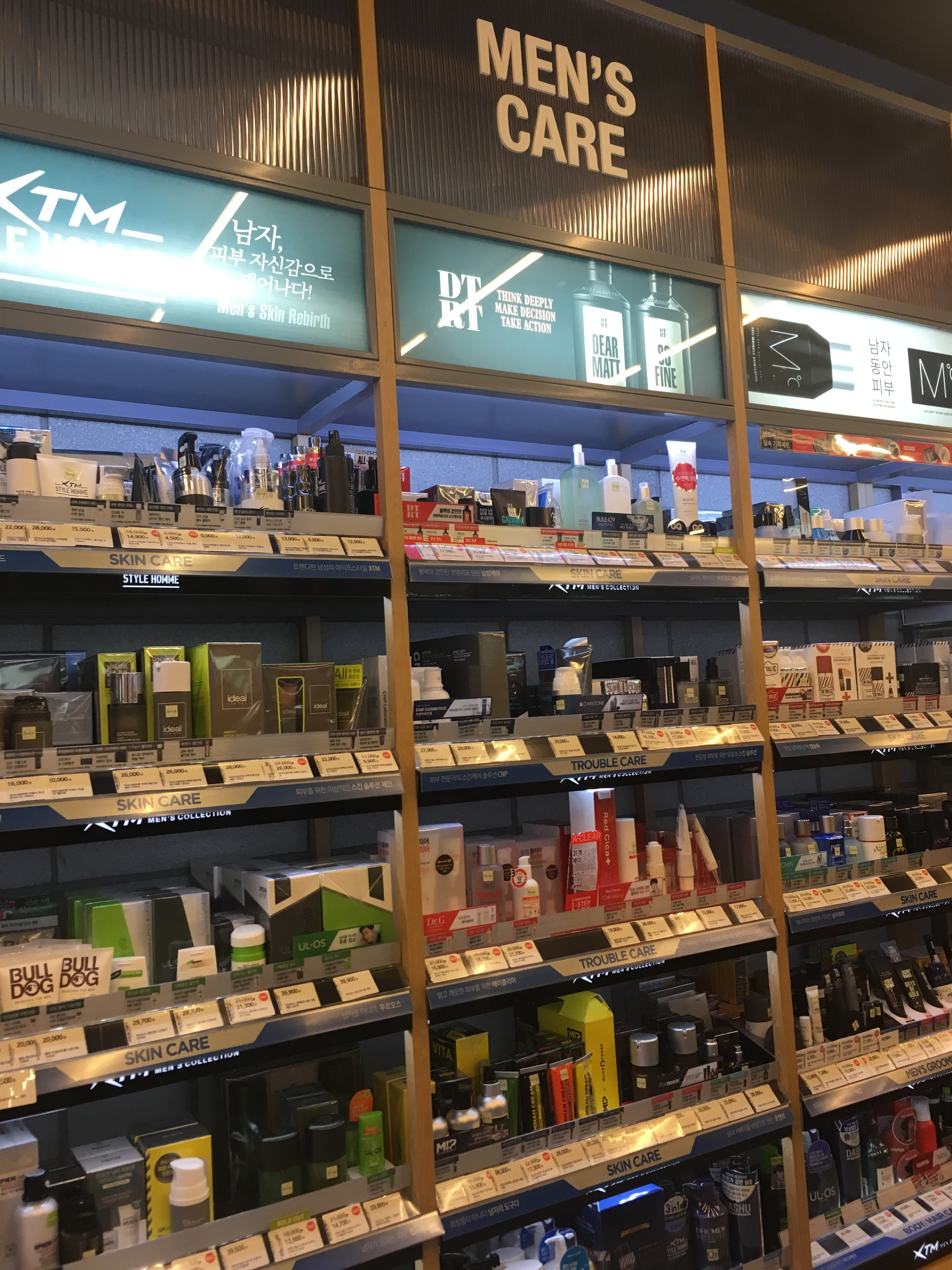
Male cosmetics in drug store

Men's cosmetics products—toners, fragrances, and lotions—have gained a foothold in the mainstream market. In addition, cosmetics that can be used by either men or women have become popular.

The Korean men's cosmetics market has steadily grown from 733 billion won, in 2010, to 1.23 trillion won, in 2016, and to 1.23 trillion won (c. US $1.1 bn), in 2018. About 75% of Korean men use cosmetics more than once a week, according to global data from overseas market research institutions, which indicates that the percentage of men who use cosmetics in Korea is higher than that of other countries.

According to a recent survey by Mintel, a global market research firm, 70% of 1,000 American men use sunscreen, and 67% of men use cosmetics for their facial skin.

BB cream is used to heighten skin tone. Men's BB cream is characterized by its delicate and natural persistence. This covers skin defects, but does not look like one is wearing makeup.

Eyebrow pencil is used to sculpt the eyes by accentuating the contour of the brows and define the brows for a natural look. Men with sparse or thin brows use eyebrow pencil for fuller-looking brows.

Lip balm is a beauty item that is easily available to men who don't wear makeup. Colored lip balm is popular because it is used not only for moisturizing but also to help with skin tone. Colored lip balm is suitable for men who prefer a natural look because it can brighten lips with color that compliments natural skin tone, but more subtly than lipstick or tint.

== Cosmetic surgery ==
Men are willing to go to the operating room to make a favorable impression.

=== Botox ===
Men with small wrinkles on their faces, such as around the eyes and mouth, are seeking Botox treatments, such as what women get. Middle-aged men get Botox surgery for skin regeneration and wrinkle removal in the hope of securing a new job.

=== Eyebrow tattoo ===
The eyebrows play a big role in facial expression to the extent that they are called "the roof of the face". Over 100,000 years, the role of eyebrows has become more important as the size of human faces has become smaller and the facial lines have become smoother. Dark eyebrows on a small face make other people more aware of facial expressions. Recently, there has been a trend of men tattooing their eyebrows. The process of a permanent eyebrow tattoo involves designing the eyebrows and filling with pigment.

=== Contouring injection surgery ===
Male contouring injection surgery removes fat from the face and creates clearly defined facial features.

=== Waxing and laser procedures ===
Men are having laser treatments for permanent removal of facial and body hair.

== Influence in society ==
=== Increasing importance of personal appearance ===
When asked "What do you think are the criteria for a nice man?", in a survey conducted by the Korea National Statistical Office, "look and fashion" accounted for 22.7%, followed by character, economy, and values. When asked "What do you think of a well-dressed man?", 37.2% thought "cool" and 30.1% said "I want to try". In addition, there is the phenomenon of men valuing appearance over ability. People are undergoing cosmetic surgery to make favorable impressions during interviews. As a result of the perception that a change in facial shape improves first impressions, facial contouring surgery is becoming popular across industries.

=== Corporate strategy ===
There has been a growth in corporate gifting to align with the demand for men's grooming products. Men with sharp features are finding opportunities in conventional advertising. Both men and women have changed their perception of men looking after their appearance in relation to being competitive in the job market and in marrying.
