= Hotel Chocolat =

British chocolatier

Hotel Chocolat Group Limited
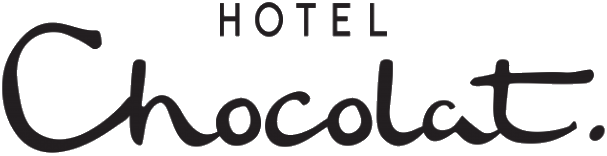

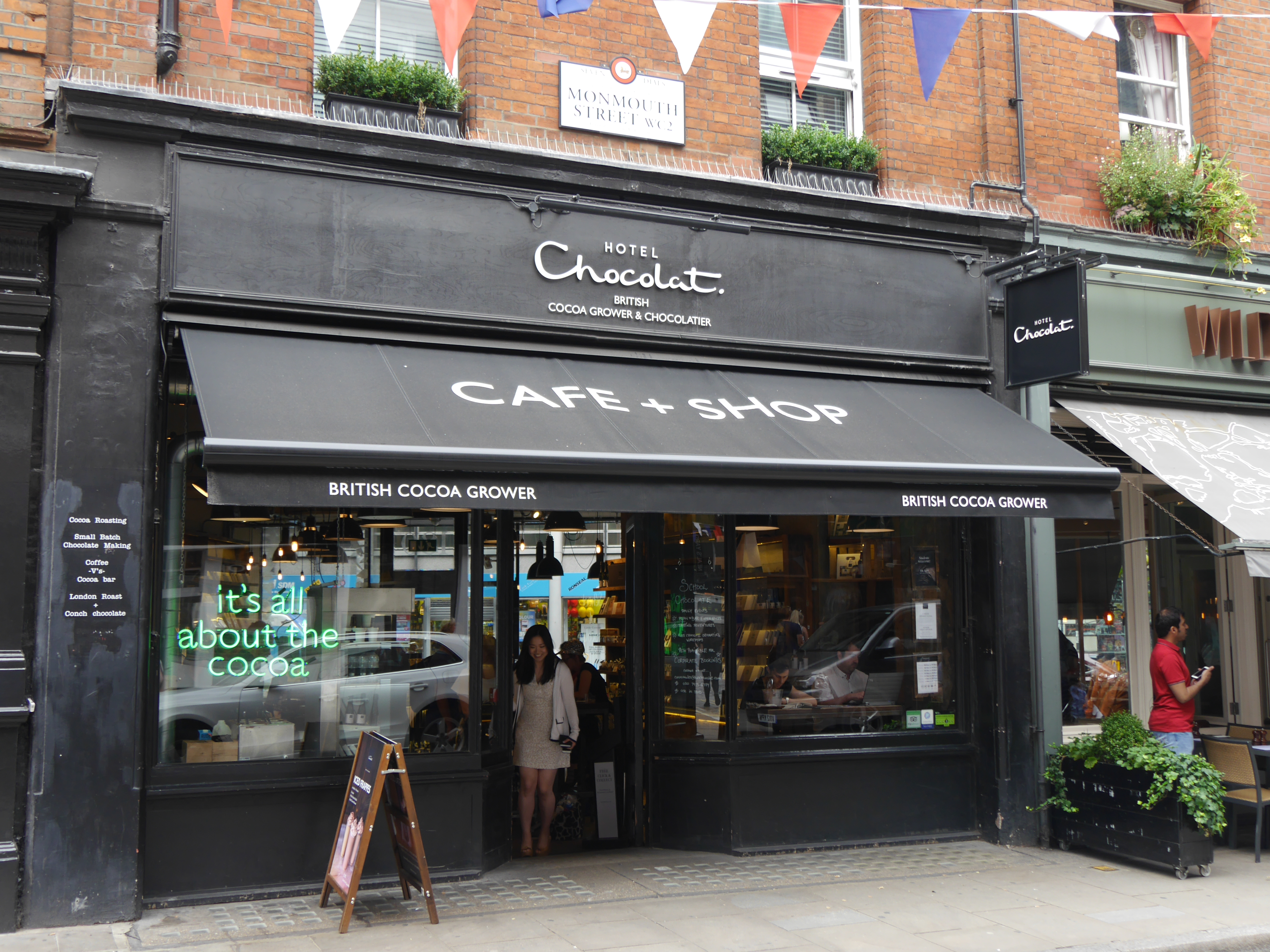
- Hotel Chocolat café in Covent Garden, London
- Formerly: Hotel Chocolat Group Limited (2013–2016); Hotel Chocolat Group PLC (2016–2024)
- Type: Subsidiary
- Traded as: LSE: HOTC
- Industry: Chocolatier
- Founded: 1993; 33 years ago
- Founder: Angus Thirlwell; Peter Harris
- Headquarters: Royston, Hertfordshire
- Number of locations: 164 (2025)
- Products: Chocolate; Hot Chocolate; Gifts; Cooking Chocolate; Cuisine Items; Drinking Tea
- Revenue: £204.5 million (2023)
- Number of employees: 2,300+
- Parent: Mars Snacking
- Website: hotelchocolat.com

Hotel Chocolat Group Limited is a British chocolate manufacturer and cocoa grower. It produces and distributes chocolate and other cocoa related products online and through a network of cafés, restaurants, outlets and factory stores.

By 2023, it had been reported that the firm had 125 stores spread across the United Kingdom. It is the only company in the UK to own its own cocoa farm. Its acquisition by Mars Inc. was completed in January 2024.

== History ==
In 1990, Angus Thirlwell and Peter Harris began designing and selling mints under the brand "Mint Marketing Company (MMC)", before moving to chocolates about six years later under the "Geneva Chocolates" brand. Thirlwell and Harris' success led them to expand their business into the catalogue order market under the "Chocolate Express" brand.

In 1998, the Chocolate Tasting Club was launched in Britain; as of 2014, it has around 100,000 members. To date, the Tasting Club has trialled over 1,500 different recipes. As detailed on their website, the Chocolate Tasting Club sends out boxes to customers all over the country each month.

In 2003, Chocolate Express (ChocExpress) rebranded as Hotel Chocolat and launched its first retail store in the centre of Watford. The company then grew initially to having four stores in East Anglia, with stores in Milton Keynes, Cambridge and St Albans opening between 2005 and 2006.

In 2006, the company officially acquired the Rabot Estate in Saint Lucia, and is, to date, the only company in the UK to own its own cocoa farm. This farm is one of the reasons given for the company choosing not to be Fair Trade-accredited, as only smallholdings are allowed.

In 2011, Hotel Chocolat opened its Boucan Hotel in Saint Lucia. The hotel sits on the Rabot Estate which is perched high up between the Piton mountains. The hotel currently has six lodges and a cocoa-inspired Boucan Restaurant.

In November 2013, it opened two UK restaurants, Rabot 1745 in London's Borough Market, and Roast + Conch in Leeds. In August 2017, one year after becoming listed on the London Stock Exchange as Hotel Chocolat Group PLC, it opened its first stores in the Republic of Ireland in Dundrum, Dublin.

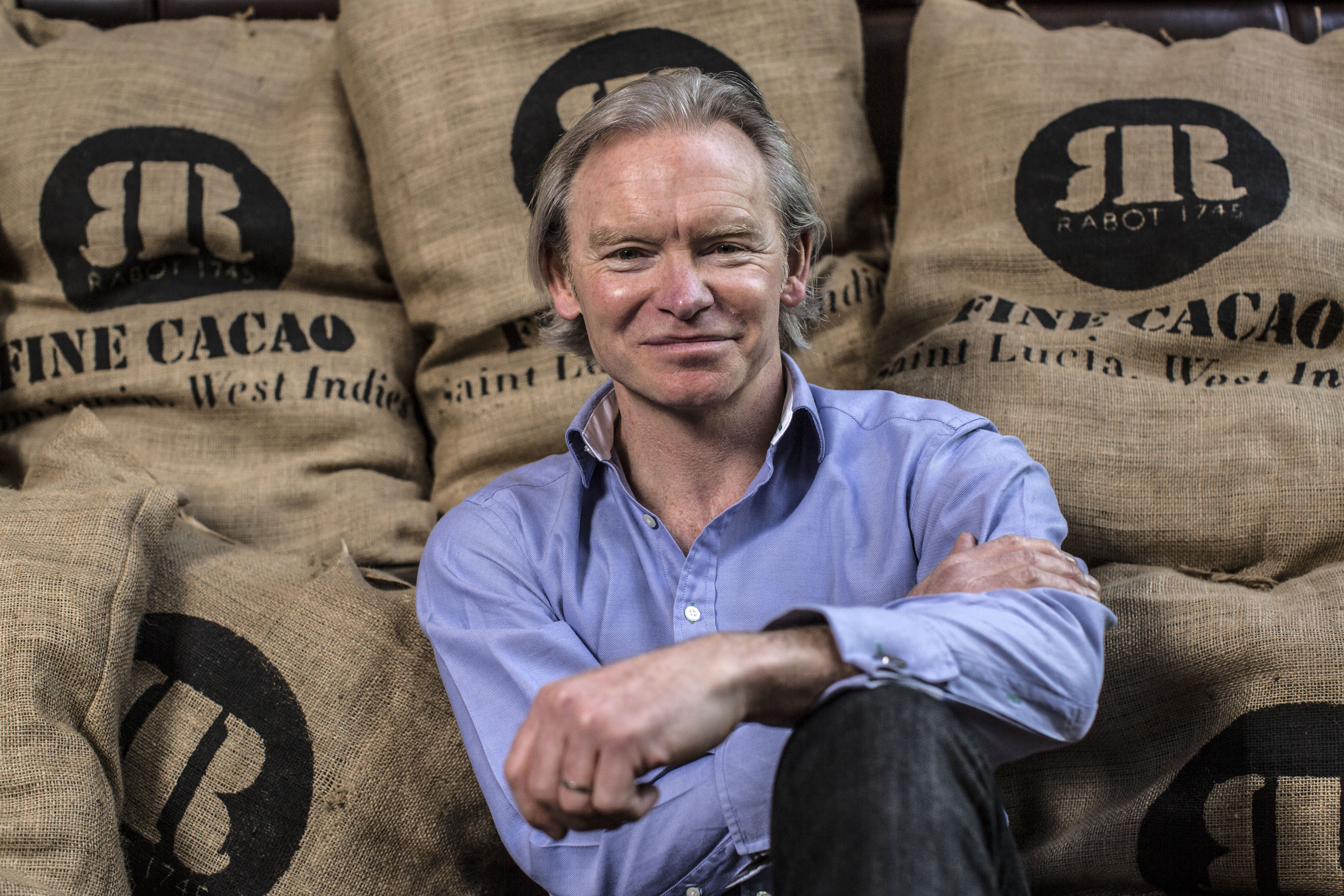
Angus Thirlwell, CEO of Hotel Chocolat

In January 2019, British television station Channel 5 aired a two-series documentary as part of their "Inside" series, titled "Inside Hotel Chocolat". Another British television station, Channel 4, aired two documentaries in 2022 also focused on Hotel Chocolat; the first was "Hotel Chocolat at Easter" in April 2022 and the second was titled "Hotel Chocolat: Inside the Chocolate Factory" in August 2022.

In November 2023, Hotel Chocolat agreed to be acquired by American confectionery company Mars, Inc in an all-cash deal for £534 million. Both companies have expressed hope that the deal will increase the brand's exposure internationally. The deal closed on 25 January 2024.

In March 2025, Channel 4 released a two-part docuseries titled "Hotel Chocolat: Unwrapped" which was aired in March and April. A festive episode was released in December 2025. Series 2, another two-parter was shown in July and August 2026.

== Corporate affairs ==
Hotel Chocolat is led by co-founder Angus Thirlwell (CEO), a duty previously shared with co-founder Peter Harris up until Harris' retirement after the sale of the company to Mars

As of 30 September 2022, major shareholders in the company included its directors Angus Thirlwell (27.1%) and Peter Harris (27.1%), Phoenix Asset Management Partners (15.34%), and Capital Group Companies (6.23%). Since 25 January 2024, American confectionery maker Mars Inc. became the new owner of Hotel Chocolat.

== Locations ==
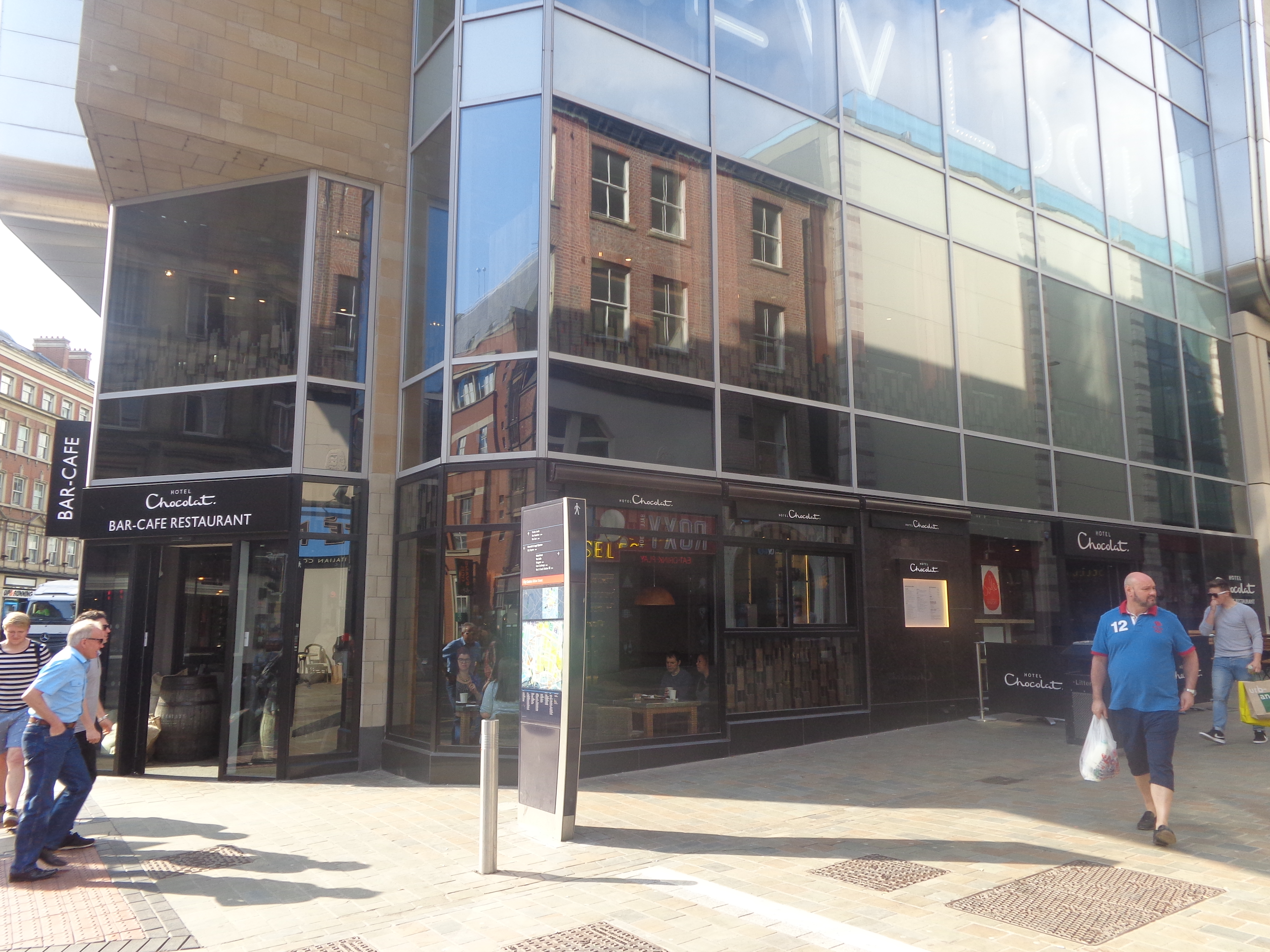
Hotel Chocolat store at Boar Lane, Leeds

Hotel Chocolat has 125 shops in the United Kingdom (as of January 2023) and 33 stores in Japan (as of May 2022). The company has twice entered the US market with their first attempt that consisted of five locations in New York having closed in 2022. It continued operation online and through a network of wholesalers before re-entering the US market with two stores in Chicago in 2025.

In November 2024, the company announced it plans on exiting the Republic of Ireland at the end of the year. The exit will result in the closure of two stores in Dublin.

== Products ==
The company produces a variety of chocolate-based confectionery, including regular chocolate bars, blocks, loose chocolates and a variety of seasonal and gift products. It also offers beverages like hot chocolates and alcohol. In 2022, the company launched a chocolate subscription service.

The Velvetiser was released in 2018 as the first, at-home hot chocolate machine, designed to heat & mix (Velvetise) milk, dairy or plant-based, and chocolate shavings to offer a coffee shop style drink at home.

== Rabot Estate ==
Hotel Chocolat owns and operates a 140-acre (0.57 km^{2}) estate in the southwest of St Lucia, near Soufrière. Rabot Estate is home to a luxury hotel and a cocoa plantation that is divided into 16 different areas. The cocoa trees of Rabot Estate are primarily Trinitario species.

== See also ==
- List of bean-to-bar chocolate manufacturers
