= Ahmet Piriştina =

Turkish politician (1952–2004)

24th Mayor of İzmir
- In office 18 April 1999 – 15 June 2004
- Preceded by: Burhan Özfatura
- Succeeded by: Aziz Kocaoğlu

Personal details
- Born: 8 April 1952 İzmir, Turkey
- Died: 15 June 2004 (aged 52) İzmir, Turkey
- Party: Republican People's Party (2003-04)
- Other political affiliations: Democratic Left Party (1994-2003)
- Relatives: Mergim Priştina Gülmen
- Occupation: Mayor of İzmir

Ahmet Piriştina (8 April 1952 – 15 June 2004) was a Turkish politician who was Mayor of İzmir from 1999 to 2004. His Family was of Albanian Turkish descent, his family was from the city of Prishtina.

Piriştina was born in İzmir, Turkey. He was elected as Mayor of İzmir in two consecutive elections, in 1999 and 2004. As mayor he became known in Izmir for keeping his electoral promises and being an honest politician. He died of a heart attack at the age of 52. Mayor Piriştina's image was draped by Izmir residents over buildings, monuments, boats and buses, while over a million people attended his funeral.

Political offices
Preceded by Burhan Özfatura	Mayor of İzmir; 1999–2004	Succeeded by Aziz Kocaoğlu
