= Aziz Kocaoğlu =

Turkish politician

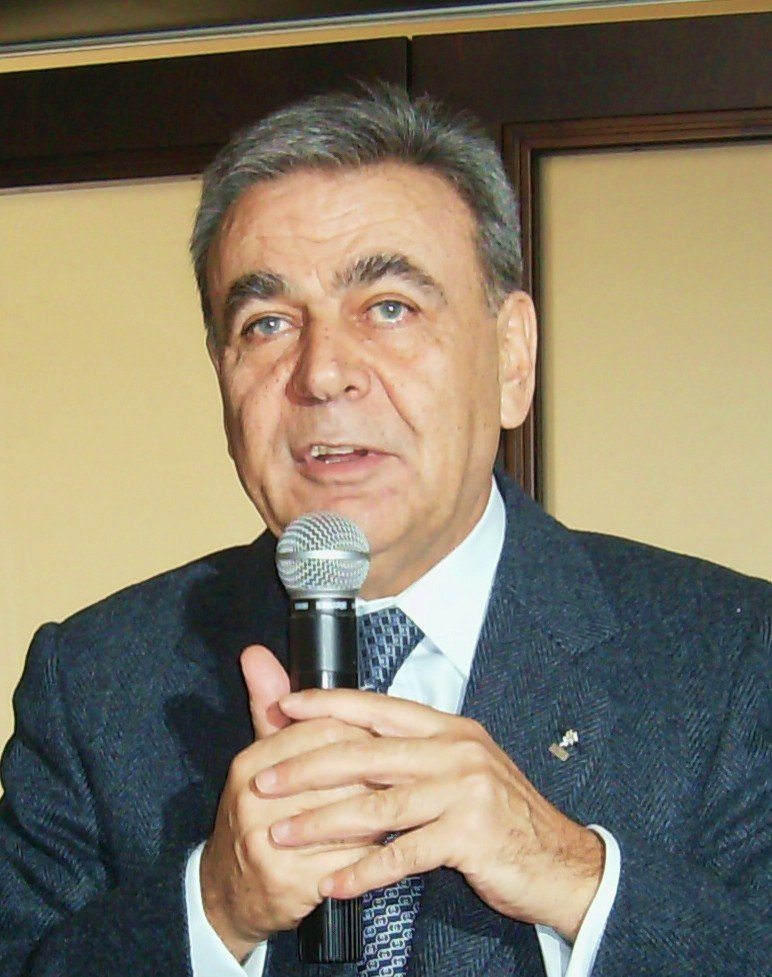

Mayor of İzmir
- In office 21 June 2004 – 31 March 2019
- Preceded by: Ahmet Piriştina
- Succeeded by: Tunç Soyer

Mayor of Bornova
- In office 28 March 2004 – 18 June 2004
- Preceded by: Cengiz Bulut
- Succeeded by: Sırrı Aydoğan

Personal details
- Born: 12 July 1948 (age 78) Erbaa, Tokat, Turkey
- Party: Republican People's Party
- Education: Ege University; Istanbul University

Aziz Kocaoğlu (Erbaa 12 July 1948) is a Turkish politician who was Mayor of İzmir, Turkey's third largest city, from 2004 to 2019.

== Life and career ==
He was born in 1948 at Erbaa in Tokat Province, a landlocked province in the Black Sea Region of Turkey. He graduated from the Economy School of İzmir's Ege University in 1973 and received a master's degree in management from Istanbul University in 1974. Between 1975 and 1978 he was an accountant in a public institution. In 1979, he launched his own business in furniture and ceramics. At the same time, he started his political activities in the frame of the youth branch of CHP. After the general interruption of political activities in the 1980s in Turkey, in 1987 he joined the SHP, which was the country's main center-left party at the time. After SHP and the re-established CHP were merged, he became a CHP member again, pursuing and developing his business activities at the same time.

Rising in the rank and file of Republican People's Party's İzmir branch, he was elected as Mayor of Bornova (a metropolitan district of İzmir) after the local elections of 28 March 2004. Following the sudden death of İzmir Metropolitan Municipality mayor Ahmet Piriştina, Kocaoğlu was elected by CHP's İzmir branch to the post of metropolitan mayor in June 2004.

Since then, although drawing a quieter profile than his predecessor, Aziz Kocaoğlu established himself with his orderly conduct of the city's affairs, sound financial management and smooth human relations, as exemplified during the Universiade 2005 games which İzmir had assumed.

On 1 October 2018, he announced that he would not be a candidate in the Turkish local elections, 2019 to be held on 31 March 2019.

Aziz Kocaoğlu is married and has two children.

Political offices
Preceded by Ahmet Piriştina	Mayor of İzmir; 2004–2019	Succeeded by Tunç Soyer
