= Cemil Tugay =

Turkish surgeon and politician (born 1967)

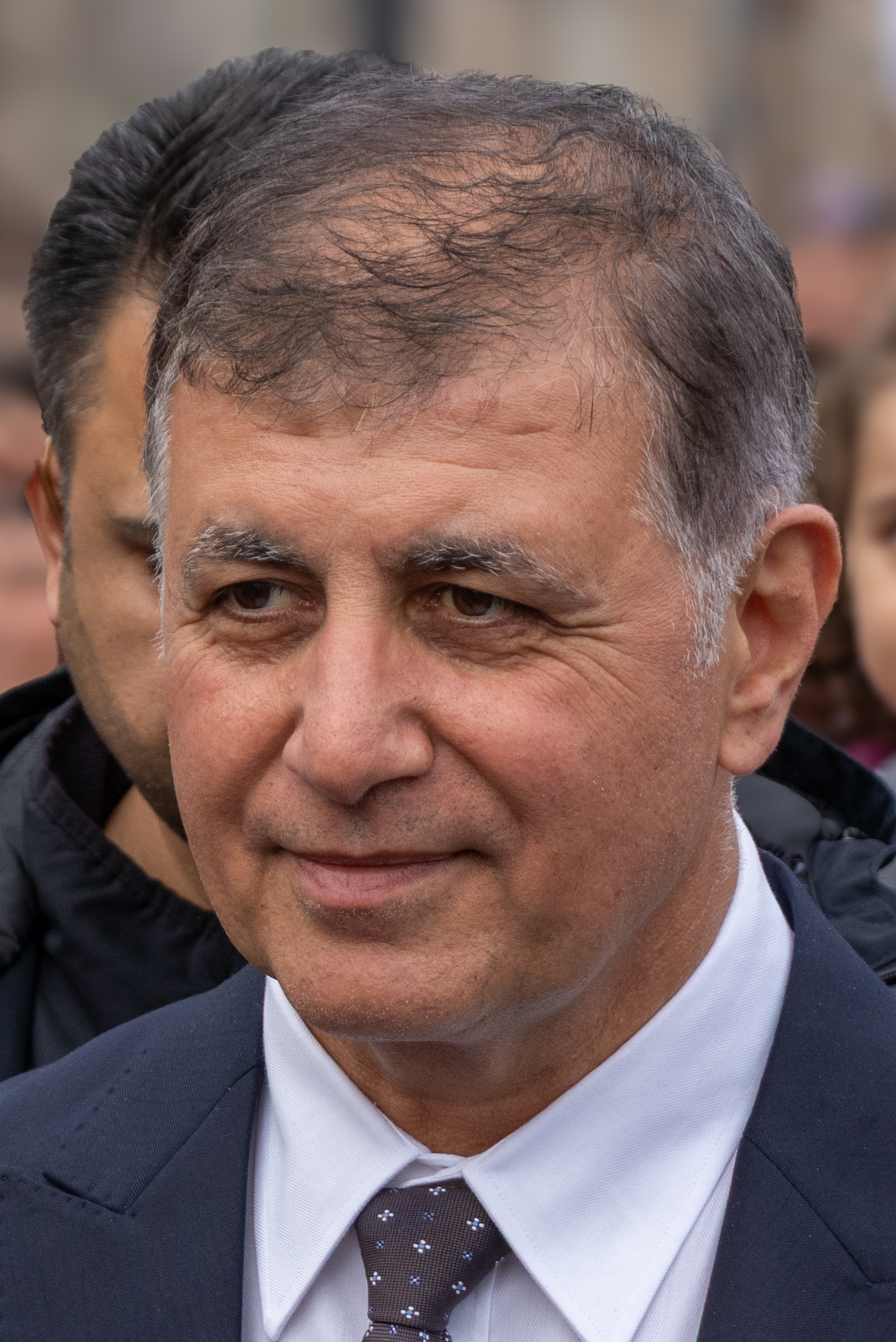

Mayor of İzmir
- Incumbent
- Assumed office 5 April 2024
- Preceded by: Tunç Soyer

Mayor of Karşıyaka
- In office 8 April 2019 – 3 April 2024
- Preceded by: Hüseyin Mutlu Akpınar
- Succeeded by: Behice Yıldız İşçimenler Ünsal

Personal details
- Born: Cemil Tugay; 13 June 1967 (age 59) Van, Turkey
- Party: AKP (2026-present)
- Other political affiliations: CHP (2010–2026)
- Children: 3
- Education: Ege University Faculty of Medicine
- Website: www.cemiltugay.com

Cemil Tugay (born 13 June 1967) is a Turkish medical surgeon and politician who has served as the 26th Mayor of Izmir since April 2024. A former member of the social democratic Republican People's Party from 2010 to 2026, when elected he succeeded Tunç Soyer from the same political background.

== Biography ==
Tugay was born in 1967 and studied at Ege University Faculty of Medicine from 1983 to 1989. Later, he went to work as a general practitioner. He afterwards completed his specialisation in plastic surgery in 2000.

In 2015, Tugay became involved in politics, working on electoral issues for the Karşıyaka District Executive Board.

In 2019, Tugay was nominated as a mayoral candidate for İzmir's Karşıyaka district. In April 2019, he was elected mayor, reportedly receiving more than 70% of votes cast.

In late 2023, Tugay was suggested as the candidate for mayor of Izmir, over the current incumbent. The announcement of his candidacy led to debate within the party, due to concerns about his relationship with certain companies close to the government. On 1 April 2024, Tugay was elected as mayor.

In June 2025, 23,000 Izmir municipal workers halted work for a week-long strike over contract negotiations with the city. In response, Tugay announced the city would enact forced layoffs.

A photo from October 10 2026, inside the municipal office of İzmir.

On June 18 he resigned from his party (CHP) citing the disagreements with the government friendly head of the party which was installed recently.
