= Body grooming =

Act of maintaining a clean appearance

Body grooming is the act of maintaining a clean appearance. It is typically associated with hair.

== Grooming today ==
Today, men and women around the world embrace body grooming as an essential part of their everyday routines. Once an activity limited to the daily morning shave of the face, grooming is now about the whole body from head to toe.

20% of men aged 15 to 90 in the United States and 50% of men in Germany of the same age shave, wax, sugar or trim hair below the neck. For men between 24 and 34 in the U.S., the number jumps to 30% and in Germany, the number reaches 40% among men between 20 and 34 years of age, with numbers still rising. Salons that cater to the grooming needs of men have opened up all over the world and offer services in a masculine environment.

== Grooming through the ages ==
Historically, body hair has been associated with virility, power and attractiveness, but the removal of body hair by men is not just a modern-day fad. In fact, hair removal has a traceable history that stretches as far back as ancient Egypt, where men and women would shave their bodies, heads and faces and priests ritualistically shaved their bodies every three days.

Back in the 5th century BC, the Greeks heralded the young, hairless, athletic man as beautiful while hairy bodies were considered hideous and associated with satyrs, barbarians and the cult of Dionysus.

The same ideal male image is found in the statue of David during the Renaissance, when Michelangelo explored classical imagery. The statue of David caused quite a stir because he signified power and beauty and had both genitals and pubic hair, which had not been seen before.

Between these periods, which favored Greek idealism, were more conservative and hairier times. With the rise of Christianity, the body was meant to be denied and the nude male body was seldom depicted.

For much of the late 19th century, long beards were en vogue and hair removal was frowned upon. The 1960s were also a major ‘hair milestone’ as hippies let hair of all kinds grow wild in contrast to the clean-cut military style during the Vietnam War. Hair and hairy chests were signs of eroticism and free love.

Women's Liberation was also a factor that influenced contemporary male grooming trends. As feminism led to the objectification of men in the 1960s and 1970s, women began to ogle men, buy Playgirl magazine and attend male strip shows for the first time.

During the 1990s, the idea of the perfect man as plucked, amply moisturized, clean-shaven and devoid of most body hair went mainstream and dominated major media from fashion magazines to television. The metrosexual period also made it socially acceptable for men to shave parts of their body that lay due south of their face and neck.

== Reasons for body grooming ==
Grooming is a matter of personal preference and men have numerous reasons for trimming or removing their body hair. For most men, being well-groomed means being more attractive to possible partners. In addition, men choose to remove body hair for hygiene purposes, sporting reasons, to show off their muscles, enhance the appearance of their body shape, for religious reasons, to express their personal style or to be up to date with the trends.

Body odor is also a potentially embarrassing grooming issue and a common reason for trimming or removing body hair. While it's not the hair itself that smells, body odor is caused by bacteria that grow in wet conditions when air is standing still. Hair reduces the amount of air exchange and traps sweat so it can support the growth of odor-causing bacteria.

Trimming or removing body hair, because it can provide a slight competitive edge, has long been popular among competitors in several sports. For swimmers, cyclists, and track athletes, body hair can slow them down by causing drag or wind resistance. Wrestlers remove hair so their opponents will have less to grab onto.

== Methods of body grooming ==
When it comes to hair on the face and body, there now exists much variation in how and what a man will groom. It's a personal choice and very individual.

=== Shaving ===
Shaving is the most commonly used hair removal technique. It involves taking a razor, manual or electric to remove hair.

=== Trimming ===
Electric trimmers involve shortening hair in certain body areas instead of getting rid of all of it.

=== Waxing ===
Waxing involves heated wax that is applied in the direction of hair growth over the skin. Hair becomes embedded in the wax as it cools and then quickly pulled off by a cloth or paper strip.

=== Sugaring ===
Sugaring is similar to waxing, except that sugaring does not always require strips and it's applied against the hair and removed with the hair for less breakage and damage to hair follicles. Sugar is not hot and there is no need to ever let it cool. By removing the hair in the earliest growth stage (anagen) sugar will help diminish regrowth by letting the follicles naturally shrink.

=== Tweezing ===
Plucking hair with tweezers is an effective way to remove hair but can be very time-consuming. The hair shaft must be long enough to grasp with tweezers.

=== Electrolysis ===
Electrolysis involves inserting a fine needle into the hair follicle and applying an electric current to the follicle root. This procedure burns the hair root, theoretically preventing it from producing more hair.

Laser treatment approved by the U.S. Food and Drug Administration involves a laser beam basically killing the hair follicles. Results depend on skin pigmentation and color of hair.

=== Depilatories ===
Depilatories use a chemical called thioglycolate mixed with sodium hydroxide or calcium hydroxide to literally melt the hair away.
