= CarrefourSA =

Turkish supermarket chain

CarrefourSA Carrefour Sabancı Trade Center S.A.
- Trade name: CarrefourSA
- Native name: CarrefourSA Carrefour Sabancı Ticaret Merkezi A.Ş.
- Type: Public
- Traded as: BİST: CRFSA
- Industry: Retail
- Founded: September 12, 1991; 35 years ago
- Headquarters: Istanbul, Turkey
- Number of locations: 1,236 stores List: 712 Mini/Express convenience stores; 448 Süper supermarkets; 57 Gurme health food stores; 19 Hiper hypermarkets; (2026)
- Area served: Turkey
- Key people: Cenk Alper (Chairman); Kutay Kartallıoğlu (CEO)
- Products: Convenience store; Health food store; Hypermarket; Supermarket; Warehouse club
- Revenue: ▲ ₺7.91 billion (2020)
- Net income: ▲ ₺304.1 million (2020)
- Owner: Turgut Aydın Holding (89,28%)
- Number of employees: 10,500
- Website: carrefoursa.com

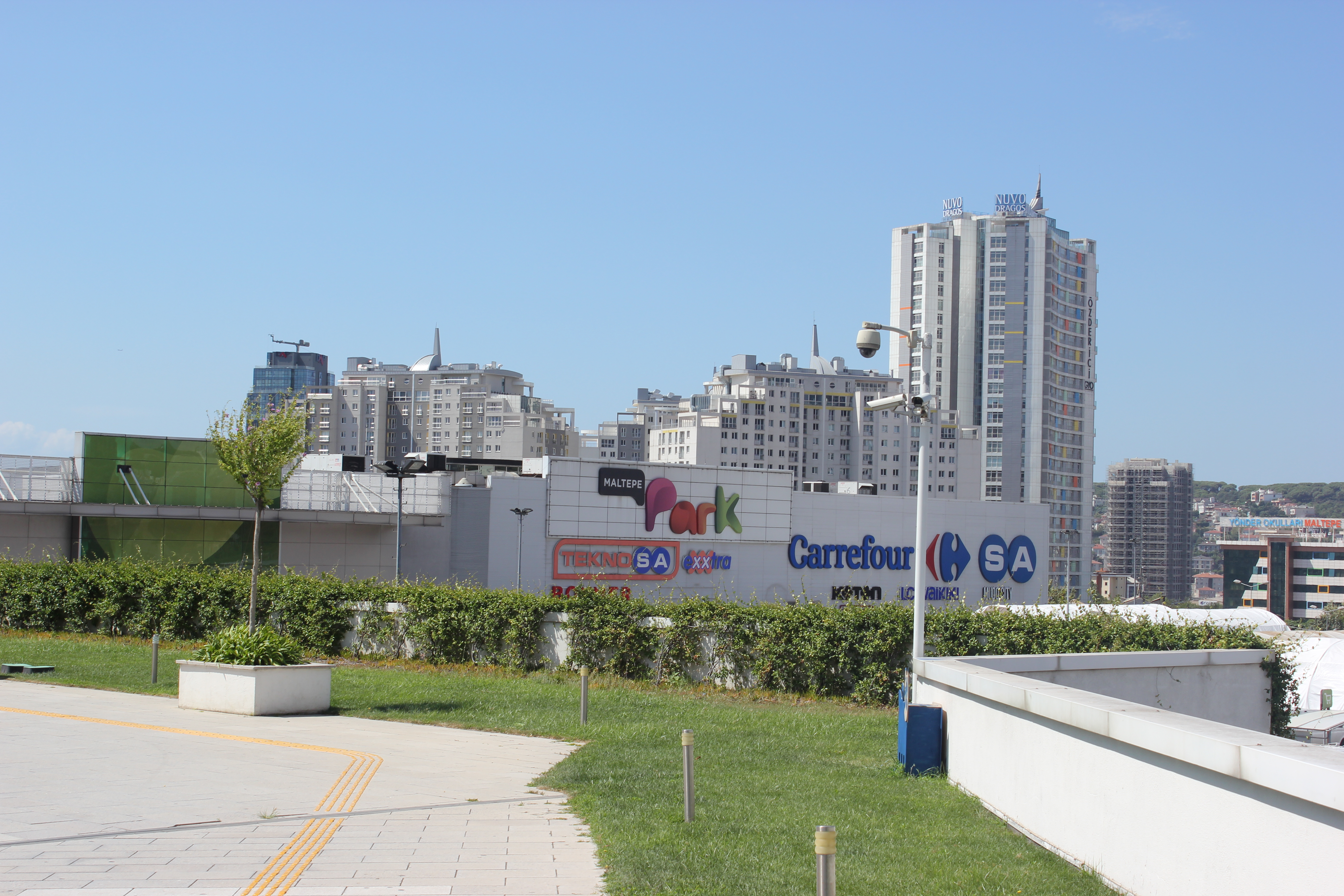
CarrefourSA Maltepe

CarrefourSA is a supermarket chain based in Turkey, founded in 1991 as a partnership between Sabancı Holding and Carrefour.

As of 2026, the company operates 1,236 stores in 79 provinces in Turkey.

== History ==
=== Carrefour ownership ===
Its first supermarket was opened in the İçerenköy district of Istanbul on 22 November 1993, simply under the name Carrefour. This market was also the first supermarket opened in Turkey. In 1996, the name CarrefourSA began to be used.

=== Sabancı Holding ownership ===
On July 25, 2013, Sabancı Holding purchased 12% more shares from Carrefour Nederland BV for ₺141 million (US$73 million), increasing its share to 50.8% and taking over the management. In July 2015, these shares were combined and started to be traded under a single share code.

=== Turgut Aydın Holding ownership ===
On April 17, 2026, A101 Yeni Mağazacılık A.Ş. announced the acquisition of the shares; the company officially separated from Sabancı Holding in July 2026 and passed to Turgut Aydın Holding.

== Operations ==
=== Current store formats ===
==== CarrefourSA Express ====
Convenience stores are mini-format retail outlets.

==== CarrefourSA Gurme ====
Health food stores cater to customers seeking gourmet products and culinary exploration with store sizes ranging from 161 to 2,233 square meters. Gurme locations offer premium selections from Turkish and global cuisines. The stores feature sections for vegan, gluten-free, diabetic-friendly, and organic products, as well as high-quality seafood, butcher goods, regional and imported cheeses, deli products, produce, and baked goods.

==== CarrefourSA Hiper ====
Hypermarkets range in size from 2,000 to 10,000 square meters and offer a comprehensive shopping experience with over 50,000 products, including fresh and packaged foods, textiles, electronics, personal care items, white goods, household cleaning products, kitchenware, books, music, stationery, and ready-to-wear clothing.

==== CarrefourSA Mini ====
Convenience stores are mini-format retail outlets with store sizes between 59 and 535 square meters, aiming to deliver a quick, efficient and streamlined shopping experience for urban and residential areas. These locations offer around 6,000 products including fresh foods and daily essentials.

==== CarrefourSA Profesyonel ====
Cash and carry stores offer tailored products within a business-to-business service model, focused on the horeca sector. Current locations include Antalya and Bodrum, aiming to expand to major cities including Istanbul. In 2024, CarrefourSA opened a 7,000-square-meter warehouse in Muğla to enhance logistics.

==== CarrefourSA Süper ====
Supermarkets serve local neighborhoods with store sizes ranging from 104 to 2,300 square meters. These stores feature specialized departments such as butcher, seafood, bakery, delicatessen, and produce, all tailored to the expectations of regional customers.

=== Defunct store formats ===
==== 1e1 ====
In March 2015, 29 stores of a supermarket chain called 1e1 were purchased for ₺31 million (US$12 million).

==== Alpark ====
CarrefourSA purchased 27 stores of Alpark, a local grocery chain affiliated with Saya Holding, for ₺45 million (US$29 million) in July 2010.

==== ChampionSA ====
Champion supermarket chain, another brand of Carrefour in France, was opened in Fulya in November 2000 under the name ChampionSA as its Turkish version. In 2007, as the name CarrefourSA was more preferred by customers, all ChampionSAs were converted into CarrefourSA Express markets.

==== Continent ====
Following the merger of French Promodès with Carrefour in 1999, 3 of Promodès' hypermarkets operating under the name Continent in Turkey joined CarrefourSA.

==== Endi and Gima ====
In 2005, Fiba Holding, which owned Gima and Endi, was negotiating for the sale of these two supermarket chains to Koç Holding. However, it was sold to CarrefourSA within three days after CarrefourSA offered US$132.5 million. Thus, on July 13, 2005, 65.33% of Gima and 34.95% of Endi were purchased and a total of 81 stores were taken over. Koç Holding reacted to this sudden sale. CarrefourSA has thereby entered the Istanbul stock exchange by purchasing Gima, a public company. After the merger with Gima, Gima shares were closed, and CarrefourSA shares began to be traded in 2 shares as of August 24, 2006.

==== Ismar ====
In February 2015, 26 stores of Ismar, a local grocery chain, were purchased.

==== Kiler ====
In May 2015, Kiler, a local grocery chain owned by Kiler Holding with 201 stores, was purchased for ₺429 million (US$162 million).

== Private label brands ==
CarrefourSA offers a portfolio of over 650 private label products as of 2024, with a 65% increase in sales compared to the previous year. Private label products undergo an 8-stage quality control process. CarrefourSA has received multiple international awards in 2024, including three from the International Taste Awards and Private Label Manufacturers Association. Key private labels include:

=== Bonheur ===
Sweets and healthy alternatives such as dried fruits and protein bars.

=== Carrefour Eco ===
Environmentally conscious products. Notably, the Carrefour Eco Planet Charcoal, made from hazelnut shells, won a Stevie Award for sustainability.

=== Carrefour Kids & Veggie ===
Healthy snacks like chickpea chips.

=== Carrefour Selection ===
Premium selections.

=== Others ===
- Les Actions
- Oui Voila
- Qualt

== See also ==
- Migros
- File
