= Crew Clothing =

British clothing retailer

Crew Clothing Company Ltd.
- Type: public
- Industry: Apparel
- Founded: 1993; 33 years ago
- Headquarters: London, England, UK
- Key people: Louise Barnes; Alistair Parker-Swift/Michael Shina
- Products: Apparel, Clothing
- Website: crewclothing.co.uk

Crew Clothing is a British clothing retailer that specialises in casual wear, shoes and accessories for men and women, selling through stores and by mail order. The company describes its clothes as being British-inspired and influenced by British casual wear, sporting and yachting traditions.

The company was started in 1993 by Alistair Parker-Swift. In the early 1990s, he spent the summer months running a windsurfing school in Salcombe in Devon. During the summer of 1993 he created some navy and white rugby shirts, sourcing the materials from a local supplier. Later he sold clothing at Cowes Week on the Isle of Wight, a regatta event, and then opened a store. The first London store opened on the New King's Road in 1995. As of 2014, the company's chief executive was Louise Barnes, and major shareholders included founder Alistair Parker-Swift and private equity group Livingbridge.

== Gallery ==
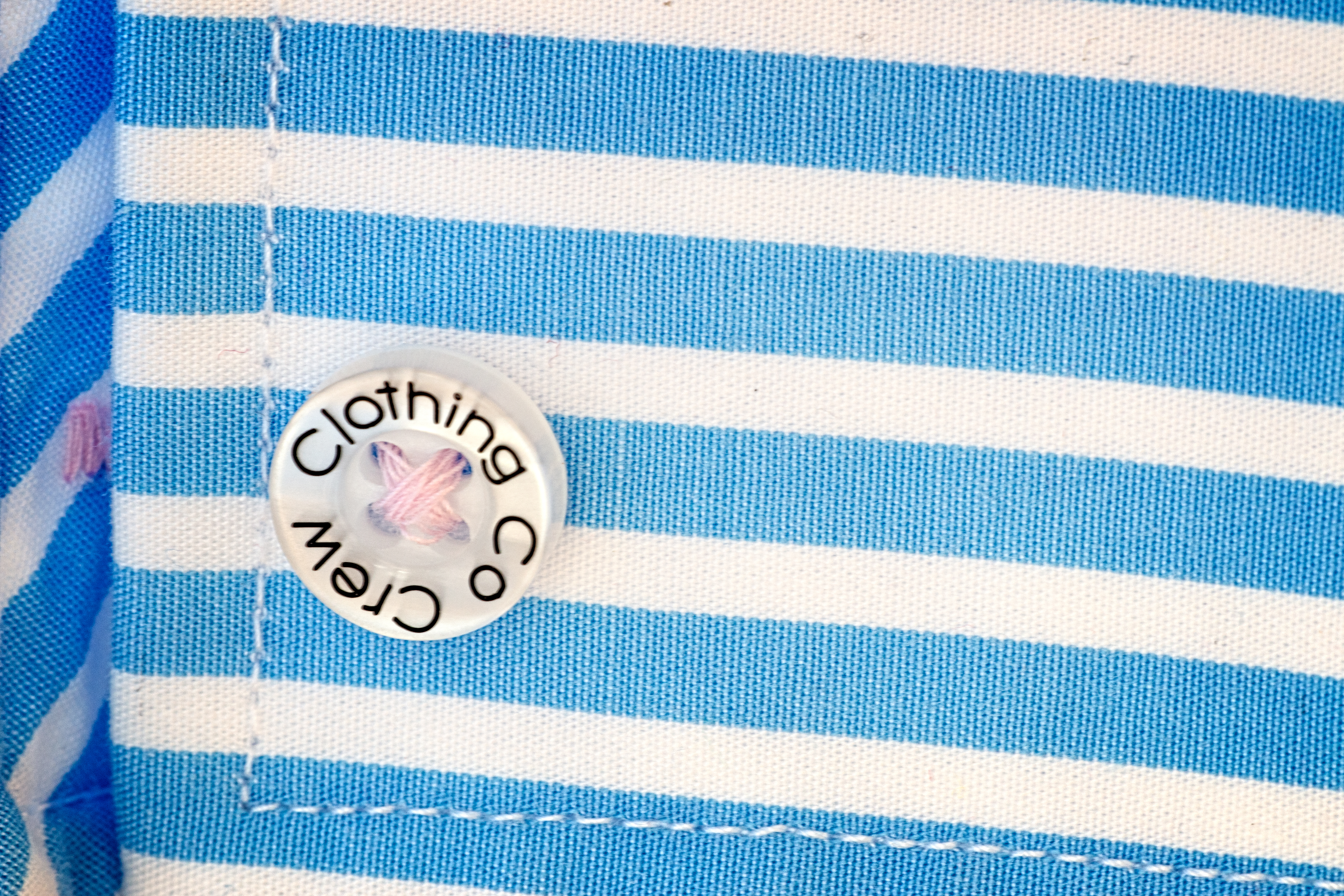
Detail of a casual shirt made by Crew Clothing

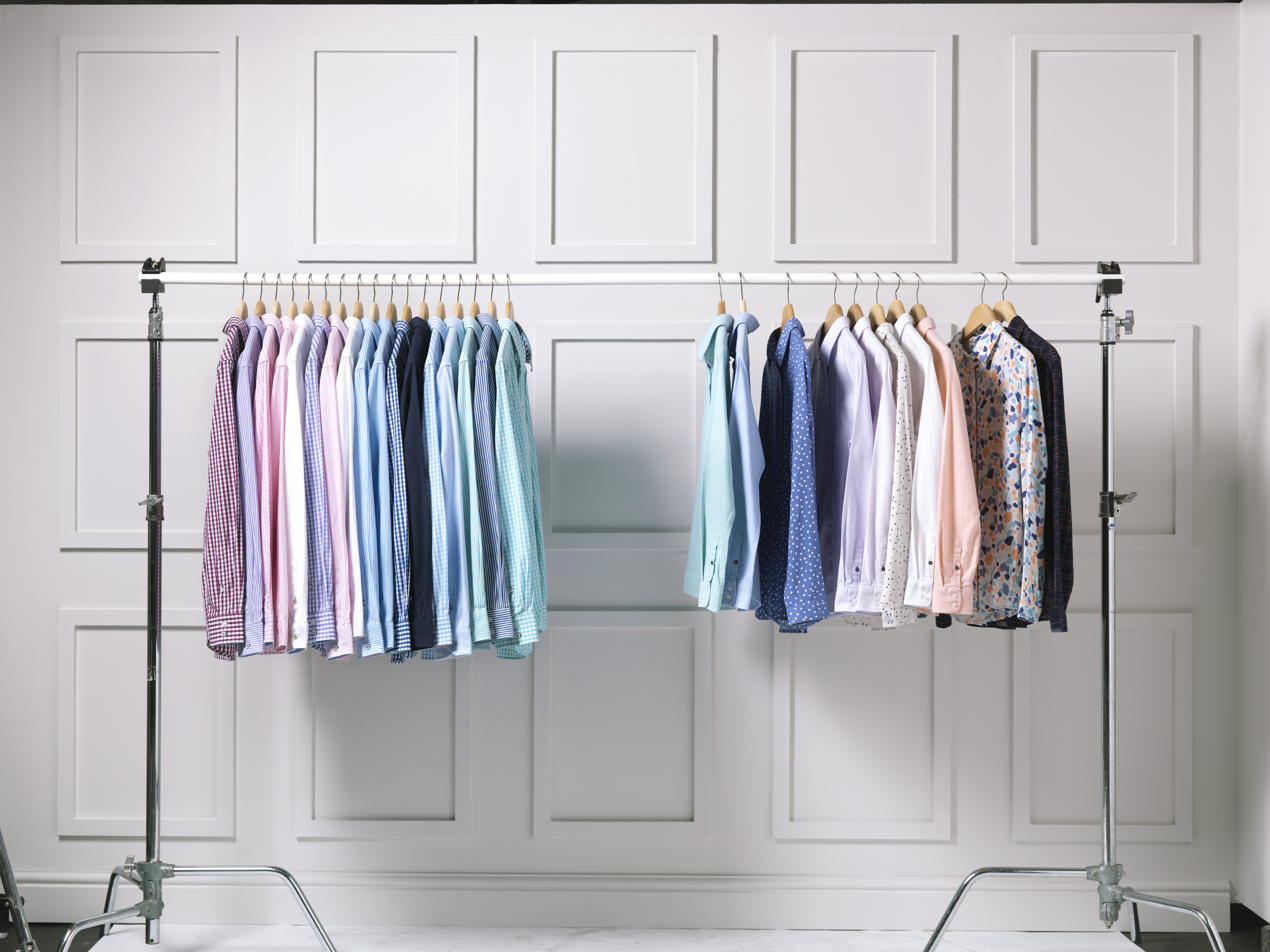
Shirts made by Crew Clothing

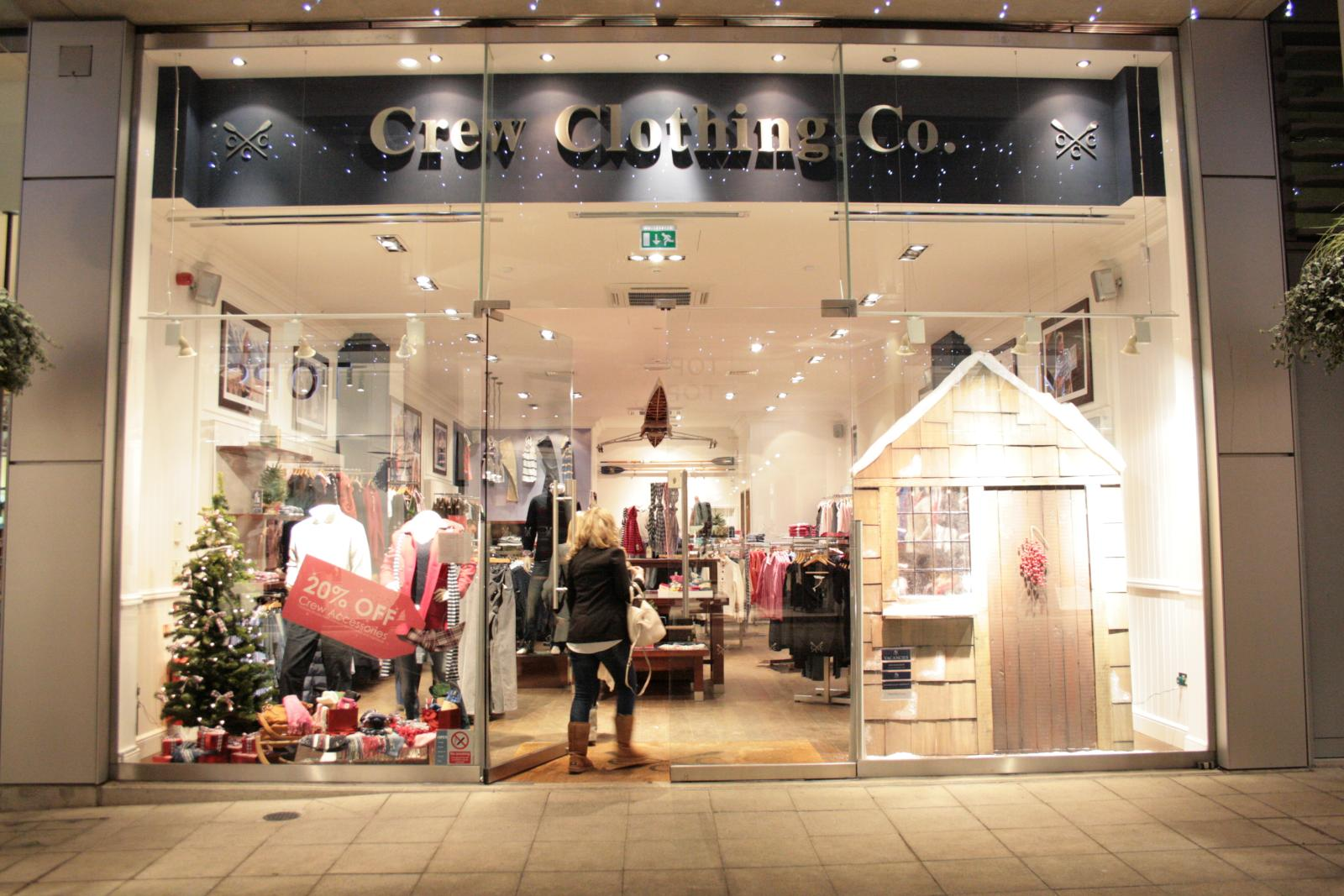
A Crew Clothing shop in Bury St. Edmunds, in 2010.
