= Burhan Özfatura =

Turkish politician (1943–2026)

Burhan Özfatura (8 June 1943 – 21 September 2026) was a Turkish politician. He was mayor of Izmir from 1984 to 1989 and from 1994 to 1999.

Özfatura died from a cardiac arrest on 21 September 2026, at the age of 83.
