= The Agricultural Credit Cooperatives of Turkey =

Farmers' cooperative

- Türkiye Tarım Kredi Kooperatifleri
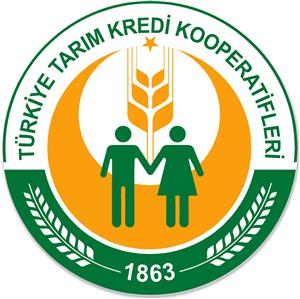

Agency overview
- Formed: 1863; 163 years ago
- Headquarters: Ankara
- Agency executives: Murat Kumaş, Chairman; İrfan Güvendi, Director General
- Website: www.tarimkredi.org.tr

The Agricultural Credit Cooperatives of Turkey (the ACC) is an agricultural cooperative founded by producers on the basis of mutual aid to protect their economic interests and to provide their subsistence and business related needs. Established to benefit from the provisions of law number 1581 on Agricultural Credit Cooperatives and Unions, the Agricultural Credit Cooperatives of Turkey is a legal entity with replaceable members and capital.

== History ==
The foundation of the Agricultural Credit Cooperatives of Turkey dates back to 1863. The Turkish cooperative movement was started by Midhat Pasha, governor of Niš which was Ottoman territory at the time, with the establishment of “Homeland Funds” (“Memleket Sandıkları”) in 1863 and it gained pace with the foundation of the Republic of Turkey as new laws on cooperatives were enacted. The ACC with its modern nomenclature and structure was established based on law number 2836 which was passed in 1935. The ACC’s foundation was supported by the first president of the Republic of Turkey Kemal Atatürk who was also the first member of the cooperative in Silifke – Tekir Çiftliği. Due to the enforcement of law number 1581 on Agricultural Credit Cooperatives and Unions in 1972, the ACC was able to form regional unions and a central union, which set the basis for a vertical organizational structure.

The ACC operated under Türkiye Cumhuriyeti Ziraat Bankası (Agricultural Bank of the Republic of Turkey) until May 17, 1977, when the Central Union of Agricultural Credit Cooperatives of Turkey was officially opened. Since then Ziraat Bankası has had no managerial responsibilities towards the Agricultural Credit Cooperatives of Turkey, yet it has been acting as the ACC’s financing bank. Even though the ACC went under the overall responsibilities of the Ministry of Food, Agriculture and Livestock for a decade (1985–1995), today it is an independent farmer organization which owes its current democratic structure to the law number 5330 enacted in 2005.

== Operations ==
=== Retail ===
The Agricultural Credit Retail S.A.
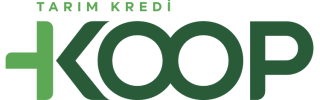
- Native name: Tarım Kredi Marketçilik A.Ş.
- Type: Subsidiary
- Industry: Retail
- Founded: March 1, 2017; 9 years ago
- Headquarters: Ankara, Turkey
- Number of locations: 4,000 stores List: 2,390 Çiftçi Marketi/Gross/Kooperatif Market; 1,610 Bakkal; (2025)
- Parent: The Agricultural Credit Cooperatives of Turkey
- Website: https://www.tkkoop.com.tr/

Tarım Kredi stores operate on a cooperative model, sourcing products directly from member farmers. This direct supply chain minimizes intermediaries, reducing costs and ensuring that farmers receive fair compensation for their produce. The product range includes fresh fruits and vegetables, dairy products, grains, legumes, and other essential food items. Regular promotional campaigns are held, offering discounts on various products. As of 2025, Tarım Kredi Koop has expanded its network to over 4,000 locations across Turkey, making it one of the largest retail chains in the country.

=== Current store formats ===
==== Tarım Kredi Koop Bakkal ====
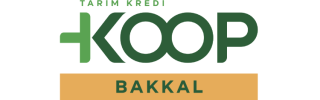
Logo since 2024

Tarım Kredi Koop Bakkal is a retail partnership model launched by the ACC in 2022, aimed at integrating neighborhood grocery stores (bakkals) into the network. It reflects a hybrid model that combines the reach of local grocery stores with the product supply and price stability of cooperative markets. The initiative is particularly focused on rural and lower-income urban neighbourhoods, aiming to reach underserved populations. The initiative allows small shopkeepers to sell Tarım Kredi’s products. Shop owners benefit from increased foot traffic and product diversity, while consumers gain access to affordable essentials close to home.

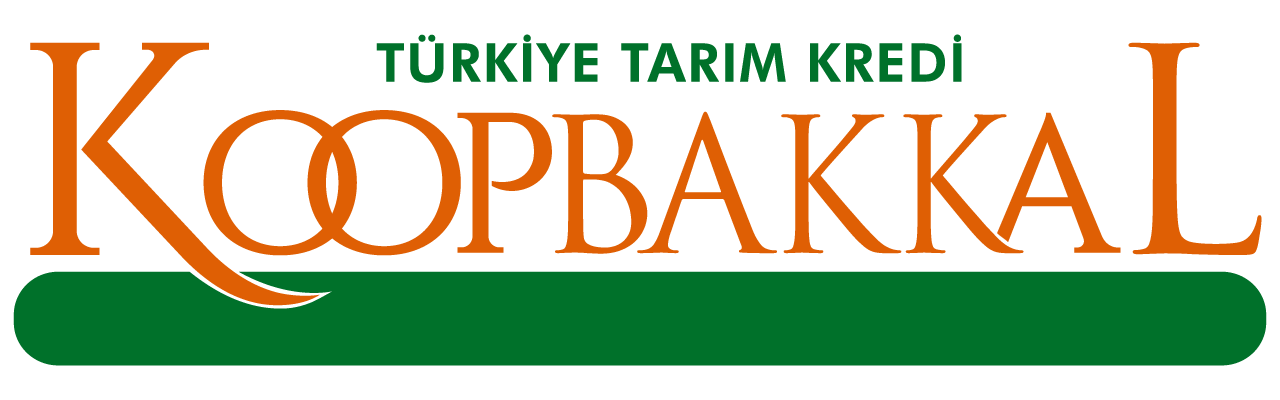
Logo from 2022 to 2024

These stores receive a standardised stock of 132 basic consumer goods, including flour, oil, sugar, legumes, dairy, and hygiene products. Koop Bakkals sell products supplied by Tarım Kredi at the same prices as Tarım Kredi Koop Markets. Prices are regulated and often lower than market averages due to state-supported pricing mechanisms. As of 2024, the Koop Bakkal program has expanded to 366 locations in 23 provinces, with ongoing plans to reach 1,000 stores nationwide.

==== Tarım Kredi Koop Çiftçi Marketi ====
Logo since 2024

Koop Çiftçi Marketi (literally “Farmers' Market”) is a retail chain in Turkey established in 2025, emphasising the ACC's commitment to serving both farmers and consumers. These stores stock approximately 1,700 products.

==== Tarım Kredi Kooperatif Market ====
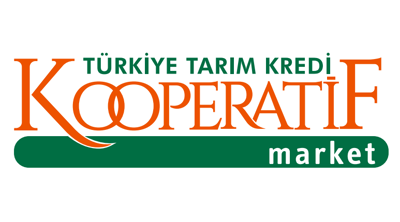
Logo from 2017 to 2024

Kooperatif Market (literally “Cooperative Market”) is a retail chain in Turkey established in 2017. Tarım Kredi Kooperatif Market chain rebranded as Tarım Kredi Koop Çiftçi Marketi in 2025.

==== Tarım Kredi Koop Gross ====
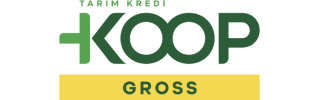
Logo since 2024

Established as part of the ACC's broader retail strategy in 2017, Koop Gross stores offer wholesale shopping. These stores are strategically located to serve a wide customer base, including individual consumers and small businesses. As of 2025, Koop Gross has established a significant presence in major Turkish cities, including Istanbul, Ankara, and Izmir.

==== Tarim Kredi Sıfır Market ====
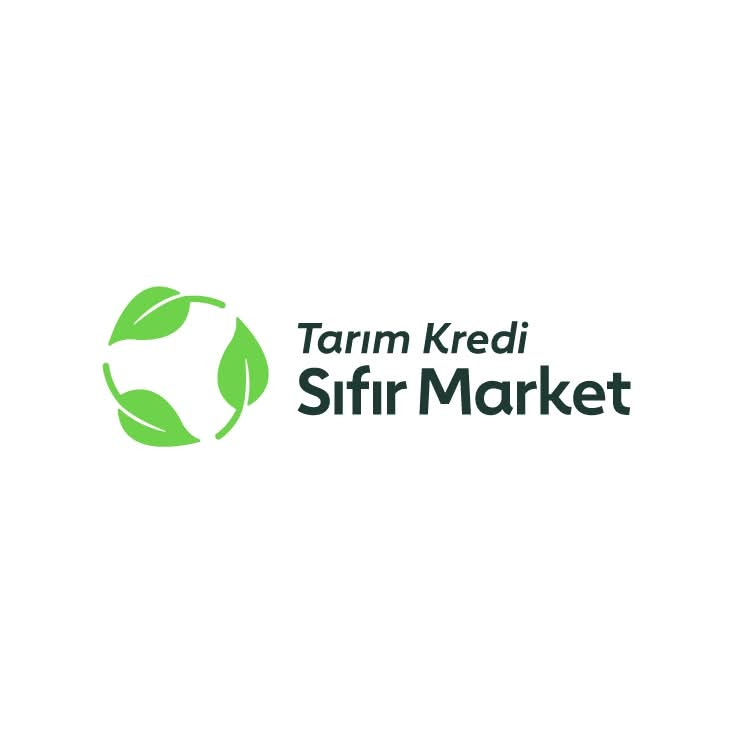
Logo since 2024

Tarım Kredi Sıfır Market is a zero-waste retail initiative launched by the ACC in 2024. The concept encourages sustainable shopping practices by enabling customers to purchase goods using their own reusable containers, thereby reducing single-use packaging waste. The first Sıfır Market (literally “Zero Market”) was opened in Beytepe, Ankara, in July 2024 as part of a broader sustainability and public awareness campaign spearheaded by the Tarım Kredi Cooperative Market chain. The initiative aims to promote environmental consciousness among consumers while also providing economic benefits through lower prices on unpackaged goods.The Sıfır Market model incorporates various elements of zero-waste retailing:

- Refill and bulk sales: Customers are encouraged to bring their own packaging to purchase goods such as raw milk, legumes, dried fruits and nuts, liquid soap, detergent, and sunflower oil. These items are sold in bulk, and prices are reduced by approximately 5% to 20% compared to packaged alternatives.
- Automated refill stations: Some products, including milk, oil, and detergents, are available via self-service vending machines. Customers using their own containers benefit from additional discounts.
- Recycling incentives: An in-store bottle return machine offers customers ₺0.50 off their purchases for each returned plastic bottle.
- Digital receipts: To minimize paper waste, customers may opt to receive purchase receipts via SMS instead of printed slips, aligning with broader zero-waste goals.
- QR code tracking: The stores also implement the Ministry of Agriculture and Forestry’s QR code system to provide traceability for food products, a feature being expanded across all Tarım Kredi Markets.

As of mid-2024, Tarım Kredi announced plans to expand the Sıfır Market concept to a total of ten locations across major cities, including Istanbul, İzmir, Bursa, Konya, and Ankara. The long-term goal is to integrate the model into broader cooperative retail operations throughout Turkey. The Tarım Kredi Sıfır Market represents one of the first significant efforts in Turkey to mainstream zero-waste principles in the retail sector. The initiative is notable for combining environmental responsibility with consumer savings, and it serves as a model for similar efforts in developing cooperative and sustainable retail systems.

== Private label brands ==
=== Tarım Kredi ===
Main private label

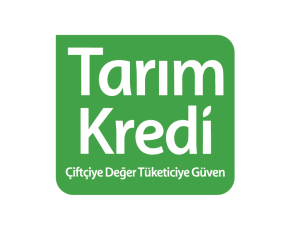
Tarım Kredi logo

=== Tarım Kredi Anadolu ===
Food

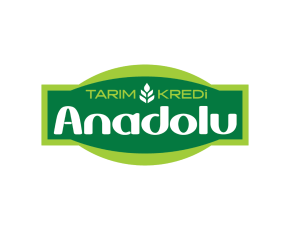
Tarım Kredi Anadolu logo

=== Tarım Kredi Birlik Gurme ===
Gourmet products

=== Tarım Kredi elit ===
Home and personal care

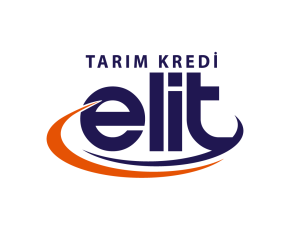
Tarım Kredi elit logo

=== Tarim Kredi TarSüt ===
Dairy products

== Organizational structure ==
The Agricultural Credit Cooperatives of Turkey renders service to its 1.1 million members with 16 regional unions and 1625 cooperatives, 188 service offices and 7244 personnel. Agricultural Credit Cooperatives of Turkey is managed by the Board of Directors elected by its members.

== Regulations ==
Law Number 1581 on Agricultural Credit Cooperatives and Unions.

== Articles of Association ==
Articles of Association of the Agricultural Credit Cooperatives of Turkey.
