= Şok =

Turkish discount supermarket chain

ŞOK Markets Trade A.Ş.
- Native name: ŞOK Marketler Ticaret A.Ş.
- Type: Public
- Traded as: BİST: SOKM
- Industry: Discount store
- Founded: 1995; 31 years ago
- Headquarters: Istanbul, Turkey
- Number of locations: 11,074 (2025)
- Area served: Turkey
- Key people: Uğur Demirel (Chairman)
- Products: Basic food items and consumer goods
- Revenue: US$4.7 billion (2023)
- Net income: US$191 million (2023)
- Total assets: US$2.1 billion (2024)
- Total equity: US$869 million (2023)
- Number of employees: 46,796 (2023)
- Parent: Yıldız Holding
- Website: sokmarket.com.tr

ŞOK Marketler Ticaret A.Ş. is a discount market chain based in Turkey. It was founded by Migros in 1995 and was acquired by a consortium led by Gözde Girişim, one of Yıldız Holding companies, in August 2011. It is headquartered in Üsküdar district of Istanbul.

As of 2025, the company operates 11,057 stores in Turkey.

== History ==
=== Migros ownership ===
ŞOK Marketler Ticaret A.Ş. started its operations in 1995 by opening 13 stores. The aim was to establish a widespread network of small-sized stores that were cheap and low-cost, and to employ fewer personnel and reduce costs with the features of the shelving system.

Under Migros Ticaret A.Ş., Şok Market reached 291 stores in 2000, 311 stores in 2005, and 1,254 stores in 2010.

=== Yıldız Holding ownership ===
In August 2011, it was acquired by a consortium led by Gözde Girişim, a company of Yıldız Holding. With the acquisition, Şok Market completely renewed its concept and redesigned its stores from top to bottom. In 2015, the company decided to resume its expansion strategy, and reached 4,000 stores at the end of 2016.

It entered the internet industry in 2021 and founded Şok Net.

== Private label brands ==
Şok has 25 private label brands.

- Adam for Men — male grooming
- Altın Küp — sugar
- Amigo — nuts, peanut butter, and chips
- Anadolu Mutfağı — legumes, eggs, spices
- Bebe land — baby products
- Beyaz Güvercin — paper products
- Bisto — baked goods
- Bizim Vatan — canned goods and sauces (founded in 1951)
- Bozüyük — boza
- Crown — soft drinks, lemonade, iced tea
- Deren — tea and iced tea
- Experdent — oral care
- Evin — margarine and vegetable oil
- İnci — frozen foods
- Karmen — chocolate and hazelnut spread
- Lezzetlim — red meat
- Lio — olives and olive oil
- Mintax — cleaning products (Turkey's first local detergent brand, absorbed in 2012)
- Mis — dairy (founded in 1976, absorbed in 2012)
- Mon Amour — cosmetics
- Peki — cakes and wafers
- Piyale — pasta, soup, flour, and pudding (founded in 1922, absorbed in 2010)
- Taşkale — tahini, molasses and halva
- Tempo — biscuits and crackers
- Tornado — energy drink
