= File (company) =

Turkish discount supermarket chain

File Market Retail S.A.
- Native name: File Market Mağazacılık A.Ş.
- Type: Subsidiary
- Industry: Retail
- Founded: 2015; 11 years ago
- Number of locations: 364 stores (2026)
- Area served: Turkey
- Key people: Haluk Dörtlüoğlu
- Products: Supermarket
- Brands: Actisoft; Daycare; Harras
- Number of employees: 4,000 (2021)
- Parent: Bim
- Website: file.com.tr

File is a Turkish retail company founded in 2015, owned by Bim.

As of 2026, the company operates 364 supermarkets in 37 provinces in Turkey.

== History ==
In 2015, BİM wanted to invest in the supermarket category after claiming their title as one of the dominant companies in the Turkish discount store industry, thus founding FİLE. The company's first store was opened inside the Prestige Shopping Mall in Başakşehir, İstanbul.

In 2021, the company developed a grocery delivery app called "File Market". As of April 2021, the company has 135 locations in Turkey and around 4,000 employees.

== Operations ==
Unlike BİM’s traditional discount model, FİLE offers a broader range of products and a more modern store concept. Rather than offering special sale days, FİLE follows an everyday low pricing strategy.

Each store typically offers between 4,000 and 4,500 different food, personal care, and household cleaning products. Food products include:

- Fresh meat and deli products
- Fruits and vegetables
- Baked goods

== Private label brands ==
=== ActiSoft ===
Home care products

=== Daycare ===
Personal care products

=== Harras ===
Food products
