= List of universities in Istanbul =

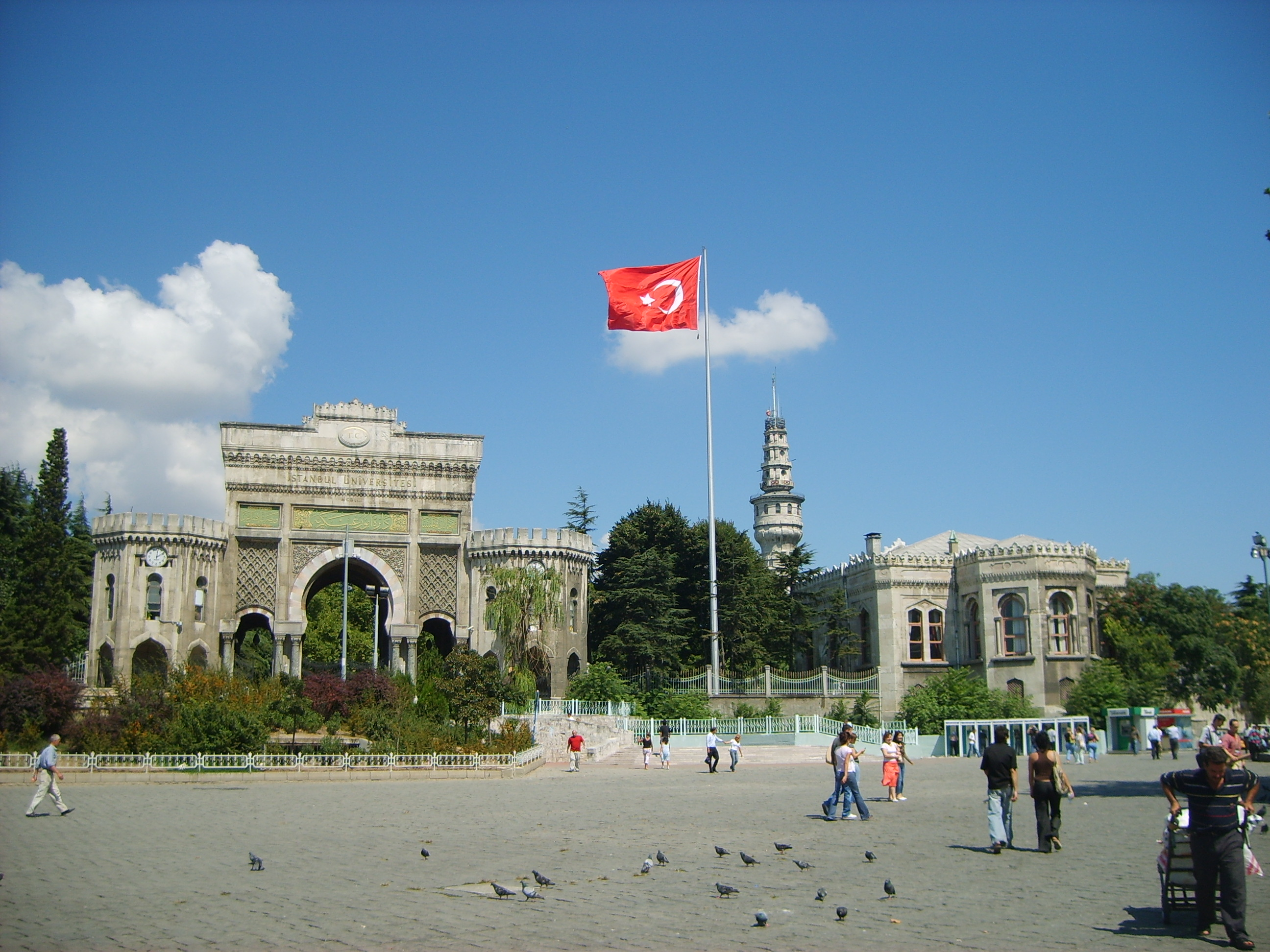
Istanbul University is the oldest university in Turkey.

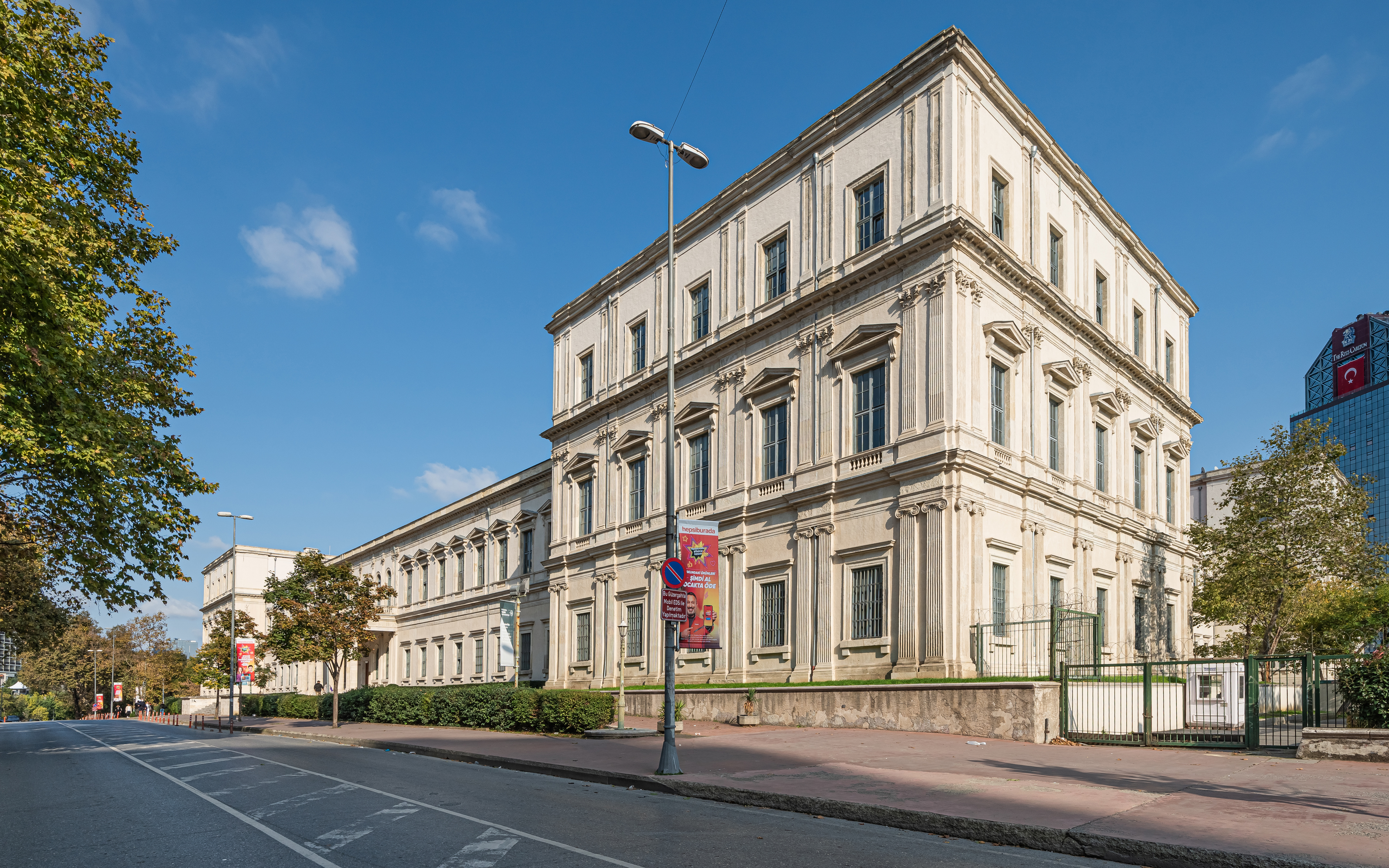
Istanbul Technical University one of the oldest technical universities in the world

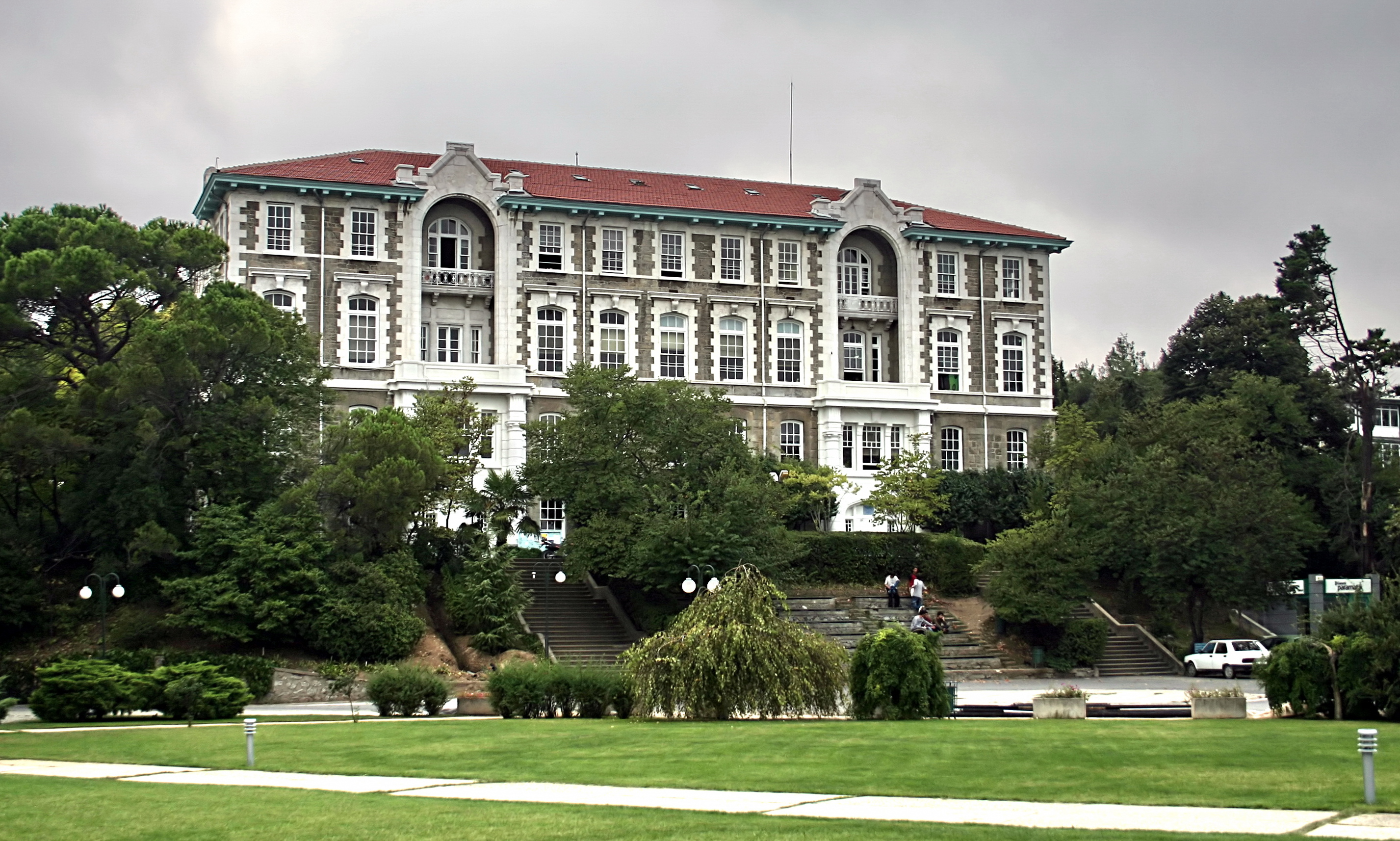
Boğaziçi University

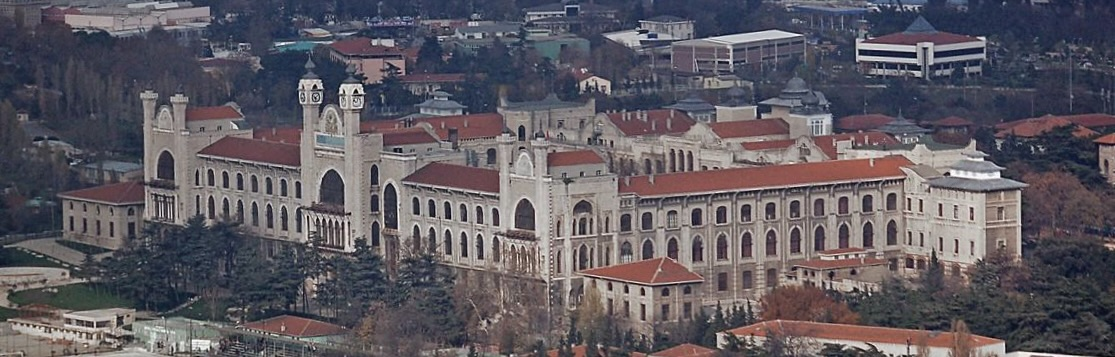
Marmara University

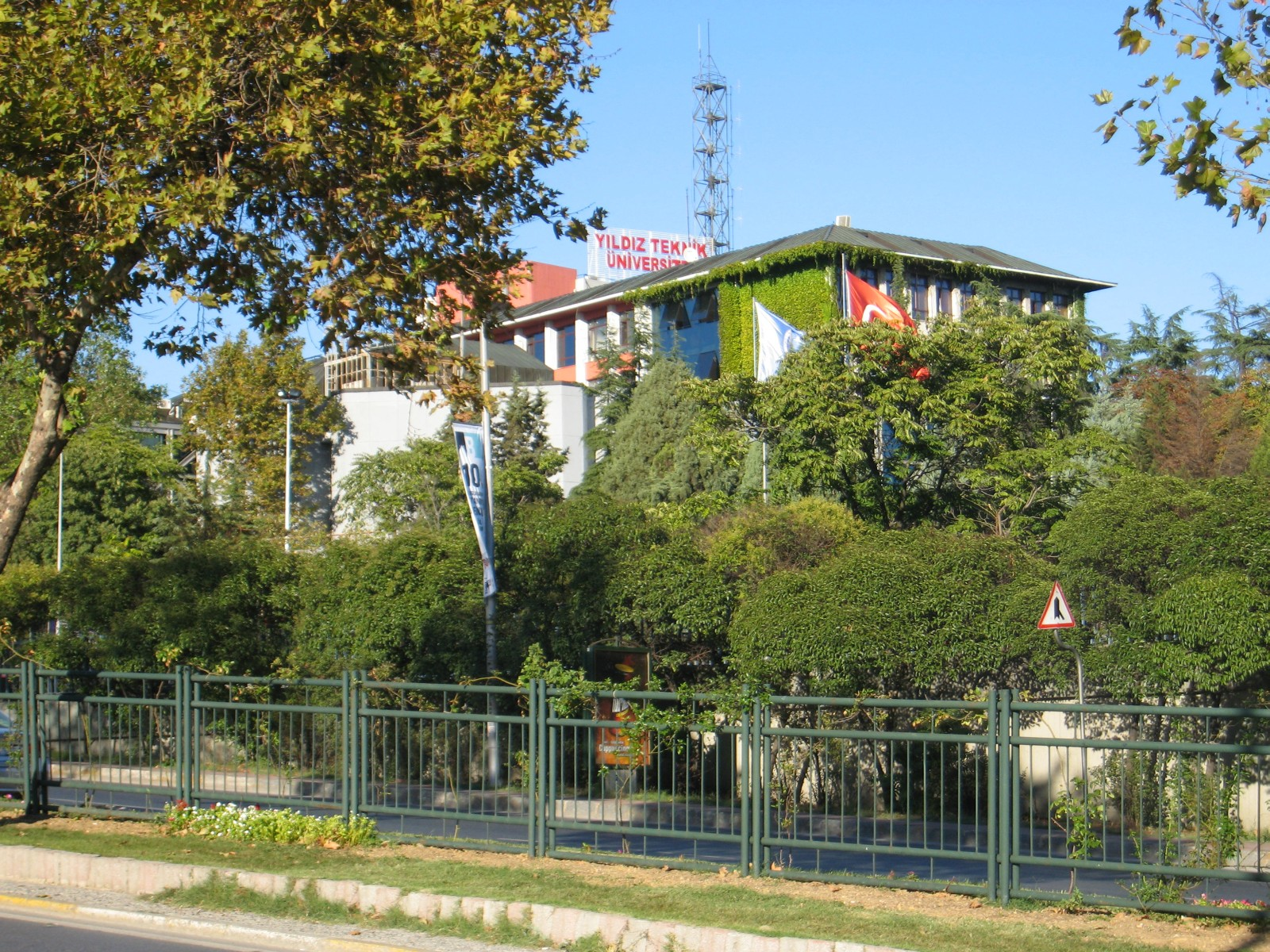
Yıldız Technical University

This list of universities in Istanbul lists the accredidated universities by YÖK (Council of Higher Education) within the city limits of Istanbul.

== Public universities ==
Name	Year of foundation
Istanbul University	1453
Istanbul University-Cerrahpaşa	2018
Boğaziçi University	1863
Galatasaray University	1992
Istanbul Medeniyet University	2010
Istanbul Technical University	1773
Marmara University	1883
Mimar Sinan Fine Arts University	1882
Yıldız Technical University	1911
University of Health Sciences	2015
National Defense University	2016
Turkish-German University	2013
Turkish-Japanese Science and Technology University	2017

== Private universities ==
Name	Year of Foundation	Founder Foundation
Acıbadem University	2007	Acıbadem Health and Education Foundation
Altınbaş University	2008	Mehmet Altınbaş Education and Culture Foundation
Bahçeşehir University	1998	Bahçeşehir Uğur Education Foundation
Beykoz University	2016	Turkey Logistics Research and Education Foundation
Bezmialem Vakıf University	2010	Bezm-i Alem Foundation
Biruni University	2014	World Education Foundation
Demiroğlu Bilim University	2006	Turkish Cardiology Foundation
Doğuş University	1997	Doğuş Education Foundation
Fatih Sultan Mehmet Vakıf University	2010	Fatih Sultan Mehmet Foundation
Fenerbahçe University	2016	Fenerbahçe Education, Culture and Health Foundation
Haliç University	1998	Our-Children Leukemia Foundation
Ibn Haldun University	2015	Turkish Youth and Education Service Foundation
Istanbul 29 Mayıs University	2010	Turkish Piety Foundation
Istanbul Arel University	2007	Kemal Gözükara Education and Culture Foundation
Istanbul Atlas University	2018	Turkish Balkan Education Culture and Health Foundation
Istanbul Aydın University	2007	Anadolu Education and Culture Foundation
Istanbul Beykent University	1997	Adem Çelik-Beykent Education Foundation
Istanbul Bilgi University	1996	Bilgi Education and Culture Foundation
Istanbul Commerce University	1992	Istanbul Chamber of Commerce Education and Social Services Foundation
Istanbul Esenyurt University	2013	Yeşilköy 2001 Education, Culture and Health Foundation
Istanbul Galata University	2019	Bulut Education Foundation
Istanbul Gedik University	2019	Gedik Education Foundation
Istanbul Gelişim University	2010	Gelişim Education, Culture, Health, and Social Service Foundation
Istanbul Health and Technology University	2018	Bilgiç Foundation
Istanbul Kent University	2016	Accessible Education Foundation
Istanbul Kültür University	1997	Kültür College Education Foundation
Istanbul Medipol University	2009	Medipolitan Education and Health Foundation
Istanbul Nişantaşı University	2012	Engin Fikirler Education and Culture Foundation
Istanbul Okan University	1999	Okan Culture, Education and Sports Foundation
Istanbul Rumeli University	2015	Balcı Foundation
Istanbul Sabahattin Zaim University	2010	İlim Yayma Foundation
Istanbul Topkapı University	2009	Plato Foundation
Istanbul Yeni Yüzyıl University	2009	Vatan Health and Education Foundation
Işık University	1996	Feyziye Mektepleri Foundation
İstinye University	2015	21st Century Anatolia Foundation
Kadir Has University	1992	Kadir Has Foundation
Koç University	1992	Vehbi Koç Foundation
Maltepe University	1997	Istanbul Marmara Education Foundation
MEF University	2012	İbrahim Arıkan Education and Scientific Research Foundation
Özyeğin University	2007	Hüsnü M. Özyeğin Foundation
Piri Reis University	2008	Turkish Maritime Education Foundation
Sabancı University	1996	Sabancı Foundation
Üsküdar University	2011	Human Values and Mental Health Foundation
Yeditepe University	1996	İstanbul Education and Culture Foundation

== Private vocational schools ==
Name	Year of Foundation	Founder Foundation
Istanbul Şişli Vocational School	2012	Istanbul Şişli Foundation
Ataşehir Adıgüzel Vocational School	2012	Adıgüzel Education, Culture, Research, Solidarity and Health Foundation
Istanbul Health and Social Sciences Vocational School	2010	Turkey Education Health Art and Fashion Foundation
Dreams Academy (Düşler Akademisi)	2008	Alternative Life Association (AYDER)

== Related lists ==
- List of high schools in Istanbul
- List of libraries in Istanbul
- List of universities in Turkey
- List of Private Universities
