= Istanbul Universities Union =

Student coalition in Istanbul, Turkey

- İstanbul Üniversiteler Birliği
- Abbreviation: İÜB
- Predecessor: Istanbul Universities Coordination (İstanbul Üniversiteler Koordinasyonu, İÜK)
- Formation: March 2025
- Type: Student coalition
- Headquarters: Istanbul, Turkey
- Region served: Istanbul, Turkey
- Members: Students from multiple public and foundation universities in Istanbul
- Website: www.instagram.com/istanbuluniversitelerbirligi

The Istanbul Universities Union (İÜB;, formerly the Istanbul Universities Coordination (İÜK; , is a student coalition formed in Istanbul, Turkey, in March 2025 during the nationwide 2025 Turkish protests following the detention of Istanbul mayor Ekrem İmamoğlu.

The coalition defines its principles as anti-imperialist, anti-fascist, and anti-capitalist, functioning as an inter-university coordination body. It has organized large-scale protests and boycotts, including the 25 March 2025 march from Maçka Park to Şişli Municipality, as well as participating in events such as the 1 May Taksim Square rally, the 10 May Boğaziçi University protests, and the 31 May Gezi Memorial.

== History ==
Following İmamoğlu’s detention in March 2025, student-led boycotts and demonstrations spread across Turkey, with university students playing a prominent role.

On 25 March 2025, İÜK convened a mass student assembly at Maçka Park, uniting participants from multiple campuses before marching to Şişli Municipality, where a government-appointed trustee (kayyım) had replaced the elected mayor. Local media reported tens of thousands in attendance.

In early April 2025, the coalition called for an "economic boycott" on 2 April, urging the public to halt purchases in protest against government repression.

Human Rights Watch later reported mass trials targeting students and journalists detained during the protests.

By mid-2025, the coalition began using the name Istanbul Universities Union (İÜB) in its public communications.

== Organization and membership ==
İÜB/İÜK describes itself as a coordination of campus-based activism. Media reports have noted the participation of students from both public and foundation universities in Istanbul, including:

- Boğaziçi University
- Yıldız Technical University
- Kadir Has University
- Yeditepe University
- Sabancı University
- İstanbul Bilgi University
- Özyeğin University
- Koç University
- Galatasaray University
- Gebze Technical University
- Turkish-German University
- Istanbul University
- Marmara University
- University of Health Sciences
- Bahçeşehir University

== Activities and positions ==
The coalition has issued demands including:

- An end to trustee appointments in municipalities and universities
- Release of detained protesters and students
- Restoration of elected rectorates
- Protection of academic freedom and student representation

Protest actions have taken place at several campuses, notably Boğaziçi University, Yıldız Technical University, Koç University, Sabancı University, İstanbul Bilgi University, Istanbul University, and Istanbul Technical University.

== See also ==
- 2025 Turkish protests
- Student activism
