= Melih Bulu =

Turkish academic and politician (born 1970)

- Born: 15 August 1970 (age 55); Kırıkkale, Turkey
- Education: Middle East Technical University; Boğaziçi University
- Occupations: Academician, politician and rector

Melih Bulu (born 15 August 1970) is a Turkish academic and politician. Having served as the Justice and Development Party's Sarıyer District President in 2002, Bulu was previously a candidate for nomination in the 2009 local election and the June 2015 general election.

Bulu was appointed as the rector of Boğaziçi University by a presidential decree on January 1, 2021. His appointment was controversial and subject to protests by hundreds of students, professors, and lecturers, as well as by NGOs. These protests occurred due to undemocratic nature of the appointment. The enactment that granted the President of Turkey the right to appoint university rectors was given during the now-abolished state of emergency, following the 2016 coup d'état attempt. The nature of Bulu's appointment caused him to become known as "Kayyum Rektör" (Trustee Rector). He was eventually removed from his position by a presidential decree on 15 July 2021. Prior to his appointment as the rector of Boğaziçi University, he served as the rector of İstinye University and Haliç University, and held various faculty positions at Istanbul Commerce University and Istanbul Şehir University.

== Personal life ==
Melih Bulu was born on 15 August 1970, in Kırıkkale. He lives with his wife Yasemin and his son Furkan in Beykoz, Istanbul.

== Career ==
=== Education and industrial career ===
Melih Bulu graduated from the Industrial Engineering Department of Middle East Technical University in 1992. He earned his master's degree in Banking from the Department of Business Administration of Boğaziçi University in 1993. He also received his doctorate degree from Boğaziçi University in Business Administration in 2003. Bulu's master thesis advisor was Dr. Deniz Gökçe and his Ph.D. thesis advisor was Dr. Güven Alpay. The electronic copy of his Ph.D. dissertation is not posted at the Thesis Center (Tez Merkezi) of the Council of Higher Education of Turkey (Yükseköğretim Kurulu Başkanlığı).

=== Professional career ===
After completing his undergraduate degree, Bulu worked as an engineer at two aerospace & defense companies: FMC-Nurol, which manufactures armored personnel carriers for the defense industry, and at TUSAŞ, the maker of ATAK military helicopters. While pursuing his graduate degrees, Bulu worked at various firms in the manufacturing and service industries including Procter & Gamble (P&G).

=== Political career ===
Melih Bulu started his political career in the social democrat party CHP (aka SHP at the time). He then was the youth lead for another liberal party during his college hears. Only later, Bulu founded the Justice and Development Party's Sarıyer branch in 2002. In 2009 he was a candidate of the mayoral election in Ataşehir, but was not nominated. In 2015, his internal party nomination as a candidate for the 1st electoral district in Istanbul failed.

=== Academic career ===
Bulu, who taught Business Strategy and Game Theory as a part-time faculty at Boğaziçi and Istanbul Commerce universities between 2003 and 2010, started to work as a full-time academic since 2009. He received the title of associate professor in 2008 and professor in 2016. Between 2010 and 2014, he worked as the Head of Istanbul Şehir University Department of Business Administration. He served as the founding rector of İstinye University in Istanbul between 2016 and 2019 and started to work as the rector of Haliç University in 2020.

He is one of the founders of the International Competitiveness Research Agency (URAK) in 2004. He first served as the agency's general coordinator and was later appointed to the presidency of the agency board between 2017 and 2019. In 2021, with the President's decision he was appointed as the rector of Boğaziçi University from a list of nine candidates proposed by YÖK.

== Controversies ==
=== Twitter controversies ===
Upon students reacting to the decision for cameras being mandatory in exams, Melih Bulu supposedly responded to his students' tweets with a fake account, accusing them of cheating on exams when he was rector of Haliç University. He then liked tweets sent by himself with his main account.

After the detention of four students in January 2021 Bulu tweeted at 1am a Tweet, which contained homophobic speech. He deleted the tweet some hours later.

=== Allegations of plagiarism ===
His work "Measuring competitiveness of cities: Turkish experience" written in 2011 is allegedly copied from "The environment and the entrepreneurial city: searching for the urban 'sustainability fix' in Manchester and Leeds". According to Cumhuriyet's report, the part he quoted in his article was an exact copy of the summary part of the other article. In the same report, he was accused of plagiarism for his doctorate thesis as, despite citing sources, he had not complied with APA rules regarding quoting. Bulu dismissed the plagiarism allegations as "slander". He talked about the allegations on Veyis Ateş's program that aired on Habertürk TV on 5 January 2021:

The whole plagiarism allegations are a slander. There are literature sections in the first parts of these theses. Everything there is a quote from somewhere. I have quotes in my thesis as well. At the end, the sources were cited. All the issue is about not putting quotation marks around some quoted parts, that's the matter. This is not something [important] after all; in our time, when I was writing these theses, we did not have any written instructions in front of us saying 'it should be done like this, it has to be done like that'. These formats are constantly changing. The bottom line is that I cited the source from which I got the quotes.

Similarly, an analysis on the Science Integrity Digest site included findings that Melih Bulu plagiarized his doctoral thesis. In the third part of Bulu's thesis written in 2003, between 30 and 50 percent of the information was found to be plagiarized.

=== Boğaziçi University protests ===
Boğaziçi University students stated that the rector should not be appointed but elected and criticized the action as a part of anti-democratic practices which allowed President Erdogan to unilaterally appoint university rectors following the 2016 coup d'état. Faculty members stated he was the first rector designated by forces outside a university in Turkey since the 1980 coup d'état. Bulu was protested by students who were outraged by the appointment which they deemed to be a political move by the ruling AKP. They said: "We do not accept it as it clearly violates academic freedom and scientific autonomy as well as the democratic values of our university", along with slogans "Melih Bulu is not our rector." Editor-in-chief of Yeni Akit, a pro-government newspaper, Ali Karahasanoğlu criticized the protests saying that: "As if a professor was not appointed in accordance with legislation and customs but a shopkeeper from Mahmutpaşa." After nearly a month of protest it became clear that no academic of the university wanted to work with Bulu as the vice-president. Bulu shut down the LGBT Club of the university (BÜLGBTI) in February 2021.

=== Controversial statements ===
In a 2019 TV interview about rising tensions in the Mediterranean, Bulu commented: "At present, there is no navy in the region that parallels the Turkish navy. Neither Israel, nor Egypt, nor Greece, the latter not even capable of floating ships, has a navy presence that compares to the Turkish navy. I think this fact needs to be put forward because when we get a seat at the table to have a piece of the pie, everyone needs to know that Turkey has a very strong navy. Perhaps we should present a few visuals of, say for example, one of our rockets hitting a ship in a small scale military intervention for everyone to see."

In another 2019 TV footage, Bulu answered a question regarding the consequences of Turkey's continued military operations near the town of Rojava in northeastern Syria as follows: "Well, Turkey is already quite experienced on this issue: we were involved in city wars before during the Euphrates Shield and Olive Branch operations and also in Diyarbakır and Nusaybin. We are trained in this area. Therefore, there would be a similar city war and we would capture the ones there probably dead or alive, so there is nothing new. Because the periphery of the city is already surrounded, they don’t have a chance of fleeing from there. Only the duration will be longer but we would have the benefit of testing our new weapons."

An earlier TV footage shows Melih Bulu stating: "Turkey has the ability to make nuclear weapons. We have close to 200 universities and hundreds of thousands of scientists. If the government gives the mandate for this technology, we would manufacture it without any problems. I think it would take 6 months."
