= Law no. 6284 =

Turkish statue

Law no. 6284 or officially Law on the Protection of the Family and Prevention of Violence Against Women was enacted on March 8, 2012, by the Turkish Parliament. Related to the Istanbul Convention, which Turkey had ratified in 2011, the law aims to provide protective and preventive measures against domestic violence, particularly targeting women. The law has been criticized for its statement that, "no evidence or documents are required to prove that violence has occurred in order to issue a protective decision." It has also been used to crackdown on government critics and activits, as in the case of Boğaziçi University Protests. Opposition parties New Welfare Party and Free Cause Party have called for the abolition of the law, citing its failure to prevent violence.
