= TJU =

TJU may refer to:

- Tianjin University, a national university in Tianjin, China
- Tongji University, a national university in Shanghai, China
- Turkish-Japanese Science and Technology University, a public university in Istanbul, Turkey
- Kulob Airport (IATA: TJU), an airport in Kulob, Khatlon, Tajikistan
