= 2021 Boğaziçi University protests =

Turkish university protests

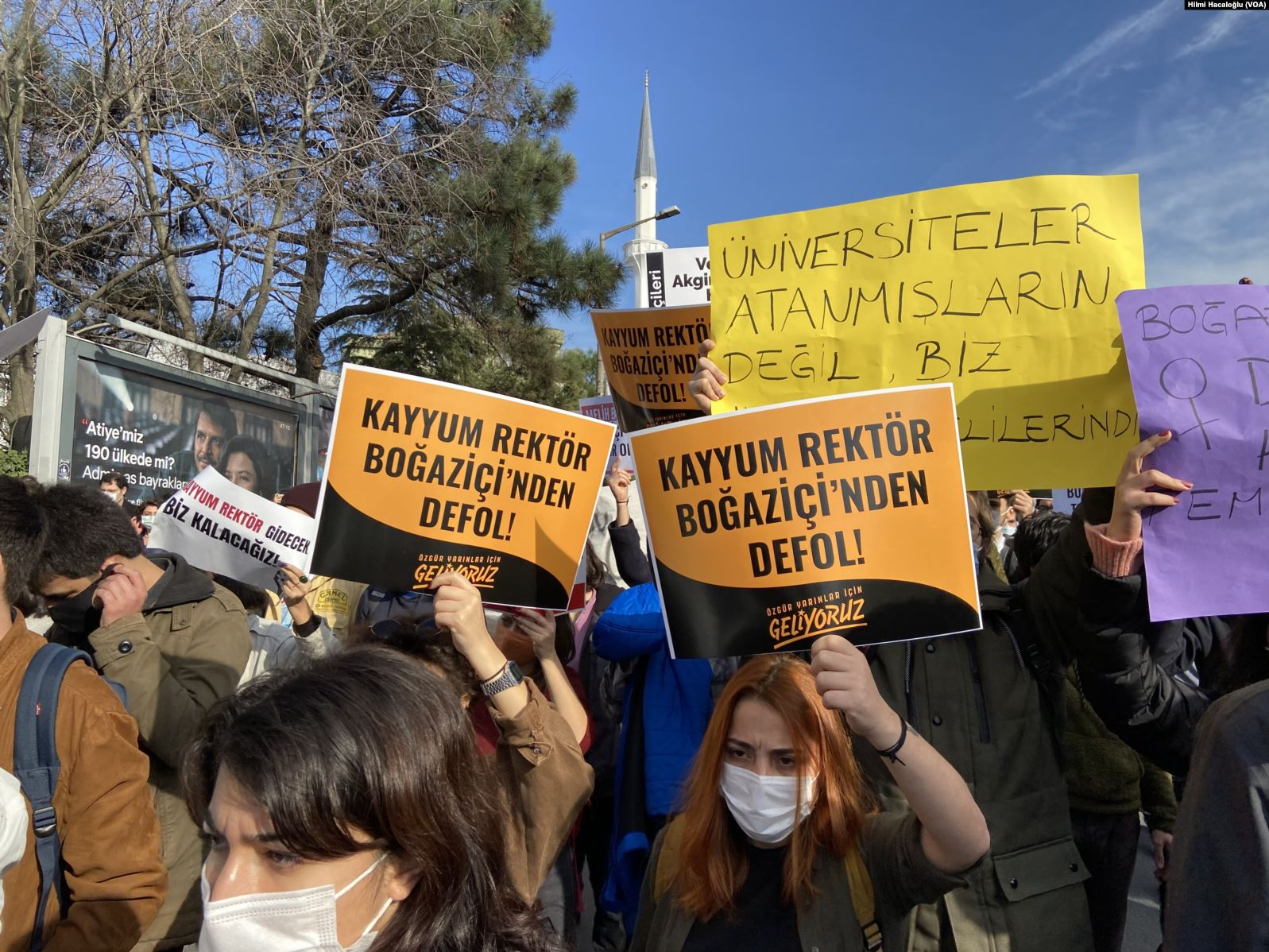
- Date: 4 January 2021 – present (5 years, 7 months, 1 week and 2 days)
- Location: Boğaziçi University, Istanbul, Turkey
- Caused by: Appointment of Melih Bulu as rector of Boğaziçi University
- Goals: Resignation of Melih Bulu; Election of rectors by the university; Preservation of academic freedom and scientific autonomy
- Methods: Demonstrations
- Result: Removal of Melih Bulu from his position by a decree from Erdoğan on 15 July 2021

Parties
Students; Boğaziçi University students; ITU students; YTU students; Ankara University students; Hacettepe University students; METU students; Galatasaray University students; Turkish-German University students; Koç University students; Academics; Boğaziçi University academics; METU academics; Istanbul Technical University academics; Galatasaray University academics; Istanbul University academics	Government of Turkey; Istanbul Police; Ministry of the Interior

Lead figures
No centralized leadership	Recep Tayyip Erdoğan (Turkey) Melih Bulu

Casualties
- Arrested: 9
- Detained: 560

Demonstrations have been held since 2021 against the appointment of Melih Bulu by President Recep Tayyip Erdoğan as rector of Boğaziçi University, one of the top academic institutions in Turkey.

== Background ==
On 2 January 2021, AKP founder and politician Melih Bulu was appointed as rector of the Boğaziçi University by presidential decree. According to faculty, this makes him the first rector to be chosen without involvement of the university since the 1980 coup d'état, when Ergün Toğrol, an academician of Istanbul Technical University, had also been appointed as rector.

== Protests ==
After the appointment hundreds of students began protesting on 4 January, chanting slogans such as "Melih Bulu is not our rector" and "we don't want a plagiarist rector". In a shared statement, faculty regarded the appointment as a violation of "academic freedom and scientific autonomy, as well as the democratic values" of the Boğaziçi.

Later that day, one of the university's buildings was sealed off by students who were able to enter the campus. Then, protesters clashed with the police as they tried to break a barricade in front of the entry to the university, ultimately resulting in security forces using pepper spray to disperse the demonstrators, with two students being detained during the course of the protests. By 6 January, a total of 36 students were in detention. Protests outside the rector's office continued into February at the hand of students and faculty, whose demonstration was later supported by various other Turkish universities and international associations of Boğaziçi alumni opposing the appointment.

An art exhibition was organized for the on-campus protest, during which four students involved in the exhibition were arrested because of a piece of artwork reportedly depicting the Kaaba alongside an LGBT flag and a figure of Shahmaran. In his Twitter account, Turkish Ministry of Interior Süleyman Soylu referred to the apprehended students as "four LGBT perverts", causing his tweet to be restricted later on. After the protests, Bulu ordered the Boğaziçi University LGBT Studies Club to be closed, a decision he claims had "no approach of targeting the LGBT identity", and which was made despite his assertion of being "a person who defends the rights and freedoms of LGBT individuals."

On 1 February, police blocked the gate of the South Campus to prevent further demonstrations, deploying to that end both a water cannon and barricades. Later that night, police stormed the campus and detained 159 students. 69 protestors were also detained in Ankara, with an unspecified number more arrested in İzmir. On 2 February, Turkish police arrested and detained another 104 protestors near a university in Kadıköy, and suppressed the demonstrators using tear gas and rubber bullets. The citizens of Istanbul responded by banging pots and pans in many parts of the city to show their solidarity towards the protest. On 3 February, 51 people were detained in Izmir when protests unleashed in front of the Alsancak Türkan Saylan Cultural Center.

On 12 March, 12 students carrying rainbow during a demonstration flags were arrested. Their release was demanded during a protest held by students on 26 March in front of the Justice Palace in Istanbul. During this demonstration another 50 students were detained. On 1 April, a demonstration took place in Kadıköy, where 35 students were detained and subsequently released that same night.

The protests at the university are still ongoing, and its development has been commented on by several renowned Turkish figures, including composer Fazıl Say and writer Orhan Pamuk, in a joint statement declaring that the interventions "will destroy the democratic values of Boğaziçi University, resulting in diminished academic excellence that will lead to perhaps irreversible public damage."

== Reactions ==
President Recep Tayyip Erdoğan said that "a routine appointment" was "being used to provoke the universities." He also referred to protestors as "terrorists" and denounced the LGBT youth. MHP chairman Devlet Bahçeli stated in a written statement that the rector was appointed by legal means and that the issue was closed to discussion. Bahçeli added that the protesters should not "strain their chances" and "not get caught up in anarchist projects", describing the protests as "a conspiracy that needs to be crushed." Erdoğan's Secretary of Interior Soylu stated that rector elections do not need to be democratic.

The mayor of Istanbul, Ekrem İmamoğlu, representing the center-left main opposition party CHP, supported the protests. Canan Kaftancıoğlu, the chairwoman of the CHP branch in Istanbul, also spoke in solidarity towards the manifestations, prompting president Erdoğan to call her "a terrorist of the Revolutionary People's Liberation Party/Front." This led Kaftancıoğlu to file a criminal complaint against the president.

After 23 days since the nomination of the new rector, no academic from the university had agreed to assist Bulu as vice-rector. As of 1 February, professor Gürkan Kumbaroğlu and professor Mehmet Naci had been appointed as two of his assistants. As of 24 March, professor Fazıl Önder Sönmez had been appointed as the last assistant to the rector.

As of 6 February 2021, 2 new faculties have been opened by the Turkish Presidency. Protestors have seen this move as establishing new staff solely to work with Bulu and give legitimacy to his position in the process. In March 2021, around 70 teachers of the university filed a lawsuit to depose Bulu from office. Meanwhile, Bulu appointed physicist Naci Inci, who also agreed on the vice-chancellor position, to be the leader of the social-scientific center of the university. After six months of protest, Bulu was removed by another presidential decree.

== Analysis ==
Baran Doğan of İleri Haber, a leftist website, states that, in order to overshadow the legitimacy of the protest, and since the government could not stop the protests through "oppression, violence and threats", they resorted to claim most of the demonstrators were not students but provocative terror groups.

== See also ==
- Anti-Erdoğanism
- Gezi Park protests
- 2025 Turkish protests
