= Canan Kaftancıoğlu =

Turkish politician

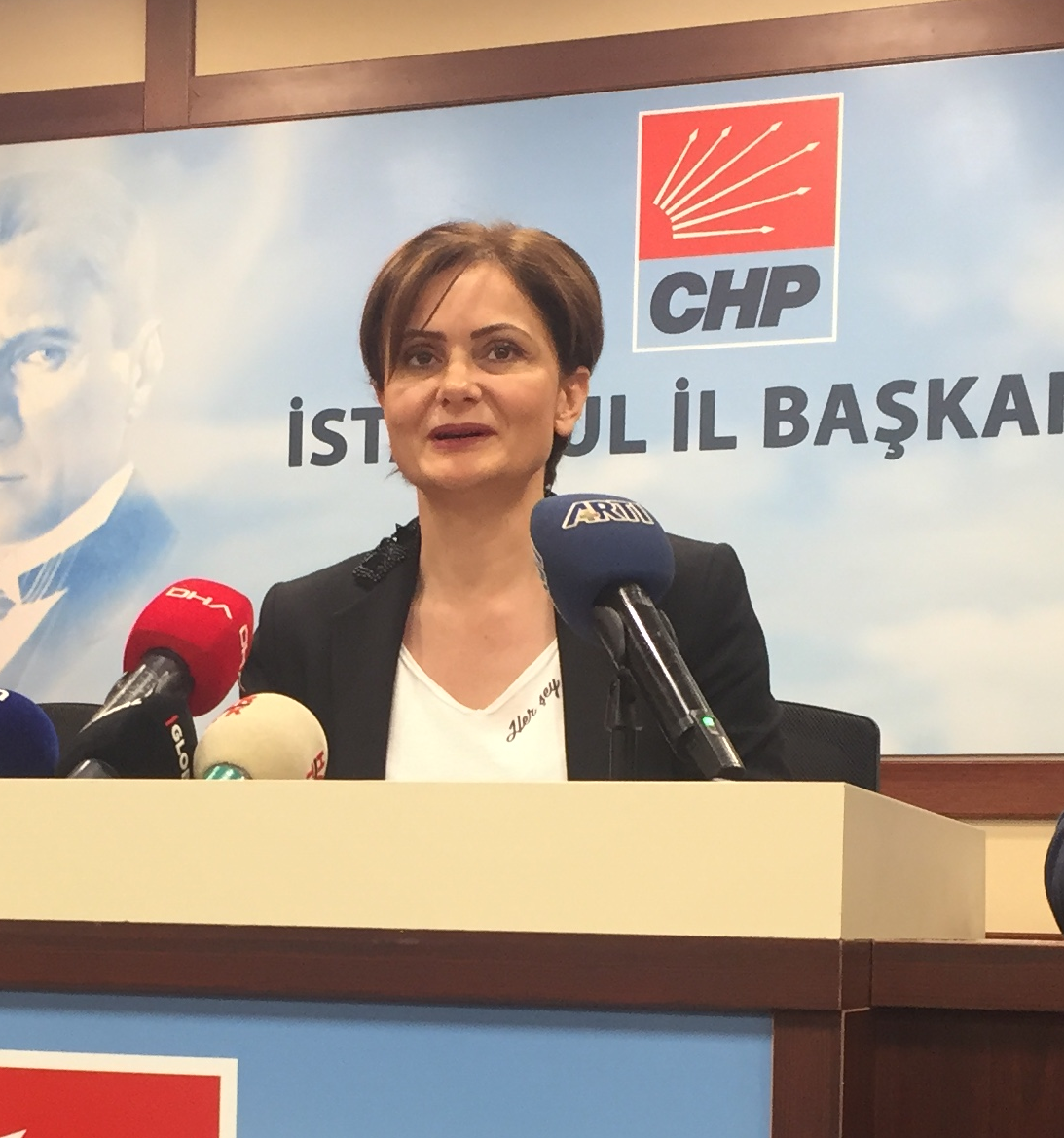
- Kaftancıoğlu in 2018

CHP Istanbul Provincial President
- In office 13 January 2018 – 14 June 2022
- Preceded by: Cemal Canpolat
- Succeeded by: Gülsüm Hale Özcömert Coşkun (acting); Özgür Çelik (officially)

CHP Istanbul Provincial Representative
- In office 2012–2014

CHP Istanbul Provincial Vice President
- In office 2011–2012

Personal details
- Born: 3 February 1972 (age 54)
- Party: CHP (2011-2022)
- Spouse: Ali Naki Kaftancıoğlu (2001-2024)
- Children: 1
- Education: Istanbul School of Medicine
- Occupation: Physician, Politician

Canan Kaftancıoğlu (born 3 February 1972) is a Turkish physician and politician. She was until 2023 the president of the Republican People's Party's (CHP) in Istanbul. In September 2019, she was sentenced to 9 years and 8 months imprisonment for insulting the president and terrorism related charges but after an appeal by the CHP, the Court of Cassation reduced her sentence to over 4 years and 11 months in May 2022. The Turkish government under President Tayyip Erdoğan's administration put her on trial for tweeting about the Armenian genocide and assassinations of the three female members of the Kurdistan Workers Party (PKK) in Paris. Her trial came in the wake of her party's victory in regional elections in Istanbul. During her trial she read out a poem by Nâzım Hikmet.

== Early life ==
Kaftancıoğlu was born in the village of Çiftlik Sarıca, Mesudiye, Ordu, the second child in her family. Her father was a primary school teacher and her mother was a housewife. After completing her primary, secondary, and high school education in Ordu, she graduated from Istanbul School of Medicine in 1995. She completed her residency with the thesis "Forensic Medical Evaluation of Torture Cases", which she developed by screening cases reported by the Human Rights Foundation of Turkey.

== Political career ==
Between 2011 and 2012, she served as the Vice President of the Republican People's Party (CHP) in Istanbul. She was responsible for press, culture, and communication affairs. She later worked as the party's Provincial Representative between 2012 and 2014. In the 2014 elections, she was one of the candidate's for Maltepe's mayorship. In the 36th Ordinary Provincial Congress of CHP Istanbul held on 13 January 2018, she was elected as the party's Istanbul Provincial President.

After Kaftancıoğlu became the CHP's Istanbul Provincial President, an investigation was opened about her various posts on social media. While the posts caused tension between her and Erdoğan, statements supporting Kaftancıoğlu came from the Peoples' Democratic Party as well as her own party. She eventually apologized to Erdoğan for her posts. A prison sentence of 9 years, 8 months and 20 days was ratified on 23 June 2020.

She was among the founders of the Social Memory Platform. She wrote a book. titled Benim Babam Bir Kahramandı, which was published in 2009. She is on the organizing committee of the Ümit Kaftancıoğlu Story Competition. She is a member of the United June Movement Steering Committee.

2020 she spoke in solidarity with the protest 2021 Boğaziçi University protests and was called by Erdoğan a terrorist of the Revolutionary People's Liberation Party/Front. This led to a criminal complaint against the president by Kaftancıoğlu.

=== Legal prosecution ===
After the CHP appealed the verdict over 10 years at the Court of Cassation, the court reduced the sentence to 4 years 11 months and 20 days in May 2022.

== Personal life ==
When she was working as an emergency doctor at the Suşehri Public Hospital, she met Dr. Ali Naki Kaftancıoğlu. They married in 2001. Kaftancıoğlu is the son of assassinated writer Ümit Kaftancıoğlu. The couple has a daughter named Çağım Işık.
