= Medical Park =

Hospital network in Turkey

- Company type: Private
- Industry: Health Care
- Founded: 1995; 31 years ago
- Headquarters: Istanbul, Turkey
- Number of employees: 6000
- Website: Official website

Medical Park Hospitals Group, which has been active in the health care sector since 1995, offers service in various provinces of Turkey with more than 6,000 doctors and employees, 17 hospitals in total. Medical Park is the biggest hospital group in Turkey.

The hospital chain was founded by Muharrem Usta, who currently chairs the company. The company owned two hospitals in Istanbul in 2005. In 2006, he initially sold 30% of the company shares to Sancak family. This partnership enabled a rapid growth of the company that led to the establishment of 13 hospitals with 2,000 beds within three years. By the end of 2009, 40% of the company shares were sold to the third biggest US-American global asset management firm The Carlyle Group. With this new partnership, the number of hospitals reached 17 with 2,771 beds in total that placed the company on first rank of its kind in Turkey. In March 2013, it was reported that the Carlyle Group sold its shares at Medical Park to the largest US-American private equity investment firm Texas Pacific Group.

== Sponsorship ==
The group sponsored the men's basketball team of Trabzonspor in the 2010–11 season of Turkish Basketball League. In the 2010–11 and 2011–12 seasons of Turkish Women's Basketball League, Galatasaray women's basketball team was sponsored. Medical Park also sponsored the women's volleyball team of Galatasaray in the 2010–11 season of Turkish Women's Volleyball League.

Medical Park is currently sponsoring Galatasaray men's basketball team since 2011, which became champion of the Turkish Basketball League in the 2012–13 season after 23 years again. In football, the group sponsors Antalyaspor, which plays in the Turkish Süper Lig.

== See also ==
- Joint Commission
- Bona Dea International Hospital
- İstinye University

== External links and references ==
- Official Website (in Turkish and English)
