= Rezan Has Museum =

Museum in Turkey

- Rezan Has Müzesi
- Location of Rezan Has Museum
- Established: May 2007
- Location: Cibali, Fatih, Istanbul, Turkey
- Coordinates: 41.02401°N 28.95969°E
- Type: Archeology, culture, art
- Website: www.rhm.org.tr

The Rezan Has Museum is a private museum in Istanbul, Turkey dedicated to culture and arts. It is a museum space that connects the past to the future with the 17th century Ottoman building remains and the 11th century Byzantine water cistern, enriching its collection by incorporating documents and objects belonging to the Cibali Tobacco Factory in 2009. Ahu Has daughter in law of the philanthropist Turkish businessman Kadir Has, founded the museum in May 2007. The museum is named after Rezan Has, wife of Kadir Has. Rezan Has Museum made its debut in the world of culture and art in May 2007 with the opening exhibition of the 11th International Eastern Carpet Conference, "Timeless Simplicity".

The museum, situated in a historical building, is located in Cibali neighborhood of Fatih district on the southern shore of the Golden Horn. It is open to public every day between 9–18 local time.

The museum has a very unusual archaeological collection, and provides space for exhibitions within the Kadir Has University's building, a European Union Prize for Cultural Heritage winning redevelopment from the historical "Cibali Tobacco Factory".

The museum consists of a cistern dating back to the 11th century, called "Karanlık çeşme" (literally: "The Dark Fountain"), which is one of the few Byzantian structures outside of the Walls of Constantinople along Golden Horn.

Seferikos Cistern and Ottoman Structure

Cisterns, which are underground masonry water tanks, were key structures in meeting Istanbul's water needs during the Byzantine period. The Byzantine period water cistern of our museum, dated to the end of the 11th century, has 48 arches, 15 columns, and 20 columns. The structure, which has a rectangular plan close to a square, was built to collect water directly. The cistern was built with reclaimed materials such as stone, terracotta leaf brick, and Khorasan mortar. Column capitals were created in various styles from the early Byzantine period to the 11th century. Cistern; After losing its purpose, it was converted into the tobacco warehouse of Cibali Cigarette Tobacco Factory. It was used as a food storage facility during World War II.

The remains of the building in the exhibition area date from the 17th century. The end use of the structure, which consists of two different blocks, which is thought to be a part, is unknown, but it is thought to be related to water.

== Exhibitions ==
The Rezan Has Museum hosts archeological, cultural and arts exhibitions for limited times.

Wide Belt With Hunting Scene

15 March 2022 – 31 May 2022
The Most Special Piece of Urartian Jewelry Art Comes to Light...

Archeology of Everyday Life

21 October 2020 – 31 May 2022
6,500 BC - 1,300 AD The “Archeology of Everyday Life” exhibition invites its visitors on a colorful historical journey from the Golden Horn Coast to Anatolia and the surrounding civilizations, starting on October 21.

Silent Witnesses From Neolithic Period to the Seljuks

March 23, 2009 – May 30, 2012
Archeological items found between the Golden Horn and Anatolia.

New Stories

September 15-November 20, 2011
Works of Mehmet Kutlu, a contemporary Turkish ceramic artists.

Like Moths to the Flame-The Ottoman Fire Brigades

February 24-August 31, 2011
Devices and instruments used by the Ottoman fire brigades and historical photographs.

Whispers of the Lost Languages

October 14, 2010 – January 30, 2011
Archeological cuneiform script examples showing early writing systems.

Do You Know Hasankeyf?

May 27-September 30, 2010
Photographs about Hasankeyf.

The Centennial Tale of Turkish Painting II

November 19, 2009 – April 30, 2010
