= Dreams Academy =

Turkish organization for special education

- Founder: Ercan Tutal
- Legal status: Active
- Purpose: Social inclusion
- Headquarters: Istanbul
- Location: Antalya, Kaş
- Region served: Turkey
- Parent organization: Alternative Life Association (AYDER)
- Website: http://www.duslerakademisi.org/en

Dreams Academy (Düşler Akademisi) is a Turkish alternative academy of arts, offering cultural and artistic education and recreation free of charge for disabled and socially disadvantaged people—in particular for those with a disability or a chronic disease. It is located in Istanbul.

Since 2008, Dreams Academy has been helping people with disabilities to get involved in social life. Dreams academy is offering many workshops in various fields like: dance, drama, sport, art, foreign languages, sign language and scuba diving.

The Dreams Academy project is realized with the support of Vodafone Turkey, Alternative Life Association (AYDER), United Nations Development Programme (UNDP) and Turkish Ministry of Development.

== Dreams Academy Kaş ==
In April 2014 Dreams Academy opened a second centre in Kaş. This location functions as a learning centre and alternative camp. During the season groups of socially excluded individuals are given the chance to a real summer-camp experience. They are given the opportunity to participate in activities such as: scuba diving, horse riding, sightseeing as well as several art and sport workshops.

== Social Inclusion Band ==
Social Inclusion Band is a sub-project of the Dreams Academy. The band is formed by musicians trained at Dreams Academy and volunteering professional musicians. The main purpose of the Social Inclusion Band is raising awareness around the issue of disability and self-improvement of the band members themselves

The band has performed at venues like Vodafone Freezone Music Festival, Efes Pilsen One Love Festival, İstanbul Jazz Festival, Rock'n Coke and shared the stage with musicians such as Moby and Limp Bizkit. Since its formation, the band has been performing at Babylon every month.

== Girls Without Barriers (Kızlar Atakta) ==
The "Girls without barriers" project is focussed on the empowerment of socially disadvantaged teenage girls (with and without disabilities). The main goal is to increase their self-esteem through engaging in diverse sports, outdoor activities and team building related trainings during the period of one week. The activities include camping, scuba diving, riding a bike, walking a 6 meter high rope course, trekking, horseriding, yoga, orienteering, swimming, dancing and diverse art classes
