= 2025–2026 Turkish protests =

Protests against arrests of political figures

- Part of the third wave of autocratization, democratic backsliding in Turkey, and the southeast Europe protests
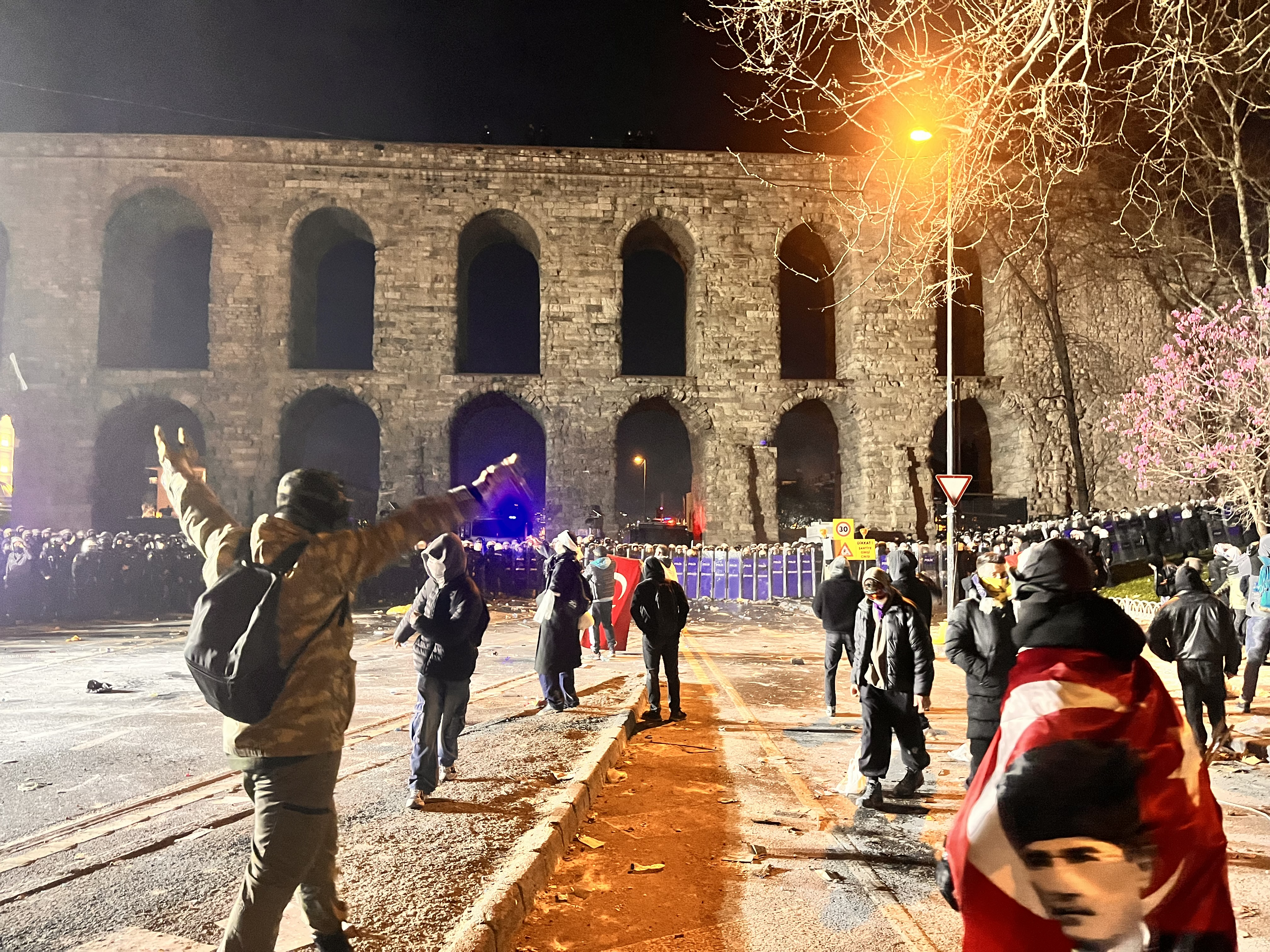
- Protestors in Saraçhane, Istanbul, 21 March 2025
- Date: 19 March 2025 – present (1 year, 233 days) Main: 19 March – 18 April 2025 (30 days)
- Location: Turkey; Northern Cyprus; Turkish diaspora, mainly in Western Europe

Casualties
- Injuries: 150 police officers (government claim)
- Arrested: Hundreds of protesters
- Detained: ~2,000 protesters

The 2025–2026 Turkish protests are an ongoing series of demonstrations across Turkey, Northern Cyprus and the Turkish diaspora that began on 19 March 2025 following the detention and arrest of Istanbul mayor Ekrem İmamoğlu and more than 100 other opposition members, officials businessmen and protesters by Turkish authorities. İmamoğlu, at that tine member of the opposition Republican People's Party (CHP) who had twice defeated allies of President Recep Tayyip Erdoğan in Istanbul mayoral elections, faced charges of corruption and alleged links to the Kurdish Workers' Party (PKK); Istanbul University separately revoked his degree, a move that could disqualify him from future presidential runs. Opposition figures characterized the arrests as politicly motivated attempt to remove Erdogan's leading rival ahead of the next presidential election, while the government maintained that the judiciary acted independently. the demonstrators, supported by the CHP and a range of other parties and civil society groups have been described as Turkey's largest since the 2013 Gezi Park protests.

Turkish authorities responded with mass detention, bans on public gatherings, curfew style travel restrictions into and out of Istanbul, and deployment of riot police, tear gas, and water cannons against demonstrators in multiple cities. Thousands of people have been detained since the protests began, and dozens of journalists, Turkish and foreign, have faced arrest, prosecution, and expulsion while covering the unrest, drawing condemnation from press freedom organizations. Social media platforms including X faced Turkish court orders to block hundreds of accounts linked to protest organizing, which X initially resisted before complying, prompting accusations of a double standard from free speech advocates.

The unrest coincided with a sharp economic shock; the Turkish lira fell to record lows against the US dollar in the days following İmamoğlu's arrest, the Istanbul Stock Exchange's benchmark index dropped sharply and the Turkish Central Bank sold tens of billions of dollars in reserves to stabilize the currency, prompting revised inflation forecast. The protests draw international attention, with Human rights organizations such as Amnesty International and foreign governments expressing concerns over democratic backsliding in Turkey, though the European Union and other Western partners have been reluctant to take concrete action given Turkey's strategic importance.

Despite his continued imprisonment, İmamoğlu was mentioned by CHP as its presidential candidate in March 2025. Large scale rallies, organized by CHP leaders Özgür Özel, have continued on regular weekly basis in Istanbul and rotating cities across Turkey into 2026, alongside continuing arrests, prosecutions of detained protestors and journalists, and sporadic unrest tied to related events such as May Day, Pride marches, and the anniversary of the Gezi Park protests.

== Background ==
=== İmamoğlu's political rise ===
Ekrem İmamoğlu, a member of the Republican People's Party (CHP), had served as Mayor of Istanbul since 2019. He won the mayoralty against candidates aligned with Turkish President Recep Tayyip Erdoğan allies in both the 2019 and 2024 municipal elections, the latter of which saw the CHP take control of most ofTurkey's major cities. These results were widely interpreted as the most serious institutional challenge yet to Erdogan's political dominance, and İmamoğlu had been considered the CHP's likely candidate for the 2028 Turkish presidential election even before his formal nomination.

=== Escalating legal pressure ===
In the months before his detention, İmamoğlu had intensified his public criticism of the Erdogan administration, prompting a series of legal actions against him, and figures in his administration. This pattern of prosecutions targeting opposition-held municipalities had already drawn comparison to earlier cases against other CHP and DEM Party mayors, feeding a broader narrative, advanced by opposition figures and international observers alike, of democratic backsliding under Erdoğan's government.

=== Economic backdrop ===
The detention took place against the backdrop of an ongoing Turkish economic crisis, with high inflation and a depreciating lira already straining public confidence in the government's economic management. This pre existing fragility shaped the scale of the market reaction once İmamoğlu was detained.

=== Comparison to the Gezi Park protests ===
Commentators and participants frequently linked the scale of the demonstrations to the Gezi Park protests of 2013, Turkey's largest wave of civil unrest in recent decades with some protestors tactics including banging pots and pans from balconies explicitly echoing that precedent.

== Protests ==
=== Initial protests (19–20 March 2025) ===
Within hours of İmamoğlu's detention on 19 March, demonstrators gathered near Istanbul police headquarters, chanting anti-government slogans and framing the arrest as a strike against democratic institutions. Tens of thousands gathered outside the Istanbul Metropolitan Municipality building, where CHP leader Özgür Özel urged supporters to continue backing İmamoğlu. The Istanbul Governor's Office responded by banning public gatherings and deploying riot police and water cannon around the police facility; clashes were reported, including police use of pepper spray near Istanbul University.

=== Demonstrations quickly spread beyond Istanbul. ===
In Ankara, CHP lawmakers protested outside party headquarters and briefly disrupted proceedings in the Grand National Assembly, while Middle East Technical University students marched before being blocked by police. Protests were also reported in Adana, Trabzon and İzmir the same day. Students and staff at thirteen universities held demonstrations or marches; police intervened with pepper spray at several campuses, including Mersin, Galatasaray, Dokuz Eylül, Ankara and Kocaeli, and at METU police used plastic bullets and tear gas against a student march. Demonstrations of support also took place among the Turkish diaspora, including in Dublin and in Berlin and Stuttgart.

=== Escalation and clashes (21–23 March 2025) ===
Protests intensified on 22 March, described by several outlets as the peak of the initial wave, with Istanbul's Saraçhane, Beşiktaş, Kadıköy and Şişli districts becoming focal points; heavy police presence kept protesters away from Taksim Square itself. Demonstrators carried banners and chanted slogans, and some banged pots and pans from balconies in a callback to the 2013 Gezi Park protests. Riot police, armoured vehicles and TOMA water cannon trucks were deployed; clashes broke out near the Aqueduct of Valens, and video circulated from İzmir showing police striking and detaining protesters. In Ankara, police blocked a CHP-led march toward parliament, while in İzmir thousands marched to Alsancak in defiance of a five-day demonstration ban.

Turkey's Interior Ministry said 343 people were detained overnight, and described some demonstrators' conduct as "provocative and violent"; opposition figures and rights groups countered that most of those detained were peaceful protesters. In Ankara's Güvenpark, 41 protesters were detained in what police called an anti-terror operation; seven of 22 detained students were strip-searched, drawing criticism. The Istanbul Governor's Office also restricted travel into and out of the province for anyone judged likely to join the demonstrations.

RTÜK chairman Ebubekir Şahin warned broadcasters they risked suspension if they continued airing footage seen as inciting street action; Sözcü TV and Halk TV cut live coverage of the rallies. Millions instead watched livestreams from İmamoğlu's own social media accounts and the CHP, reportedly peaking at four million simultaneous viewers.

=== Arrest of İmamoğlu and mass rallies (23 March – 6 April 2025) ===
İmamoğlu was formally arrested on 23 March pending trial on corruption charges; terrorism-related allegations were separately dropped. The same evening, the CHP confirmed İmamoğlu as its presidential candidate following its primary. Istanbul's municipal council elected CHP member Nuri Aslan as acting mayor, and Özel visited İmamoğlu in Marmara Prison.

A court ordered the pre-trial detention of seven journalists covering the protests, including AFP photographer Yasin Akgül, on charges of failing to disperse during a demonstration; Reporters Without Borders called the ruling "scandalous." BBC correspondent Mark Lowen was detained and then deported. Swedish journalist Joakim Medin was arrested on arrival in Turkey on 28 March and jailed pending trial on charges of insulting the president and alleged terrorist-organisation membership, tied to a 2023 protest in Stockholm; press freedom groups in Sweden condemned the arrest.

By late March nearly 1,900 people had been detained and 260 arrested since the protests began. On 29 March, a CHP-organised rally in Maltepe drew what Özel put at 2.2 million people, though press estimates were considerably lower, in the hundreds of thousands. A letter from İmamoğlu, read at the rally, said he had no fear because the nation was united against injustice. Özel announced plans for recurring Saturday rallies nationwide and Wednesday rallies in Istanbul.

A protester in a Pikachu costume, filmed fleeing police in Antalya, subsequently became a recurring symbol at the protests, appearing in later demonstrations in costume and on posters.

MHP leader and Erdoğan ally Devlet Bahçeli warned the protests risked provoking clashes with government loyalists and accused the CHP of using unrest to destabilise the government. Özel called for a nationwide shopping boycott of businesses perceived as close to the governing AK Party; prosecutors opened an investigation into the boycott call for alleged incitement, and eleven people, including actor Cem Yiğit Üzümoğlu, were detained for supporting it. On 6 April, Özel called for early elections by November at the latest.

=== Continued demonstrations and trials (April 2025) ===
On 11 April, İmamoğlu made his first court appearance since his arrest, not in the corruption case, but over separate allegations including remarks toward Istanbul's chief prosecutor and irregularities in campaign procurement and donations. The hearing was held inside Silivri prison rather than the usual Çağlayan Courthouse; the CHP accused the government of using the judiciary to block İmamoğlu from the 2028 presidential race, and two journalists who had reported on the case, Murat Ağırel and Timur Soykan, were arrested shortly before the hearing. Separately, 107 students detained earlier in the protests were released.

After teachers at several prominent Istanbul high schools were suspended for participating in or opposing the government's response to the protests, students at those schools staged their own demonstrations. Later in the month, the trial opened for nearly 200 people arrested during the protests, most of the 189 defendants were students, and eight were journalists. On 30 April, Joakim Medin was convicted of insulting the president and given a suspended 11-month sentence.

=== May Day, strikes, and the Gezi anniversary (May–June 2025) ===
The protests coincided with May Day; 407 people were detained during 1 May demonstrations. Student Esila Ayık, who had been held for more than a month despite medical reports questioning her fitness for detention, was released alongside two other students in mid-May. Joakim Medin was released and returned to Sweden following diplomatic lobbying.

In late May, around 23,000 workers at İzmir Metropolitan Municipality's İZELMAN, İZENERJİ and Egeşehir subsidiaries began a week-long strike over stalled wage negotiations, halting bus services, waste collection and other municipal operations across Turkey's third-largest city before the union accepted a revised pay offer on 4 June.

On 31 May–1 June, the Taksim Solidarity platform organised a commemoration marking the 12th anniversary of the 2013 Gezi Park protests. Police barricaded streets around Taksim Square and Gezi Park, preventing the planned march; the group instead read its statement on Mis Sokak, where representatives of political parties, trade unions and civil society organisations gathered.

=== Later developments (Summer 2025 – 2026) ===
Ahead of Istanbul's Pride March, the Taksim metro was closed by order of the Istanbul Governor's Office, and the Şişli district imposed a one-day protest ban; more than 50 people were detained during the march, which was held in Kadıköy instead.

A rally marking the 100th day of İmamoğlu's detention drew an estimated 100,000 people to Saraçhane; clashes broke out afterward between some protesters and riot police, with pepper spray used and one stabbing reported. Similar rallies took place in İzmir, Ankara and Gaziantep the same day. In October 2025, the Ankara 42nd Civil Court of First Instance rejected a lawsuit seeking to annul the CHP's 38th Ordinary and 21st Extraordinary Congresses. By February 2026, Özel said Wednesday rallies would continue across three Istanbul constituencies, with weekend rallies rotating to a different city each week.

== Government and official response ==
President Erdoğan repeatedly characterised the protests as illegitimate, at various points calling them a "movement of violence," "street terror," and a "show" intended to provoke unrest, while urging the CHP to stop what he called provocation. He also accused the opposition of deliberately harming the economy through the boycott campaign. Justice Minister Yılmaz Tunç rejected claims of political interference in İmamoğlu's case, saying the judiciary had acted independently. The Turkish government's communications directorate separately denied that a state trustee had been appointed to replace İmamoğlu at the Istanbul municipality.

=== Crackdown on press freedom ===
Beyond the journalists detained in the opening weeks (see above), press freedom organisations tracked a broader pattern of arrests, broadcast penalties and expulsions targeting reporters covering the protests, including Etkin News Agency's Elif Bayburt and Evrensel's Nisa Suda Demirel, both detained according to the Journalists' Union of Turkey. RTÜK imposed a ten-day broadcast suspension on Sözcü TV over its protest coverage.

=== Restrictions on social media ===
Turkish authorities moved quickly to restrict online organising and coverage of the protests. On 20 March, Interior Minister Yerlikaya said police had identified 261 "suspect account managers" accused of inciting hatred or hostility online, and detained 37 people in connection with the claims. Courts subsequently ordered X to block more than 700 accounts, including those of journalists, activists and opposition figures; X said it was objecting to the orders but complied with roughly 700 suspensions regardless, drawing criticism of Elon Musk for what commentators called a double standard given his stated free-speech positions. Wilson Center analyst Yusuf Can said most of the suspended accounts belonged to grassroots university-linked activists sharing protest logistics rather than major public figures. Meta also restricted protest-related content at the government's request.

== International reaction ==
Amnesty International's deputy regional director for Europe, Dinushika Dissanayake, described the government's actions as "draconian" and an escalating crackdown on peaceful dissent. European Commission president Ursula von der Leyen warned that Turkey's EU candidate status depended on upholding democratic values, and EU foreign policy chief Kaja Kallas and enlargement commissioner Marta Kos said Turkey was held to a higher standard given its candidate status and Council of Europe membership.

Despite this, EU officials acknowledged that Turkey's strategic role in migration, energy and defence made a substantive diplomatic or financial response unlikely; the country continued receiving EU accession-linked funds, including roughly €9 billion for hosting refugees, and remained eligible for further defence related funding. Analyst Dimitar Bechev said the EU would likely continue to accommodate Erdoğan so long as Turkey remained a cooperative strategic partner. Greece and Cyprus reportedly pushed for restrictions on Turkey's access to EU defence funds following the arrest. The Parliamentary Assembly of the Council of Europe approved a resolution calling for İmamoğlu's release, 90 votes to eight.

Within Turkey, some politicians from the pro Kurdish DEM Party expressed concern that the crisis could derail efforts toward ending the Kurdish Turkish conflict; DEM deputy leader Ebru Günay said events in Istanbul had underscored the country's need for genuine democracy. Reporting suggested DEM and many Kurdish voters were nonetheless cautious about fully aligning with the protest movement, partly due to separate, ongoing talks between the PKK and the government.

== Economic impact ==
Following İmamoğlu's arrest, the Turkish lira fell sharply by as much as 16.3% against the US dollar within three days by one measure, and to a record low near 42 lira per dollar by another. The Borsa Istanbul BIST 100 index fell 8.72%, and roughly $16 billion left Turkish markets amid the turmoil. The Central Bank sold an estimated $25 billion in reserves to stabilise the currency, contributing to higher interest rates and upward revisions to inflation forecasts. Economy Minister Mehmet Şimşek sought to reassure international investors that the turmoil would be managed.

== Cultural responses ==
The unrest led to the postponement or cancellation of some scheduled concerts in Istanbul. English rock band Muse postponed a scheduled Istanbul show to 2026 following pressure from anti-government protesters and controversial remarks by the concert's promoter; Norwegian singer Ane Brun also cancelled her Istanbul date. As noted above, a protester's Pikachu costume, filmed during a police chase in Antalya, became a recurring visual symbol of the protests in the months that followed.

== See also ==
- Politics in Turkey
- Human rights in Turkey
- Anti-Erdoğanism
- Gezi Park protests
- 2021 Boğaziçi University protests
- Next Turkish presidential election
- 2025 in Turkey
- List of arrested mayors in Turkey
- List of protests in the 21st century

2025 protests

- 2025 Serbian anti-corruption protests
- 2025 Georgian protests
- 2025 Romanian protests
- 2025 Indonesian student protests
- 2025 Balochistan protests
