= Istanbul Topkapı University =

Private university in İstanbul, Turkey

- İstanbul Topkapı Üniversitesi
- Established: April 21, 2009
- Chairman: Nihat Kırmızı

Formerly İstanbul Ayvansaray University logo

Istanbul Topkapı University or formerly Istanbul Ayvansaray Üniversitesi and Plato College of Higher Education was founded with the Cabinet Decision number 14944, dated April 21, 2009. It gained its legal entity status subsequent to the cabinet decision being published in the T.C. Resmi Gazete.

A view of Topkapi University's Bahçeşehir campus in Esenyurt.

== History ==
The foundation of Plato College of Higher Education took place in 2009 by Sinan Çetin, along with some academics, artists and business people. In the early days of Plato College, Sinan Çetin led the board of trustees. However, in the same year, the college moved to Balat, Istanbul and it was signed over to the Riva foundation. After it was assigned to the foundation, Tolga Yazıcı became the chairman of the board of trustees.
