= Kadir Has University =

Turkish private university in Istanbul

Coordinates: 41°01′30″N 28°57′32″E

- Kadir Has Üniversitesi
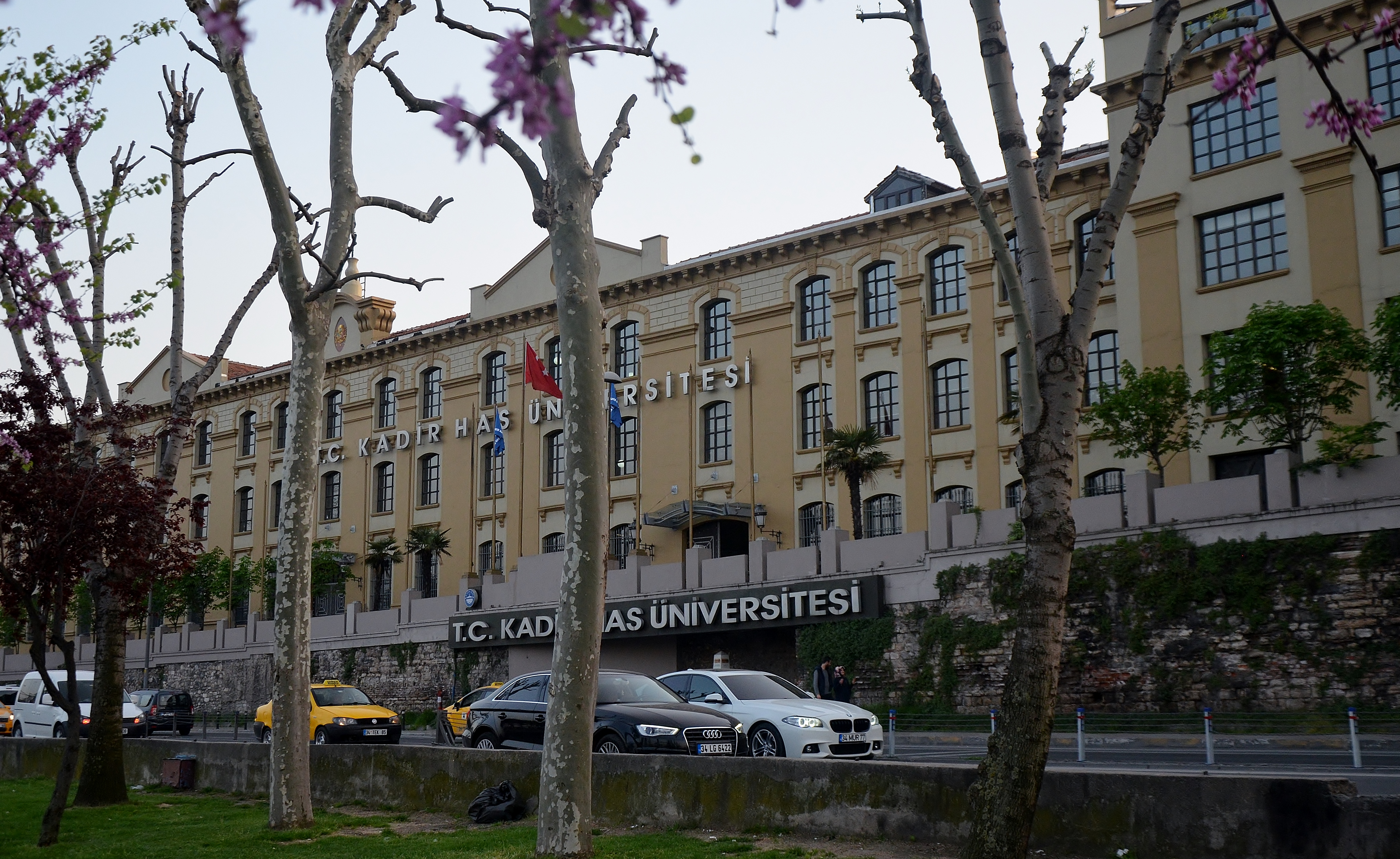
- Kadir Has University overlooks the Golden Horn, Istanbul.
- Type: Private
- Established: 1997; 29 years ago
- Affiliations: Kadir Has Foundation
- Rector: Prof. Dr. Ayşe Başar
- Faculty: 205
- Students: 5122
- Location: Istanbul, Turkey
- Campus: Urban
- Colors
- Website: khas.edu.tr/en

University rankings

Global – Overall
- THE World: 601-800 (2026)

Regional – Overall
- QS Emerging Europe and Central Asia: 301-350 (2022)

Kadir Has University (Turkish: Kadir Has Üniversitesi), often abbreviated as KHAS, is a private non-profit university in Fatih, Istanbul, established in 1997 by Kadir Has, the late Turkish industrialist and philanthropist.

Research centers at Kadir Has University include the Centre for Energy and Sustainable Development, Istanbul Studies Center, Sports Studies Research Center, Gender and Women’s Studies Centre, the Center for International and European Studies, and the Centre for Cybersecurity and Critical Infrastructure Protection. Additionally, Kadir Has University supports its students with financial aid and consultancy services through entities such as the Creative Industries Platform.

== History ==
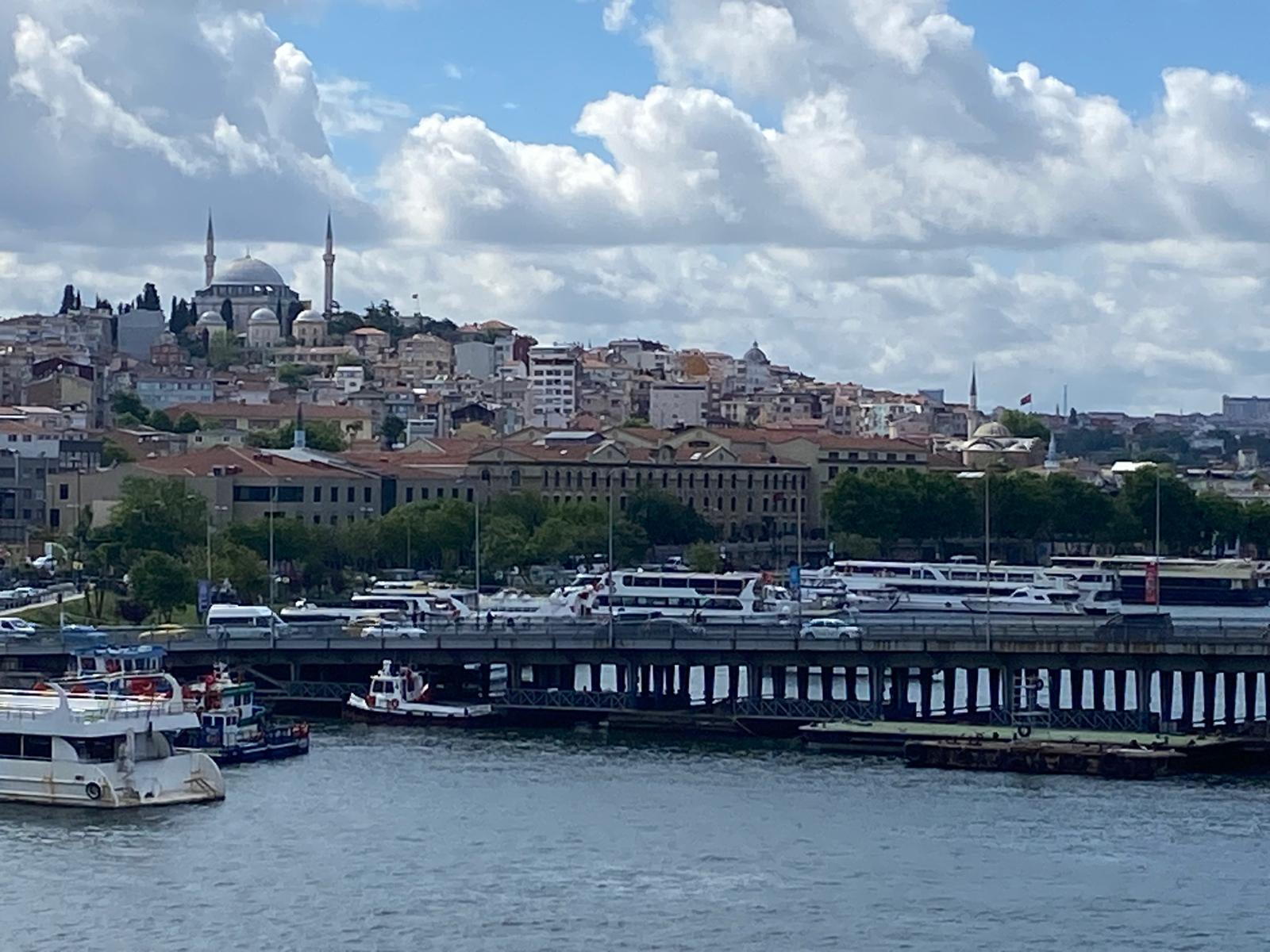
Kadir Has University from Golden Horn Metro Bridge

Kadir Has University was established by the Kadir Has Foundation, named after the late industrialist and philanthropist Kadir Has. The university is located by the Golden Horn in Cibali, Fatih, a historic district in Istanbul on the European side of the city. The campus occupies a building that was originally a tobacco factory, constructed in 1884 by the Ottoman Armenian architect Hovsep Aznavur. For nearly seventy years, the factory was operated by TEKEL, the state-owned tobacco company. Following a period of disrepair and eventual abandonment, the Kadir Has Foundation decided in the late 1990s to transform the dilapidated factory into a university campus, securing a twenty-nine-year lease from TEKEL in 1997. This building, restored by the university to preserve its original architectural integrity, is also a recipient of the Europa Nostra Award, recognizing its cultural heritage significance. Spanning over 45,000 square meters of indoor space, the campus houses classrooms, laboratories, the KHAS information center, all university faculties, institutes, the Rezan Has Museum, the rectorate, and deaneries.

After four years of extensive renovations, the university officially opened on 30 December 2002. Subsequently, the Cibali and Selimpaşa campuses operated simultaneously. In 2007, the Cibali Campus was renamed the Kadir Has Campus, and by the end of that year, a new modern D block was added to expand the facilities. In 2008, the Fatih Municipality and the university collaboratively built a gym and related facilities. Today, the campus includes over 35,000 square meters of indoor space plus additional grounds.

Additionally, the Cibali campus hosts the Rezan Has Museum, named after Kadir Has's wife. The museum is notable for housing an 11th-century cistern, one of the few remaining Byzantine structures outside the old city walls, and the ruins of an Ottoman-era bath.

== Core Program ==
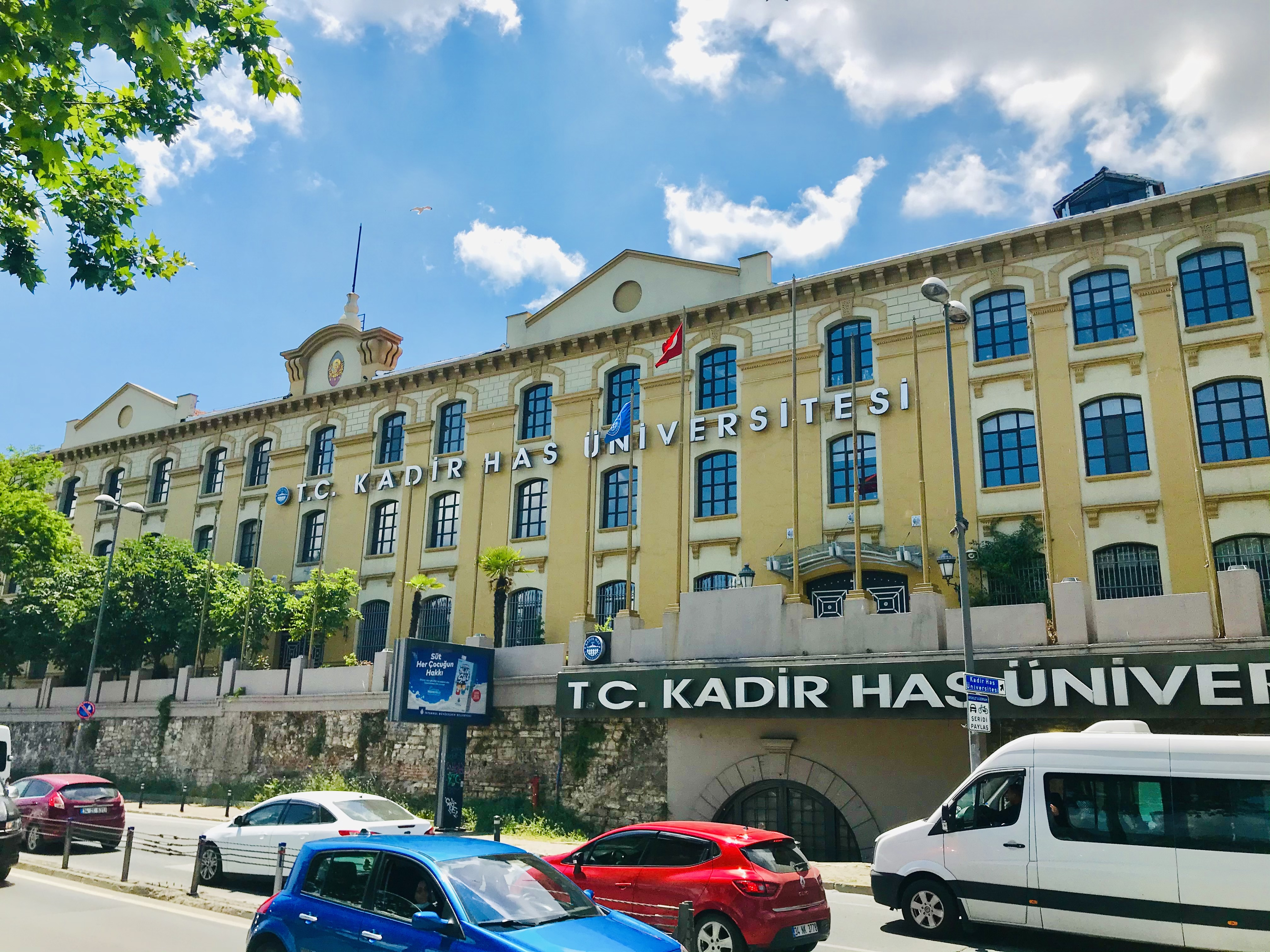
Kadir Has University campus is located along the Golden Horn in Istanbul.

As a research university, it is committed to producing high-quality research and cultivating students with top-tier competencies through a new education model that is application- and project-based. The university's Core Program seeks to revolutionize traditional education methods by equipping first-year students with creative and critical questioning skills necessary across all societal sectors. Since 2019, the university has also implemented the New Education Model, designed to prepare graduates for global employment opportunities.

It is an educational model that aims to enable students to have knowledge about other fields besides their own fields and to become enlightened individuals with the equipment required by the age. In this educational model covering the first grade, instead of the traditional exam system, assignments and projects are included so that students can be constantly active in the program. The core program, which has courses from almost every faculty and every field, aims to involve the student in the developments and situations in the world and to provide the student with the ability to comment in detail on it. The students' perspective on the events is tried to be enriched while the lessons are processed in a controversial way. In addition, during the seminars held under the name "Core Talks", academicians and experts in their field put certain issues on the agenda and inform students and all interested individuals about these issues.

== Faculties and departments ==
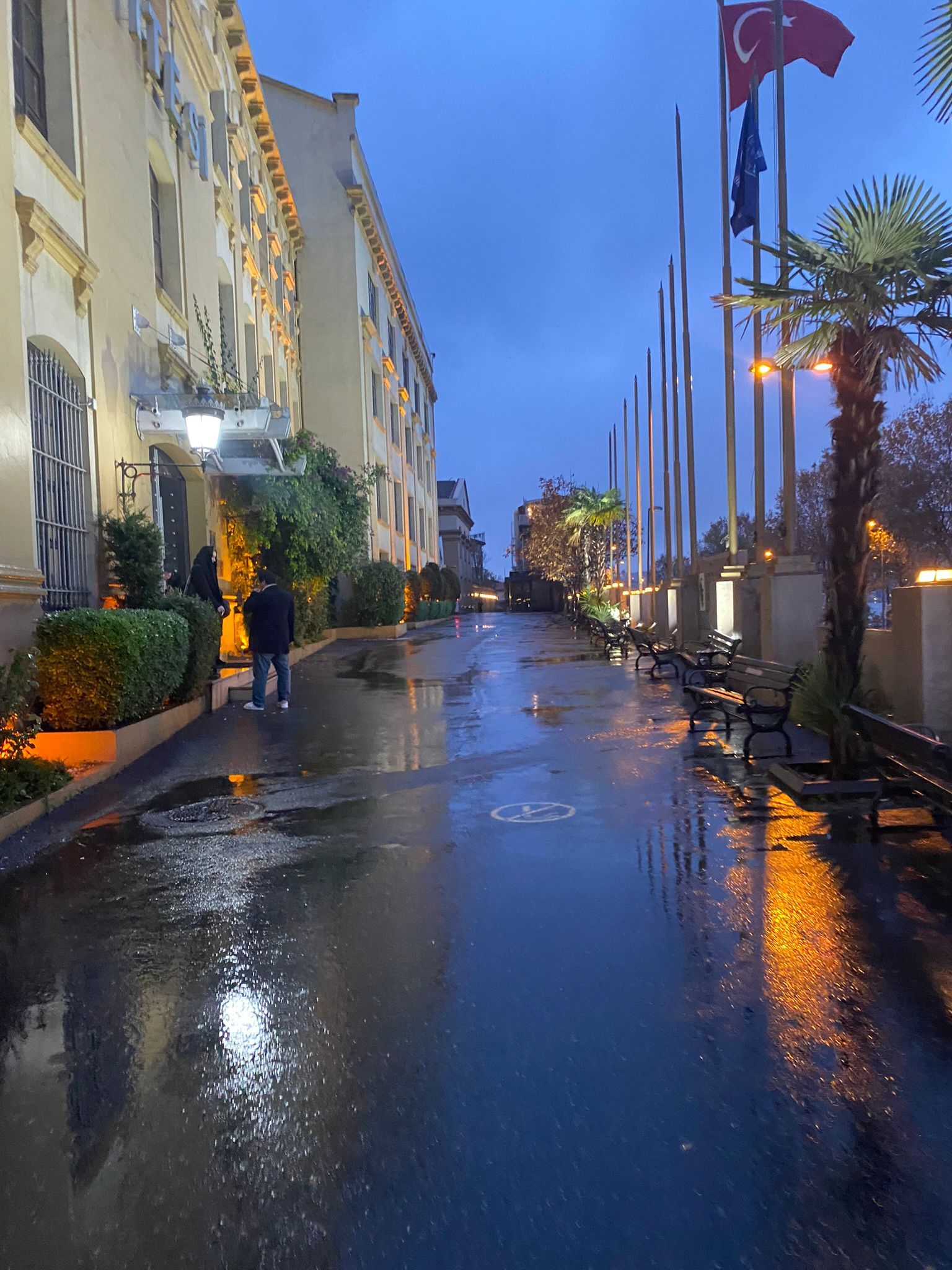
Kadir Has University main garden at night

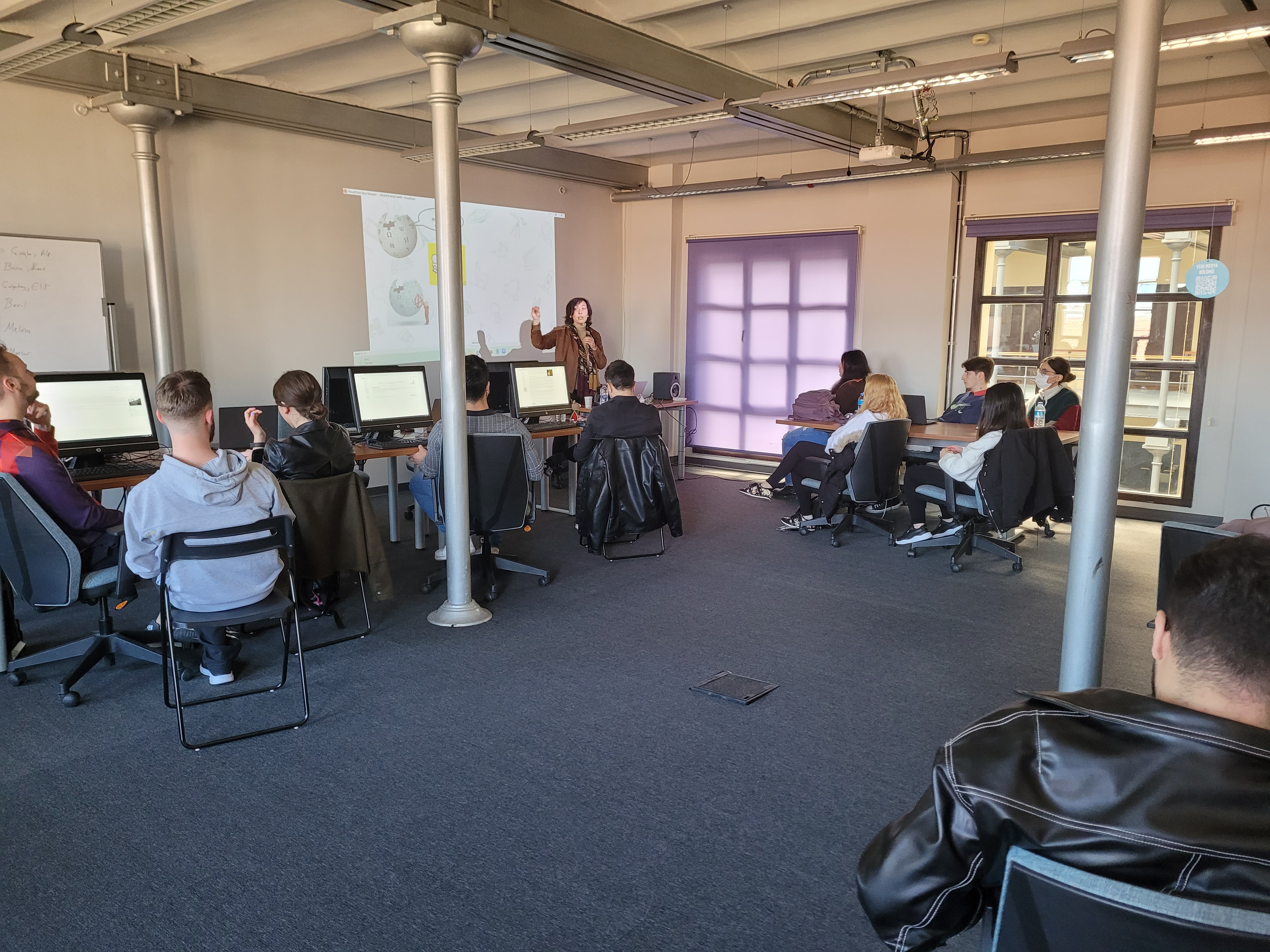
Kadir Has University New Media Department, 2022

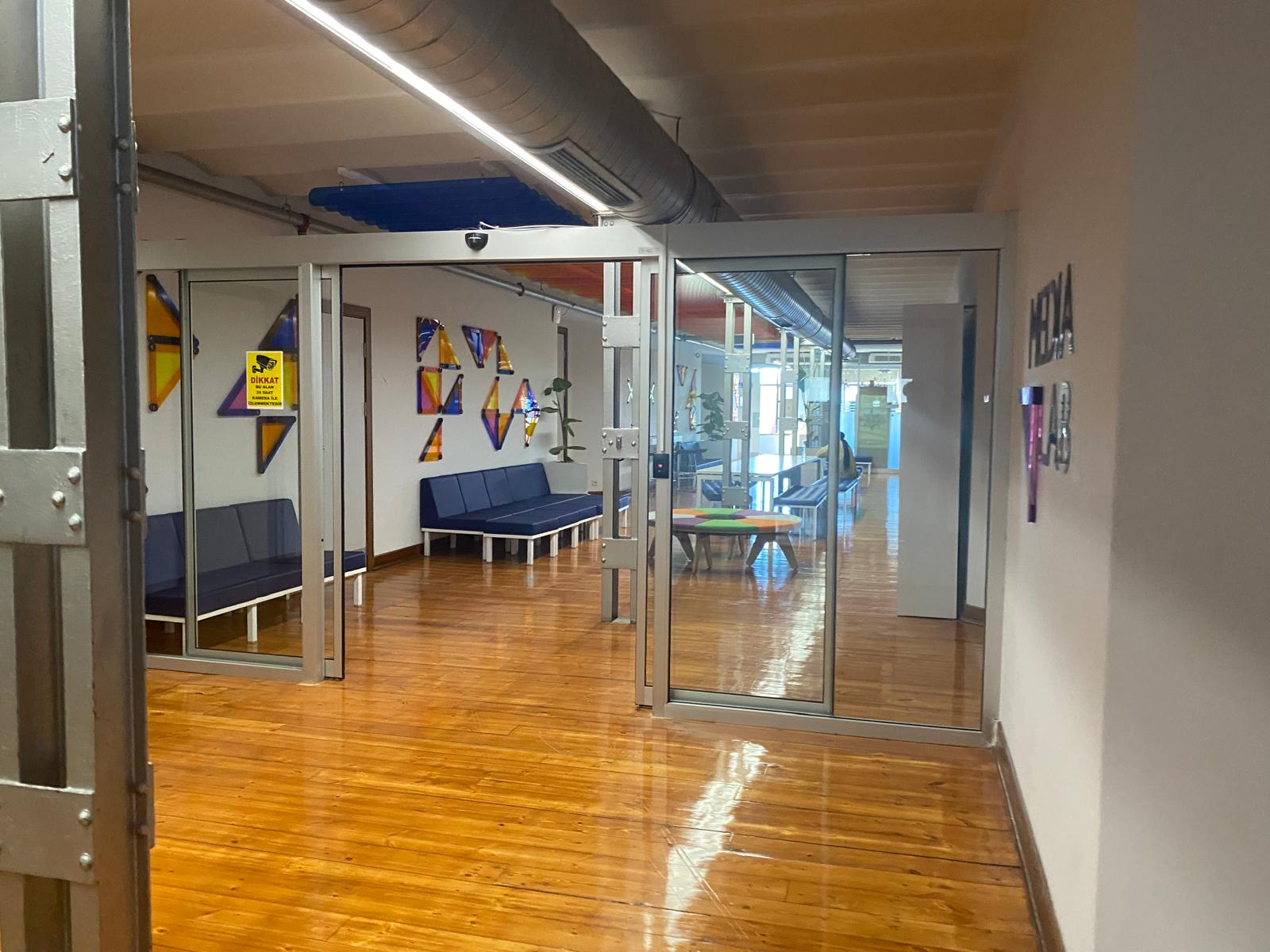
Kadir Has University Media Lab

Kadir Has University comprises five faculties: the Faculty of Art and Design; Faculty of Communication; Faculty of Economics, Administrative and Social Sciences; Faculty of Engineering and Natural Sciences; and Faculty of Law.

=== Faculty of Art and Design ===
Architecture, Industrial Design, Interior Architecture and Environmental Design, Theatre

=== Faculty of Communication ===
Advertising, New Media, Radio, Television and Cinema, Visual Communication Design

=== Faculty of Economics, Administrative and Social Sciences ===
Business, Economics, International Relations, Psychology, Political Science and Public Administration, International Trade and Finance, Management Information Systems,

=== Faculty of Engineering and Natural Sciences ===
Computer Engineering, Electrical-Electronics Engineering, Industrial Engineering, Mechatronics Engineering, Molecular Biology and Genetics

=== Faculty of Law ===
Law

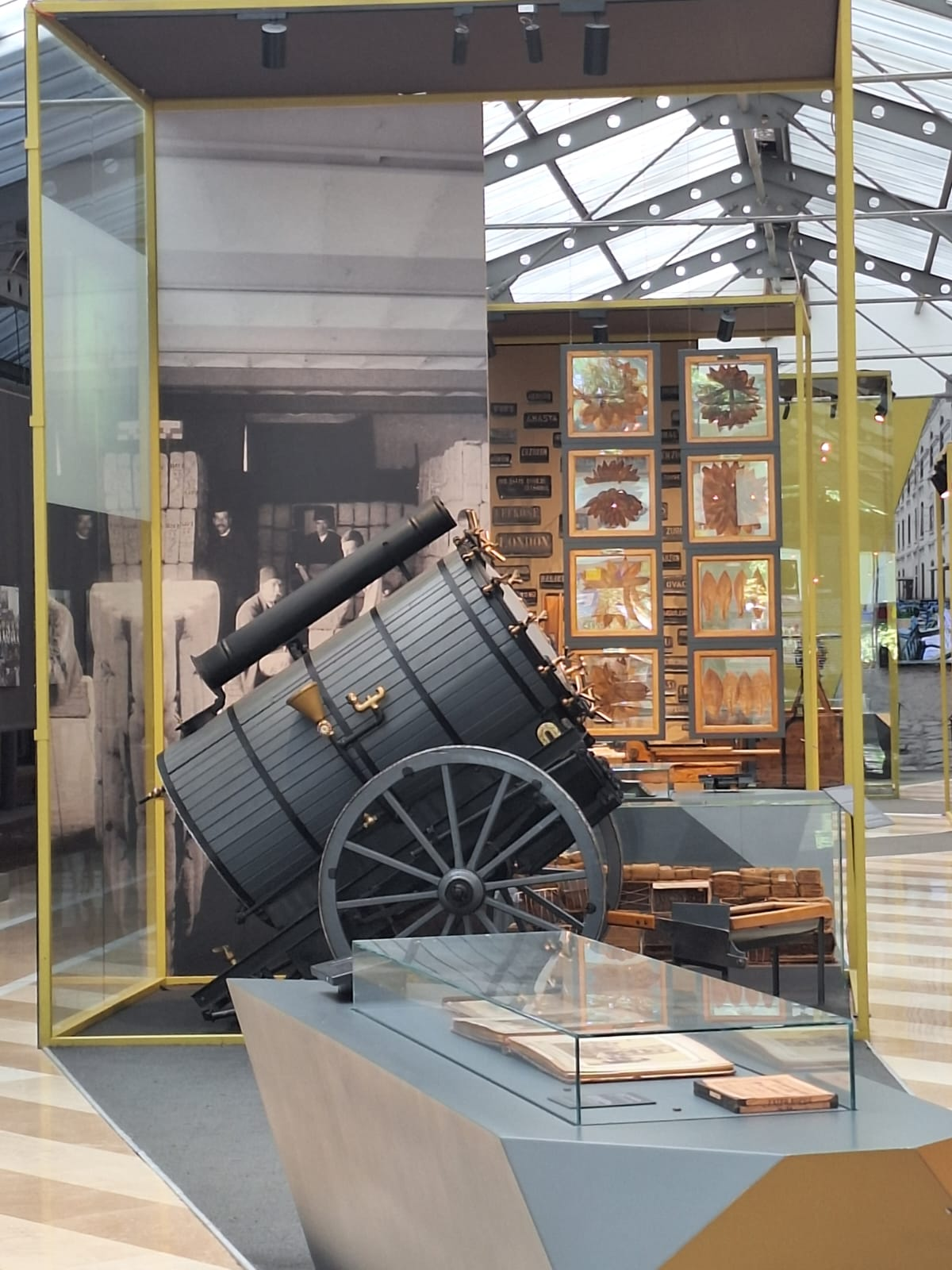
Rezan Has Museum

=== Sport Clubs ===
Kadir Has University actively promotes participation in sports as an essential aspect of student life, offering a robust platform for physical and skill development outside the traditional academic and cultural settings. The university facilitates various sports activities through expert coaching in different disciplines, including university team training, individual training, interuniversity competitions, on-campus sports events, international sports organizations, and traditional rowing competitions with Koç University.

Additionally, special programs are designed to enhance both the physical and mental development of athletes and students who lead a sedentary lifestyle. Kadir Has University is equipped with the necessary infrastructure and technical equipment to form teams, participate in sports organizations, host events, and engage in longstanding traditions like rowing competitions. Moreover, the university provides sports scholarships as a significant incentive, supporting students in their athletic pursuits based on their level of achievement.

== Rankings ==
The university was ranked among the top 601-800 in the World University Rankings of 2026, announced by the Times Higher Education. The university is ranked 6th in Turkey and 4th among foundation universities. According to the 2025 Turkish University Ranking by Academic Performance (URAP) Research Laboratory, Kadir Has University ranks 7th among foundation universities and 3rd among foundation universities without a medical school.

== Awards ==
In 2003, Kadir Has University was honored with the Europa Nostra Award for its exemplary restoration of a historical building. Following this achievement, the Kadir Has Foundation acquired and restored the C block of the same building, which now houses the Faculty of Art & Design and the Rezan Has Museum. KHAS alumna Ece Yüksel won the Best Actress Award at the 41st Istanbul Film Festival in 2022. The KHAS Gender and Women's Studies Research Center received third prize in the category of "Universities Contributing to Gender Equality" at the Turkey's Women Leaders Award 2021, co-hosted by Koç University and UNESCO.

In 2020, the Turkish Academy of Sciences Young Scientists Award Program was awarded to Dr. Deniz Eroğlu from the Department of Molecular Biology and Genetics, Dr. Emre Ozan Polat from Mechatronics Engineering, and Assoc. Dr. Onurcan Yılmaz from the Department of Psychology. In 2021, Doç. Dr. Onurcan Yılmaz and Dr. Ozan İşler received the Sakıp Sabancı International Paper Award 2021 for their article analyzing the cognitive and behavioral consequences of the COVID-19 threat globally and in Turkey. Dr. Gürbey Hiz was honored with The Most Successful Thesis Award from Istanbul Technical University in 2020. Prof. Dr. Sondan Durukanoğlu Feyiz, rector of the university, received the Honor Award from the Turkish Physical Association in 2019.

The Sign of The City Awards 2018 recognized the Cibali Campus, School of Foreign Languages building for "Best Cultural Heritage Conservation and Preservation. Prof. Dr. Bülent Mengüç was honored with the 2018 Best Reviewer Award from the Journal of the Academy of Marketing Science. The Best Short Documentary Award at the BUZZ CEE - Buzău International Film Festival in 2018 was awarded to the documentary Afghanistanbul. An IEEE-ICC2018 Best Article Award was presented for outstanding research contributions. Assoc. Prof. Birge Yıldırım Okta and Lecturer Gürkan Okta won the first prize in the Pandemics and Healthcare Professionals Memorial Space Design Competition.

== See also ==
- List of universities in Istanbul
- List of universities in Turkey
- Kadir Has Stadium
