= Haliç University =

Turkish private university located in İstanbul

Coordinates: 41.08585°N 28.95224°E

- Haliç Üniversitesi
- Type: Private
- Established: 1998
- Rector: Prof.Dr. Enes Eryarsoy
- Academic staff: 647
- Students: +16000
- Location: Istanbul, Turkey
- Campus: Mecidiyeköy • Şişhane • Şişli Bomonti • Fulya • Okmeydanı
- Language: English and Turkish
- Colors: Green and blue
- Nickname: Haliçliler
- Website: www.halic.edu.tr

Haliç University (Turkish: Haliç Üniversitesi) is a university in Turkey, which was founded in 1998 by the Children Leukemia Foundation.

Haliç University offers 21 academic departments, with three schools: the School of Nursing, the School of Physical Education and Sport, and the School of Health Sciences and Conservatory.

== Student life ==
The university hosts drama, music, visual arts and other cultural events each year.

At Haliç University there are more than 30 social, athletic, artistic, and other types of student clubs.

Medical Services

At Haliç University, a business doctor system and infirmary are present, in which two physicians and two nurses work alternately and which meets the sanitary needs of the students, academic and administrative staff in urgent cases. The daily medical examination of the students and academic-administrative staff is carried out in the infirmary and immediately required drugs are provided. In emergencies and more serious cases which necessitate further examination patients are sent to the hospitals. Due to a protocol with Vatan Hospital, the patients who consult the hospital through the university are given a 15% reduction of the total expenses.

== Undergraduate programs ==
- Faculty of Architecture
  - Department of Architecture
  - Department of Interior Architecture
  - Industrial Design
- Faculty of Arts and Sciences
  - Department of Molecular Biology and Genetics
  - Department of American Culture and Literature
  - Psychology
  - Translation and Interpretation
  - Department of Applied Mathematics
- Faculty of Engineering
  - Department of Biomedical Engineering (English)
  - Department of Computer Engineering (English)
  - Department of Electrical and Electronics Engineering (English)
  - Department of Industrial Engineering (English)
  - Department of Mechanical Engineering (English)
  - Department of Software Engineering (English)
- Faculty of Business Administration
  - Department of Business Administration (Turkish and English)
  - Department of Tourism Administration
  - Department of International Trade and Business Administration
  - Department of Public Relations and Publicity
  - Department of Business Information Systems
- Faculty of Fine Arts
  - Department of Graphic Design
  - Department of Textile and Fashion Design
  - Department of Photography and Video
  - Department of Plastic Arts
- School of Nursing
  - Department of Nursing
- School of Health Sciences
  - Physical Therapy and Rehabilitation
  - Nutrition and Dietetics
  - Midwifery
- School of Physical Education and Sport
  - Sports Management
  - Coaching Education
  - Recreation
- Conservatory
  - Department of Turkish Music
  - Theatre
- Faculty of Medicine
  - Medicine

== Graduate (master) programs ==
- Institute of Natural Sciences
  - Management Information Systems
  - Industrial Engineering
  - Electronics and Communication Engineering
  - Interior Architecture
  - Architecture
  - Molecular Biology and Genetics
  - Computer Engineering
  - Applied Mathematics
- Institute of Social Sciences
  - Traditional Turkish Music (graduate)
  - Traditional Turkish Music (proficiency in Art)
  - Psychology
  - Drama
  - Tourism Administration
  - Business Administration
  - Textile and Fashion Design
  - Graphic Design
- Institute of Health Sciences
  - Nursing

== Student activities - Student Clubs ==
Sports Clubs

Performance Sports

- Football/Soccer
- Basketball
- Handball

Nature Sports

- Mountaineering
- Law of salvage
- Orienteering
- Mountain Biking

Activities

- Skiing
- Scuba Diving
- Swimming
- Sailing
- Amateur sea training
- Tennis
- Horse riding

Fine Arts Clubs

- Acting
- Music
- Photography
- Documentary and Short movies
- Dancing

Tourism and Green Environment Clubs

- Unifriends
- Tourism, culture and arts

Psychology Club

Eastern Sports Clubs

- Aikido
- Kyudo
- Kendo
- Kick Box
- Tai Chi
- Yoga

Science and Technical Clubs

- Business
- Architecture
- Communication

Electronic communication Club

Computer Club

== Sport trophies between 2006-2009 ==
- Universities Cup - Category C Volleyball Group 1st place

March 23 - April 3, 2009 Place: Okan University, Women Team I.

- Universities Cup - Soccer Category A 1st place

April 18–22, 2006 Place: Bartın, Men Team II.

- Universities Cup - Soccer Category B 1st place in groups

March 27 - April 11, 2006 Place: İstanbul, Men team I.

- İstanbul Golf Club - İstanbul Cup, Men Category 2008 3rd place Melih Okyar
- 1st Place Men Eindhoven, The Netherlands

2–9 July 2006

- 2nd Avea - Kempinski Pro-Am Golf Tournament Winning Team Day I PGA Sultan Course
- 4th Theatre Festival between universities

May 22–26, 2006 Best Play- 2nd place

- 5th European Soccer Cup between universities 2nd cup
- 5th European Universities Football Championship Rome

July 9–15, 2007

- 6th Turkish universities sports tournament – Soccer, Category A 1st place

April 23–30, 2008 Place: Muğla, Marmaris Team I.

- 20 km Endurance horse riding competition – 1st place Yaman Gedikoglu

April 28, 2007

- Boğaziçi University Sports Fest 2006 Soccer Men 1st place
- Soccer – Category A, 1st place

May 5–9, 2007 Place: Marmara University, Team I.

- KOÇ FEST- Universities Festival

Final Men Basketball I. May 20–22, 2009 Place: İzmir

- KOÇ FEST- Basketball Tournament between Turkish Universities

April 7-May 1, 2009 Place: Ondokuz Mayıs University, Men Team I.

- KupaSU 2006 Sports Festival Champion
- Universities Soccer Tournament 2nd Division 1st place in groups - Team II

March 24-April 4, 2006 Place: Istanbul
