= İstinye University =

University in Istanbul, Turkey

- Type: Private
- Established: 2015; 11 years ago
- Parent institution: Medical Park
- President: Muharrem Usta
- Rector: Erkan İbiş
- Academic staff: 1.214
- Students: 15.142
- Location: Istanbul, Turkey
- Campus: Urban (Main campus in Topkapı, Vadi İstanbul and university hospital in Bahçeşehir, Başakşehir.)
- Language: Turkish, English
- Website: http://istinye.edu.tr

İstinye University is a private university in Istanbul, established in 2015 by the 21st Century Anatolian Foundation. It builds upon the MLP Care Group, which integrates the hospital brands “Liv Hospital,” “Medical Park,” and “VM Medical Park.”

The university operates two campuses, the Topkapı Campus and the Vadi Istanbul Campus, and utilizes İstinye University Hospital Medical Park Gaziosmanpaşa and İstinye University Hospital Liv Hospital Bahçeşehir as affiliated training hospitals. İSÜ Liv Hospital Bahçeşehir hosts multidisciplinary departments under one roof, including the organ transplantation center, stroke center, medical oncology, hand surgery, reconstructive surgery, IVF Center, interventional radiology and advanced interventional radiology. The hospital is also among the few facilities with both a pediatric intensive care unit and a closed-system intensive care unit.

== Istinye University Ranking ==
Istinye University's ranking in the Times Higher Education is placed in the 2001-1200 global band. The university also ranks among the top private universities in Turkey.

== Istinye University Tuition Fees ==
Istinye University fees vary depending on the program and language of study. Most undergraduate programs start around 4,300 dollars per year. Health programs are higher; medicine can reach about 29,000 dollars annually.

== Academic units ==
=== Faculties ===
- Faculty of Medicine
- Faculty of Dentistry
- Faculty of Pharmacy
- Faculty of Health Sciences
- Faculty of Fine Arts, Design and Architecture
- Faculty of Humanities and Social Sciences
- Faculty of Economics, Administrative and Social Sciences
- Faculty of Communication
- Faculty of Engineering and Natural Sciences

=== Institutes ===
- Institute of Graduate Education

=== Vocational schools ===
- Vocational School of Health Services
- Vocational School

== See also ==
- YÖK
