= Turkish-Japanese Science and Technology University =

Academic institution in Istanbul

- Türk-Japon Bilim ve Teknoloji Üniversitesi トルコ・日本科学技術大学
- Type: Public
- Established: June 18, 2017
- Rector: Mustafa Verşan Kök
- Students: 0
- Location: Çankaya, Ankara, Turkey; 40.9207°N 29.3196°E
- Language: Turkish, Japanese
- Website: tju.edu.tr/en

Turkish-Japanese Science and Technology University (Japanese: トルコ・日本科学技術大学; Turkish: Türk-Japon Bilim ve Teknoloji Üniversitesi) is a state university in Ankara, Turkey.

== History ==
The university, established by the decision published in the Official Gazette of the Republic of Turkey on October 3, 2016, is exempt from Higher Education Laws. It was founded on June 18, 2017.

On November 20, 2021, Bekir Sami Yılbaş was appointed as the founding rector of the university.
