= Turkish-German University =

Public university in İstanbul, Turkey

- Türk-Alman Üniversitesi
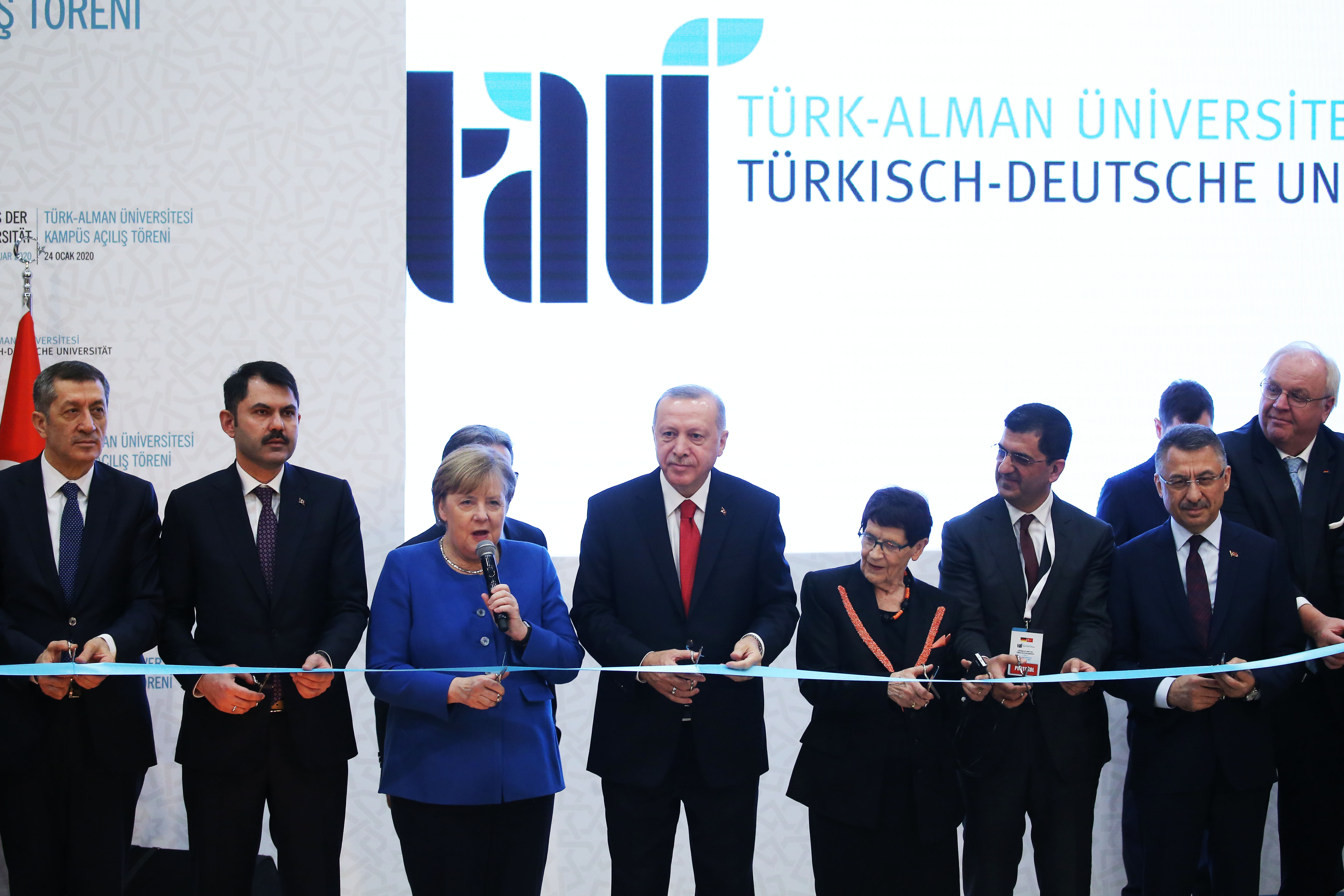
- Established: 2013
- Rector: Prof. Dr. Cemal Yıldız
- Location: Istanbul; 41.144467°N 29.100895°E
- Website: www.tau.edu.tr

Turkish-German University (Turkish: Türk-Alman Üniversitesi, German: Türkisch-Deutsche Universität) is a state university located in Istanbul, Turkey. The university was founded in 2013 with the intent of having an institute merging academic traditions from both Germany and Turkey. The university offers courses in Turkish, English and German.

== History ==
The costs for the university are shared by Germany and Turkey. Turkey is taking care of the costs of the buildings. From 2009 to 2020 around 28 Million Euro were invested from Germany by the Federal Ministry of Education and Research.

Turkish and German education programs have been developed by distinguished Turkish and German scientists. The Turkish-German University Consortium supported this process as a partner. Programs curriculum designed according to the needs of the Turkish and German business sector. The education system of all departments at the university is coordinated by their own partner universities in Germany. The most successful students can get the diplomas of both universities by getting 1 year of education in Germany. For example, all engineering departments except computer engineering are coordinated by Technische Universität Berlin. 37 German universities and German Academic Exchange Service (DAAD) are members of the consortium. The interstate treaty accepts the Consortium as a German partner of TGU, a state university. Both parties act together for the quality and success of joint research and education. Consortium Board of Directors, consisting of people from the fields of science, politics, culture and economy, supports TGU in its development.

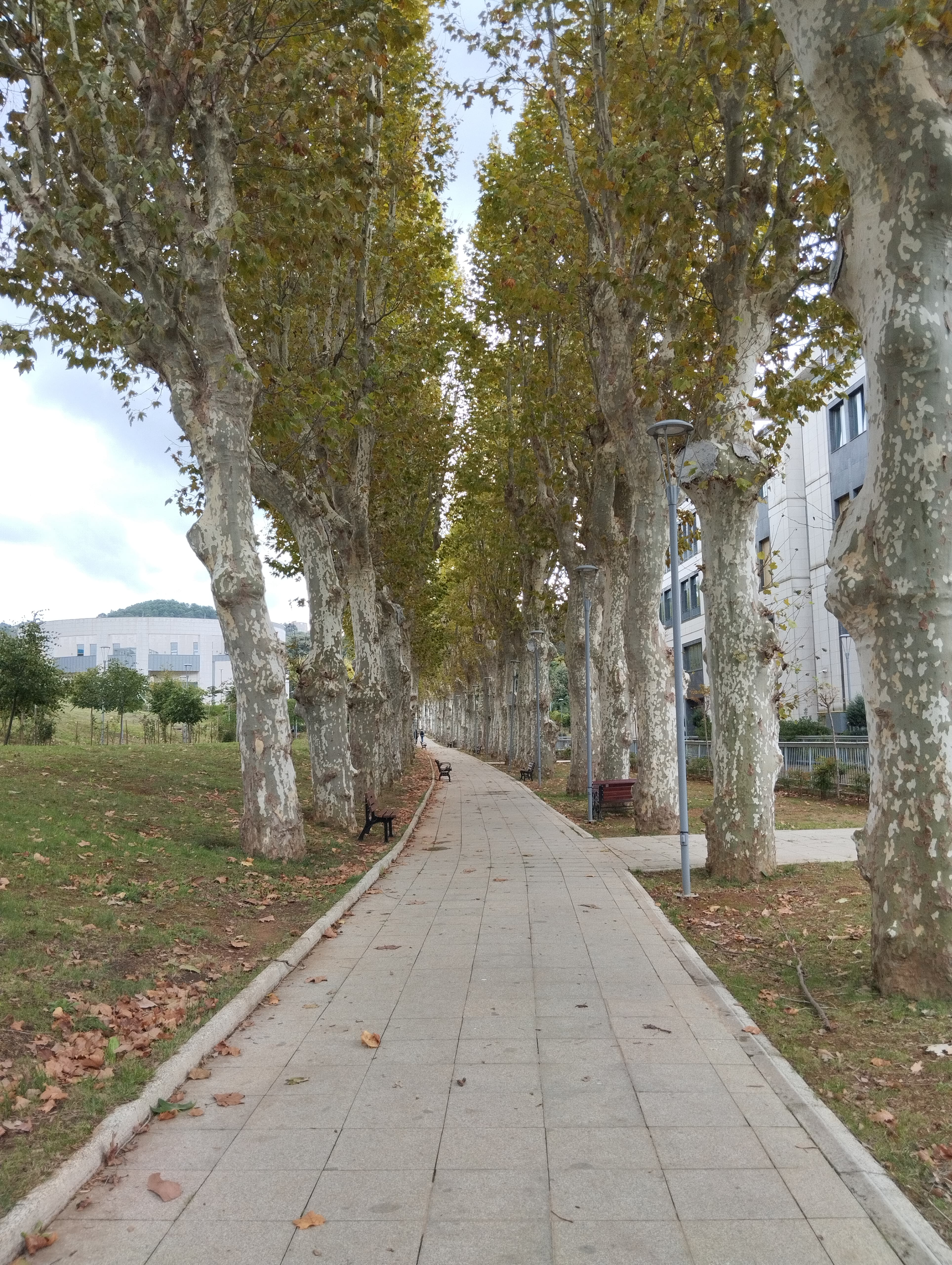
The Campus of Turkish German University

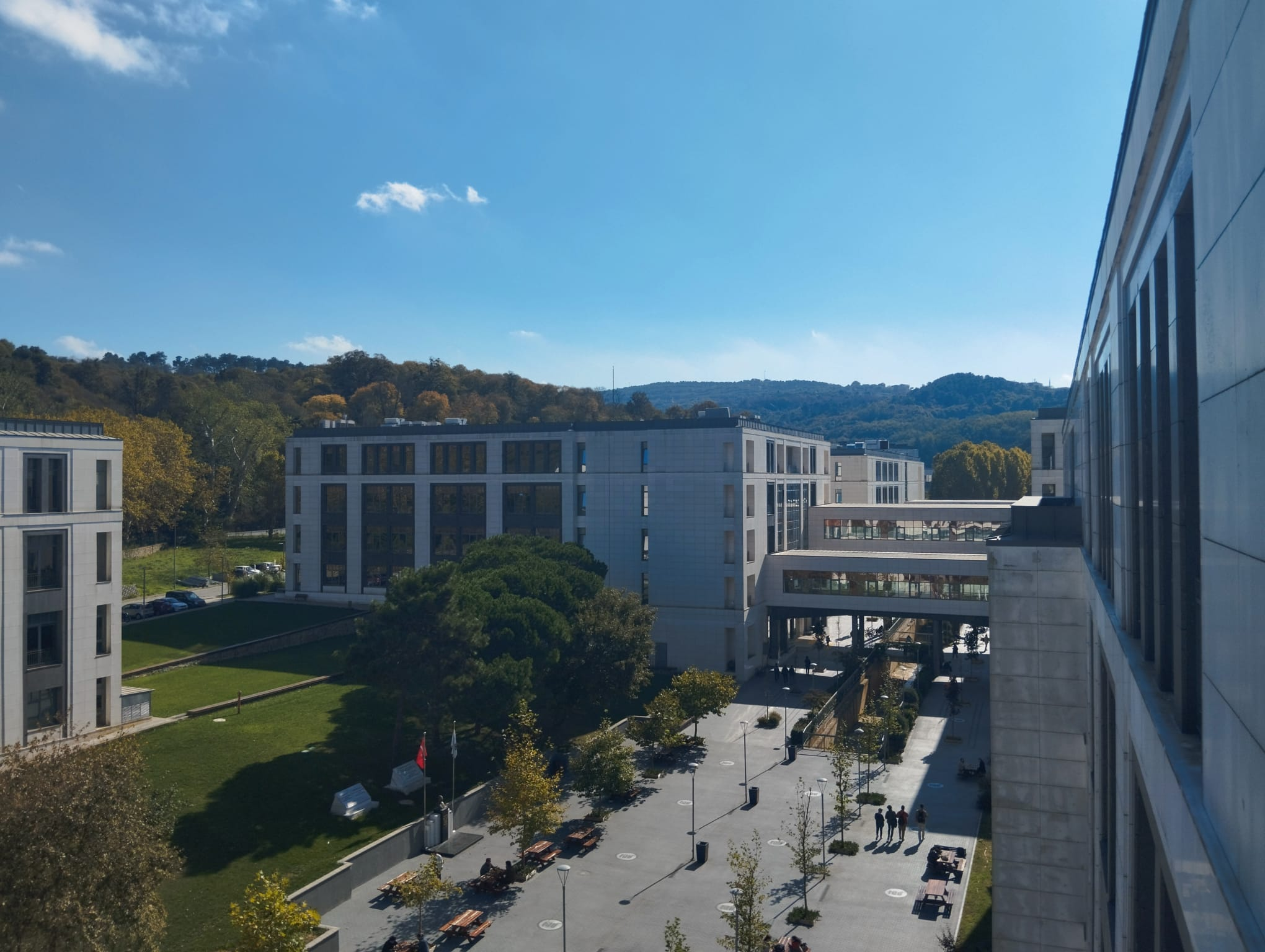
The Campus of Turkish German University

Consortium Members:

ASH Berlin BTU Cottbus FH Aachen FH Bielefeld Frankfurt University of Applied Sciences FU Berlin HBK Braunschweig HDWM Mannheim HS-Bonn-Rhein-Sieg HS-Bremen Martin-Luther-Universität Halle-Wittenberg Otto-von-Guericke-Universität Magdeburg Hochschule Bochum SRH Berlin TU Berlin TU Braunschweig TU Chemnitz TU Darmstadt TU Dortmund	TU Ilmenau Univ. Augsburg Univ. Bamberg Univ. Bayreuth Univ. Bielefeld Univ. Duisburg-Essen Univ. Erfurt Univ. Göttingen Univ. Heidelberg Univ. Hohenheim Univ. Konstanz Univ. Paderborn Univ. Passau Univ. Potsdam Univ. Siegen Stuttgart Üniversitesi Köln Üniversitesi WWU Münster DAAD

== Controversies ==
In 2016, six academics were dismissed, including two faulty deans. As a reaction to the critique stated by academics from Germany, the rector Halil Akkanat stated that academics from Germany only wanted to talk Turkey down.

In February 2021 it was revealed that the academic Taceddin Kutay, which has a contract with the university, had continuously published racist and homophobic tweets. Students of the university protested against it.

On 7 May 2021 the university social media accounts published a statement that the university has filed a lawsuit against its own member Murat Erdoğan considering him to have insulted the president. Students of the university protested against this decision.

In March 2022, the president of the consortium, Rita Süssmuth, the former president of the Turkish Higher Education Council (YÖK) and current advisor to Recep Tayyip Erdoğan, Yekta Sarac, and the former overall coordinator of the TDU, Izzet Furgac, received honorary doctorates from the university.

On May 26, 2022, students protested in front of the rector's building against the cancellation of the annual Spring Festival. Among other things, they accused the rectorate of not having given enough support to the student body at other events. In return, AKP events on the campus were quickly approved by the administration.
