= List of revolving restaurants =

The following is a list of revolving restaurants. A revolving restaurant is usually a tower restaurant designed to rest atop a broad circular revolving platform that operates as a large turntable. The building remains stationary and the diners are carried on the revolving floor.

== Albania ==
- Sky Club Panoramic Bar & Restaurant, Sky Tower, Tirana
- Dajti Tower Belvedere Hotel, Dajti, Tirana
- Bar Zodiak, Shkodër

== Argentina ==
- Confiteria Giratoria, San Carlos de Bariloche

== Australia ==
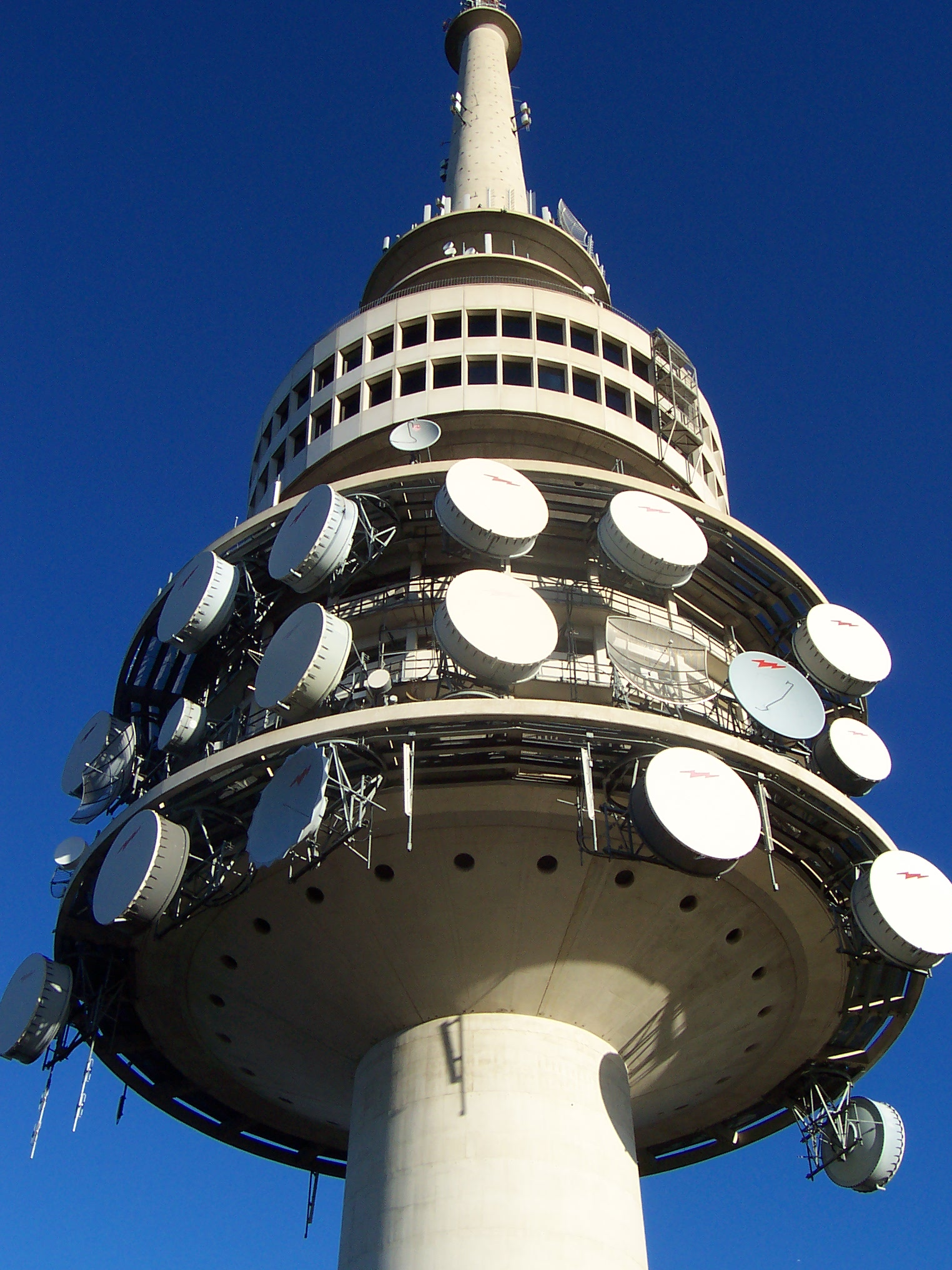
Restaurant and observation decks at Black Mountain Tower, Canberra

=== New South Wales ===
- 360 Bar and Dining, Sydney Tower, Sydney
- Cucina Locale Revolving Restaurant, Blacktown
- Skyway Restaurant, Katoomba Scenic World, Katoomba (ceased revolving in 2012, however can be rotated during private events on request)
- O Bar Restaurant, Australia Square, Sydney

=== Queensland ===
- Horizon Sky Dining (previously Four Winds Revolving Restaurant), Crowne Plaza, Surfers Paradise

=== Tasmania ===
- Point Revolving Restaurant, Wrest Point Hotel Casino, Sandy Bay

=== Western Australia ===
- C Restaurant, St Martins Tower, Perth
- Koala's View Revolving Restaurant, Bedfordale (defunct)

== Austria ==
- Donauturm, Vienna

== Azerbaijan ==
- Hilton Hotel, Baku

== Bangladesh ==
- Top of the World Restaurant, Shaheed Zia Smriti Complex, Chandgaon Thana, Chittagong
- Mainland China, Siam Tower, Uttara Model Town, Dhaka

== Bolivia ==
- Restaurante Giratorio Pari Urqu, Potosí

== Bosnia and Herzegovina ==
- Radon Plaza, Sarajevo

== Brazil ==
- Revolving Mascaron Restaurant, Torre Mirante da Serra, Veranópolis
- Revolving Rooftop Restaurant, Taj Mahal Continental Hotel, Manaus
- Lassú, K1 Building São Paulo

== Bulgaria ==
- Magnito Sky, Varna Towers, Varna

== Cambodia ==
- The Penthouse Residence, Cheval Blanc Restaurant, Celeste Sky Bar Phnom Penh

== Canada ==
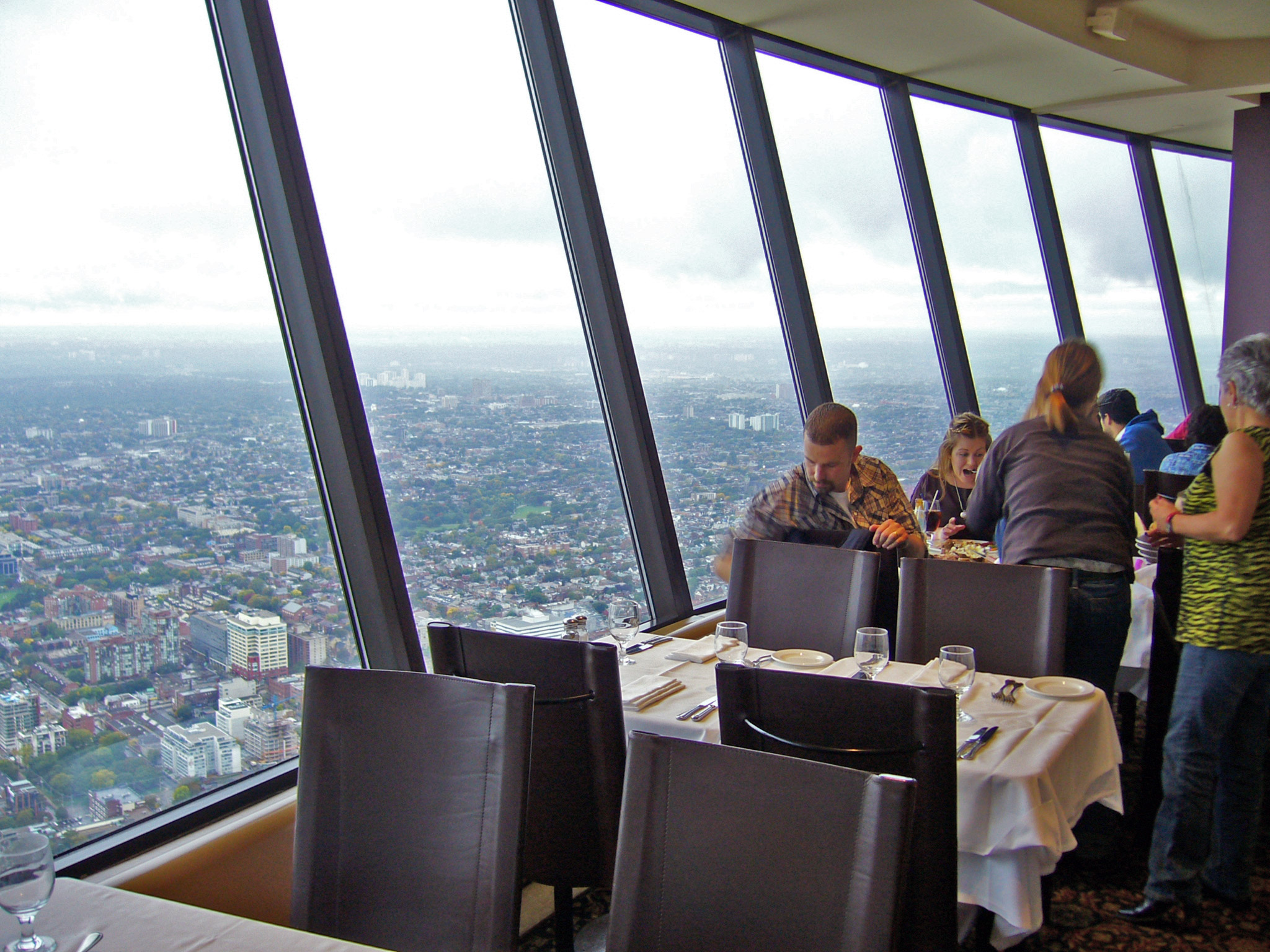
Inside the 360 Restaurant at the CN Tower, Toronto

=== Alberta ===
- La Ronde, Chateau Lacombe Hotel, Edmonton
- Sky 360 Restaurant, Calgary Tower, Calgary

=== British Columbia ===
View of the Top of Vancouver Revolving Restaurant, Harbour Centre, Vancouver

- Top of Vancouver Revolving Restaurant, Harbour Centre, Vancouver
- Vistas Revolving Restaurant & Bar, Pinnacle Hotel Harbourfront, Vancouver (closed, now private convention space)

=== Manitoba ===
- Prairie 360, Fort Garry Place, Winnipeg Closed 2020

=== Ontario ===
- 360 Restaurant (Top of Toronto 1975–1995), CN Tower, Toronto
- Skylon Tower, Niagara Falls
- Summit, Ottawa Marriott Hotel, Ottawa (restaurant closed, currently a revolving event room)
- Toulà (formerly Lighthouse), Westin Harbour Castle Hotel, Toronto (ceased revolving in 2001)
- La Ronde, Holiday Inn Downtown 89 Chesnut (now Chestnut Residence and restaurant on southwest corner closed now used as non-revolving student lounge The Lookout)

=== Quebec ===
- Ciel! Bistro-Bar, Hotel le Concorde, Quebec City
- Portus 360, Plaza Centre-Ville, Montreal

== Chile ==
- Coco-Loco, Valparaíso
- Giratorio, Santiago

== China ==
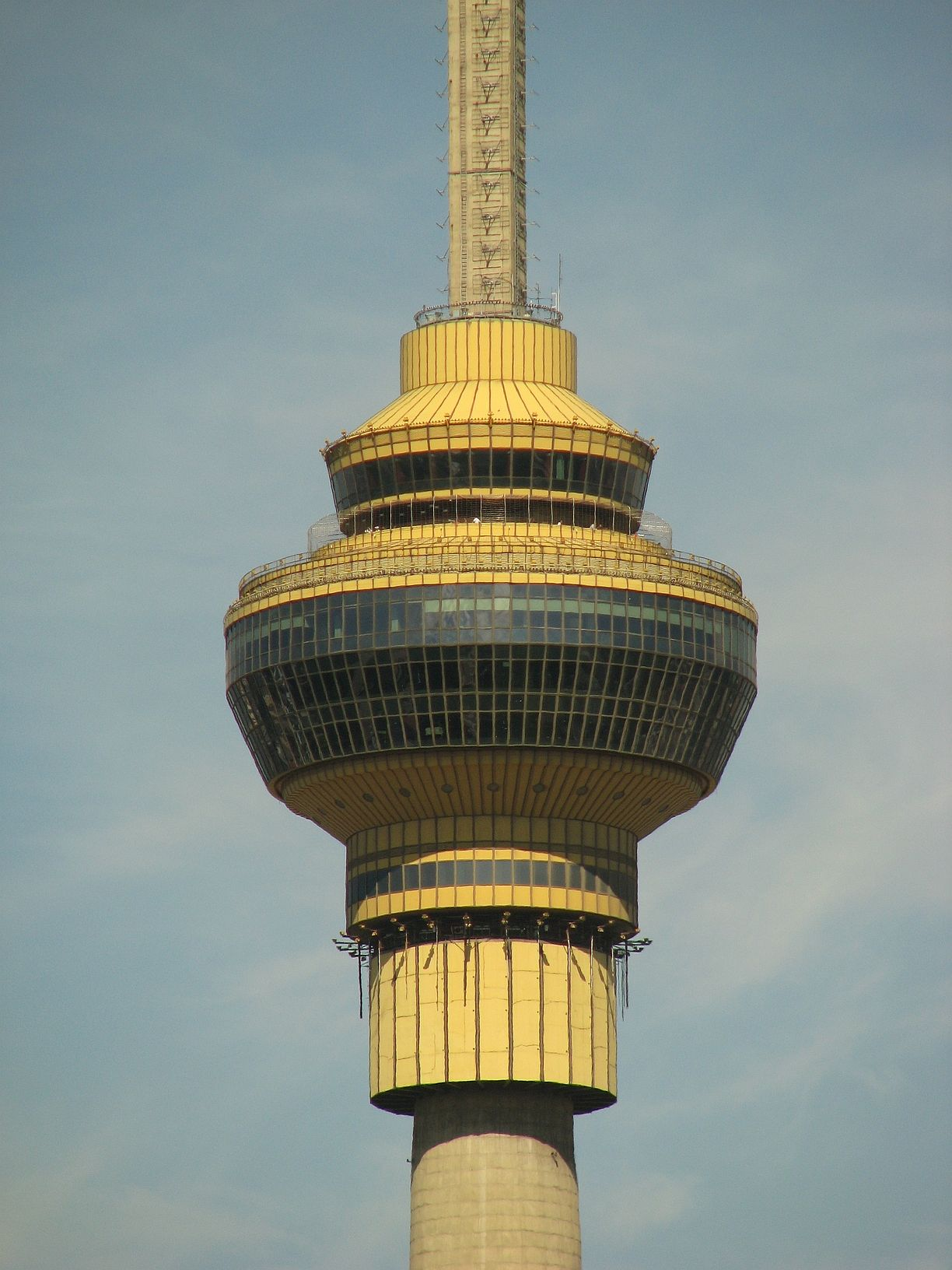
Central TV Tower

=== Beijing ===
- Carousel Revolving Restaurant, Xiyuan Hotel, Beijing
- Revolving Restaurant, China Central Television Tower, Beijing
- Starlight Revolving Restaurant, Beijing International Hotel, Beijing
- Summit Club Restaurant and Lounge, Hotel Kunlun, Beijing

=== Chengdu ===
- Restaurant Grande, West Pearl Tower, Chengdu

=== Chongqing ===
- Jiuchongtian (Cloud 9) Revolving Restaurant, Yu Du Hotel {Jiefangbei CBD}, Chongqing

=== Dalian ===
- Mingzhu Revolving Restaurant, Bohai Grand Hotel, Dalian
- Revolving Restaurant, Bohai Pearl Hotel, Dalian
- Revolving Restaurant, Dalian Radio and TV Tower, Dalian

=== Guangdong Province ===
==== Guangzhou ====
- Carousel Restaurant, Garden Hotel, Guangzhou
- Revolving Restaurant, Aiqun Hotel, Guangzhou
- Sky Cafe-Revolving Restaurant, Guangdong Asia International Hotel, Guangzhou

==== Shenzhen ====
- Guomao Revolving Restaurant, Shenzhen International Trade Center, Shenzhen
- Sky Paradise, Panglin Hotel, Shenzhen
- Tiara, Shangri La Hotel, Shenzhen
- Phoenix Court Restaurant, Baolilai International Hotel, Shenzhen

==== Zhaoqing ====
- Revolving Restaurant, Pearl Hotel Starlake, Zhaoqing

==== Zhongshan ====
- City-view Revolving Restaurant, Fuhua Hotel, Zhongshan

=== Hangzhou ===
- J Western Restaurant, Tianyuan Tower Hotel, Hangzhou
- Restaurant Café and Bar, Friendship Hotel, Hangzhou

=== Hong Kong ===
- 26/F, Wu Sang House, Mong Kok, Kowloon, Hong Kong (1966–1996)
- The Grand Buffet, Level 62, Hopewell Centre, Wan Chai, Hong Kong

=== Macau ===
- 360° Café, Macau Tower, Macau
- Rotunda Revolving Restaurant, Metro Park Hotel, Macau

=== Shanghai ===
- Art 50, Hotel Novotel Shanghai Atlantis, Shanghai
- Blue Heaven Revolving Restaurant, Jin Jiang Tower, Shanghai
- Epicure on 45, Radisson Blu Hotel Shanghai New World, Shanghai
- Oriental Pearl Revolving Restaurant, Oriental Pearl Tower, Shanghai

=== Suzhou ===
- Revolving Restaurant, Aster Hotel, Suzhou

=== Tianjin ===
- Revolving Restaurant, Tianjin Radio and Television Tower, Tianjin (closed, now a revolving library)

=== Wenzhou ===
- Revolving Restaurant, Wenzhou International Hotel, Wenzhou

=== Wuhan ===
- Panorama Restaurant, Holiday Inn Wuhan-Riverside, Wuhan

== Colombia ==
- El Giratorio Restaurant, Hotel Dann Carlton, Barranquilla
- Restaurante La Fragata Giratorio, World Trade Center, Bogotá
- Tony Roma's, Hotel Dann Carlton, Medellín

== Egypt ==
- 360-The Revolving Restaurant, Cairo Tower, Cairo
- The Revolving Restaurant, Grand Hyatt Cairo

== Finland ==
- Näsinneula tower, Tampere
- Puijo tower, Kuopio

== Germany ==
- 360° Drehrestaurant im Wildpark Hotel, Bad Marienberg
- Panoramabar im Vital Hotel der Rhein-Main-Therme, Hofheim
- Fernmeldeturm, Mannheim
- Florianturm, Dortmund (oldest revolving restaurant in the world; closed to general public since 2015, now only available for private event bookings)
- Henninger Turm, Frankfurt am Main (two revolving restaurants, closed in 2002 and tower since demolished)
- Hotel Steinwaldhaus, Drehlokal, Erbendorf
- Olympiaturm, Munich (at Olympic Park)
- Rheinturm, Düsseldorf
- Telecafé, Berliner Fernsehturm, Berlin
- Water Tower Belvedere, Aachen

== Greece ==
- OTE Tower, Thessaloniki

== Guatemala ==
- El Giratorio de Vista Quince, Guatemala City

== Iceland ==
- Perlan, Reykjavík

== India ==
- High Park – One of Asia's Only Open-air Revolving Bar and Restaurants, Mysore, Karnataka
- Stellar – The Revolving Restaurant, Hotel Drona Palace, Kashipur, Uttarakhand

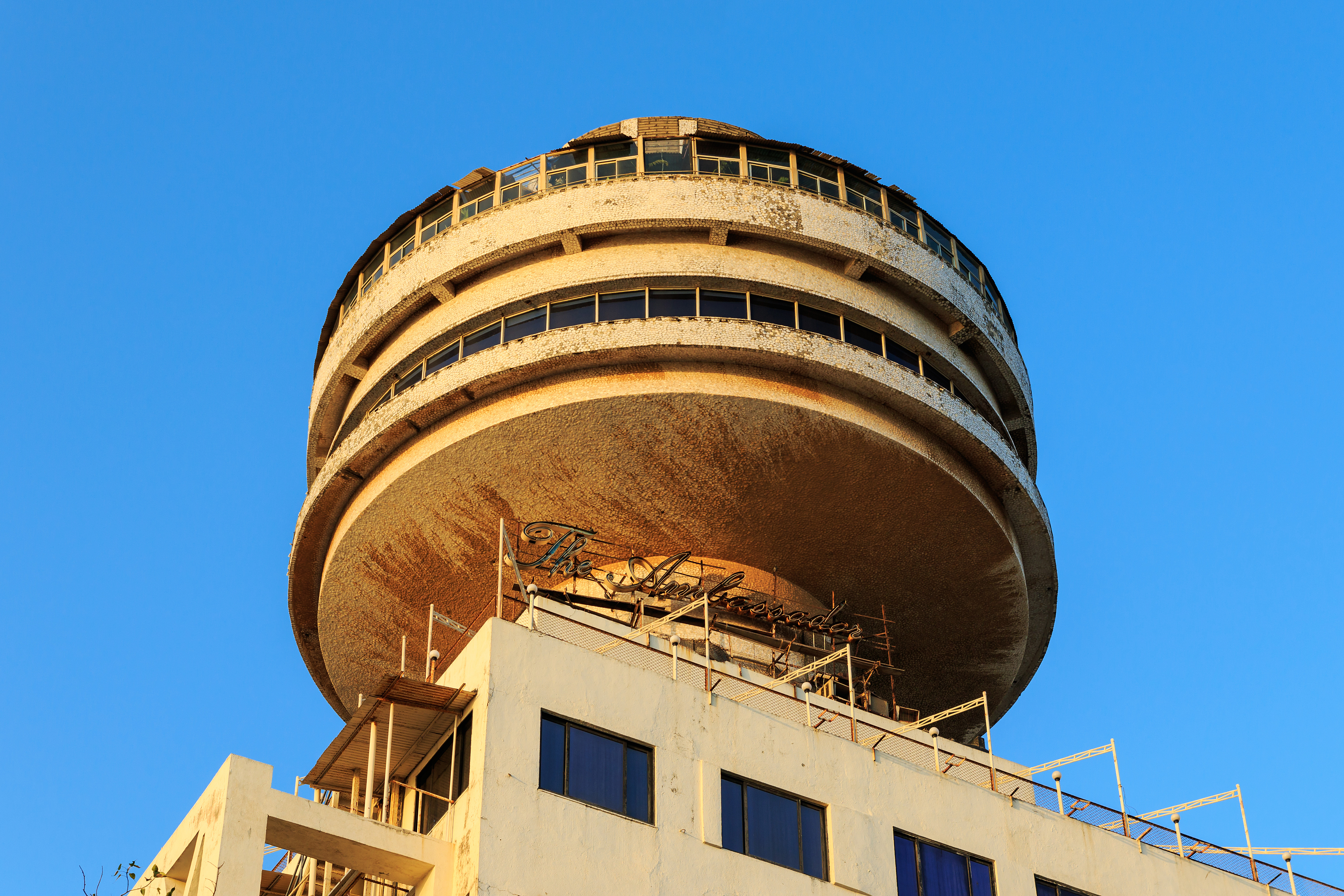
Tower of Ambassador Hotel, Mumbai

- 360 Degree Revolving Restaurant, Pune, Maharashtra
- 4X International, Ludhiana
- Pind Balluchi 18th Floor, Biscomaun Tower, Patna, Bihar
- Aasma Restaurant, Panchkula, Haryana
- Ansal Plaza, Sonepat, Haryana
- Carnival Heights, Chennai
- Chicago Revolving Restaurant, Ernakulam
- Falak, Hotel K.C Residency, Jammu city
- Kandeel, Tex Palazzo Hotel, Surat (Asia's first revolving hotel)
- Kashish Restaurant, Sirsa District
- Om Revolving Restaurant, Jaipur
- Parikrama, New Delhi
- Patang Hotel, Ahmedabad, Gujarat, India
- The Pearl of the Orient, Ambassador Hotel, Mumbai, Maharashtra
- Revolving Restaurant, Hotel Howard International, Mussoorie
- Sahib Revolving Restaurant, Ludhiana
- UFO Revolving restaurant Mumbai, Maharashtra
- Cloud 7 Revolving restaurant, RS Sarovar Portico Palampur, Himachal Pradesh

== Indonesia ==
- Panyawangan Restaurant, Hotel Panghegar, Bandung

== Iran ==
Milad Tower

- Abadgaran Hotel, Mashhad
- Aseman Hotel, Isfahan
- Bolour Tower, Tabriz
- Borj-e Sefid (the White Tower), Tehran
- Cheshm andaz tower, Ramsar, Mazandaran
- El Goli Hotel, Tabriz
- Enghelab Hotel, Tehran
- Eram Grand Hotel, Kish Island
- Mahestan Shopping center, Karaj
- Milad Tower (Borj-e Milad), Tehran
- Moali Abad, Shiraz
- Mosala, Isfahan
- Narmafzar Tower, Emperor Restaurant, Ahwaz
- Narnjestan Hotel, Noor
- Revolving Restaurant, Grand Hotel Shiraz
- Saeedi Center, Qom
- Yademen Tower, Gorgan
- Borj-e Sefid (the White Tower), Urmia
- Gandomak, Urmia

== Iraq ==
- Baghdad Tower
- Grand Millennium Hotel, Sulaimani

== Japan ==
=== Hokkaido ===
- Hotel Neuschloss, Otaru (not currently rotating)
- Restaurant Rondo, Century Royal Hotel, Sapporo (closed in 2024, building demolished)

=== Tōhoku ===
- Sky Restaurant Familio, Kanpuzan Revolving Observatory, Oga, Akita (observatory rotating, but restaurant floor doesn't)
- Kakunodate Plaza Hotel, Kakunodate, Akita (closed in 2014, building demolished)

=== Kantō ===
- Koma Observatory, Mount Tsukuba (observatory open, but not currently rotating)
- THE Sky, Hotel New Otani, Tokyo (restaurant open, but not currently rotating)
- Ginza Sky Lounge in Yūrakuchō, Tokyo (formerly rotated counterclockwise; stopped rotating in 2021 when the Tokyo earthquake damaged the machinery)
- Prince Kaikan, Kamata, Tokyo (not currently open)
- Blue sky lounge, Matsudo Building, Matsudo, Chiba (currently closed)
- Hotel New Tsukamoto, Chiba (restaurant open, but not currently rotating)
- Hotel Empire, Yokohama (now the library building of the university)

=== Chūbu ===
- Tee Horn, Kaida Plateau, Nagano
- Enakyo Kokusai Hotel, Gifu (not currently rotating)
- T-FACE, Toyota, Aichi (not currently rotating)

=== Kansai ===
- KOCHI TO UMI, Todaya Hotel, Toba, Mie
- Top of Kyoto, Rihga Royal Hotel, Kyoto
- M! Nara, Nara (not currently rotating)
- Rakutaian restaurant, OMM Building, Osaka (closed in 2021)
- Kobe Port Tower, Kobe (restaurant reopened as rotating cafe/bar)
- Sumaura Revolving Observatory, Sumaurayama, Hyōgo (currently out of order)

=== Chūgoku ===
- Kyoyama Solar Green Park, Okayama (the floor is currently not rotating)
- Hiroshima Kokusai Hotel, Hiroshima (not currently rotating)

=== Kyūshū ===
- Sun Sky Hotel, Kokura (restaurant is not currently open)
- Saint City, Kokura (restaurant is not currently open)
- Hakata Port Tower, Hakata (not currently rotating)
- Hotel Clio Court Hakata, Hakata (not currently rotating)

=== Okinawa ===
- Akebono-Okisho Building, Naha, Okinawa (not currently rotating)
- Novotel Okinawa Naha Hotel, Naha, Okinawa (not currently rotating)
- Zephyr Naha Tower, Naha, Okinawa (demolished in 2014)

== Kazakhstan ==
- Revolving restaurant, Astana

== Kenya ==
- Kenyatta International Conference Centre, located on the 28th floor of the KICC Tower, in the Central Business District of Kenya's Capital city, Nairobi
- 360 Grills & Lounges – Valley View Office Park City Park Drive Rooftop, Tower 'B'

== Kuwait ==
- Kuwait Towers, Kuwait City
- Liberation Tower, Kuwait City

== Lebanon ==
- Monte Alberto Hotel and Restaurant, Zahle

== Libya ==
- Al Mat'am al-Hawar Burj al-Fateh, Tripoli

== Lithuania ==
- Paukščių takas, Vilnius TV Tower, Vilnius

== Malaysia ==
- @mosphere, Kota Kinabalu
- Bayview Hotel, George Town, Penang
- Bintang Restaurant (not revolving 2019), The Federal Kuala Lumpur
- Menara Alor Setar, Alor Setar
- Menara Kuala Lumpur, Kuala Lumpur

== Mexico ==
- Bellini Restaurante, World Trade Center Mexico City

== Nepal ==
- Revolving Restaurant, Airport Hotel, Sinamangal, Kathmandu
- Revolving Restaurant, Ratna Plaza, Dharmapath, New road, Kathmandu

== The Netherlands ==
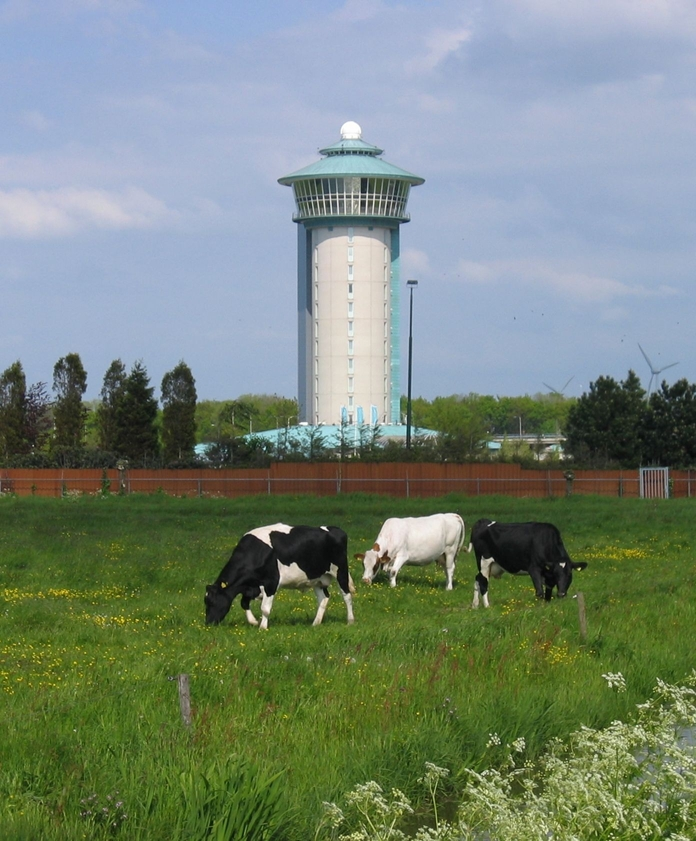
De Koperen Hoogte, revolving restaurant and hotel in former water tower

- De Koperen Hoogte, De Lichtmis, near Zwolle (reconstructed water tower)
- Moon, Adam tower, Amsterdam
- UFO, Rotterdam

== New Caledonia ==
- Le 360°, Ramada Plaza, Nouméa

== New Zealand ==
- Orbit, Sky Tower, Auckland

== North Korea ==
- Hyangsan Hotel, Myohyang-san
- Koryo Hotel, Pyongyang; two revolving restaurants, but only one in operation
- Ryanggang Hotel, Pyongyang
- Ryugyong Hotel, Pyongyang; five revolving restaurant levels, none of which have yet opened
- Yanggakdo International Hotel, Pyongyang

== Norway ==
- Egon Tårnet, Tyholttårnet, Trondheim

== Pakistan ==
- KHIVA Revolving Restaurant, Islamabad
- Port Tower Complex, Karachi
- The Revolving Restaurant, Karachi

== Philippines ==
- 100 Revolving Restaurant, Quezon City
- Pasig Revolving Tower, Pasig

== Qatar ==
- Aspire Tower, Doha

== Russia ==
- Seventh Heaven, Ostankino Tower, Moscow was highest in 1967–75

== Saudi Arabia ==
- Al Faisaliyah Center, Riyadh

== Serbia ==
- Grand Hotel Tornik-Sky Revolving restaurant, Zlatibor
- Genex Tower, Belgrade

== Singapore ==
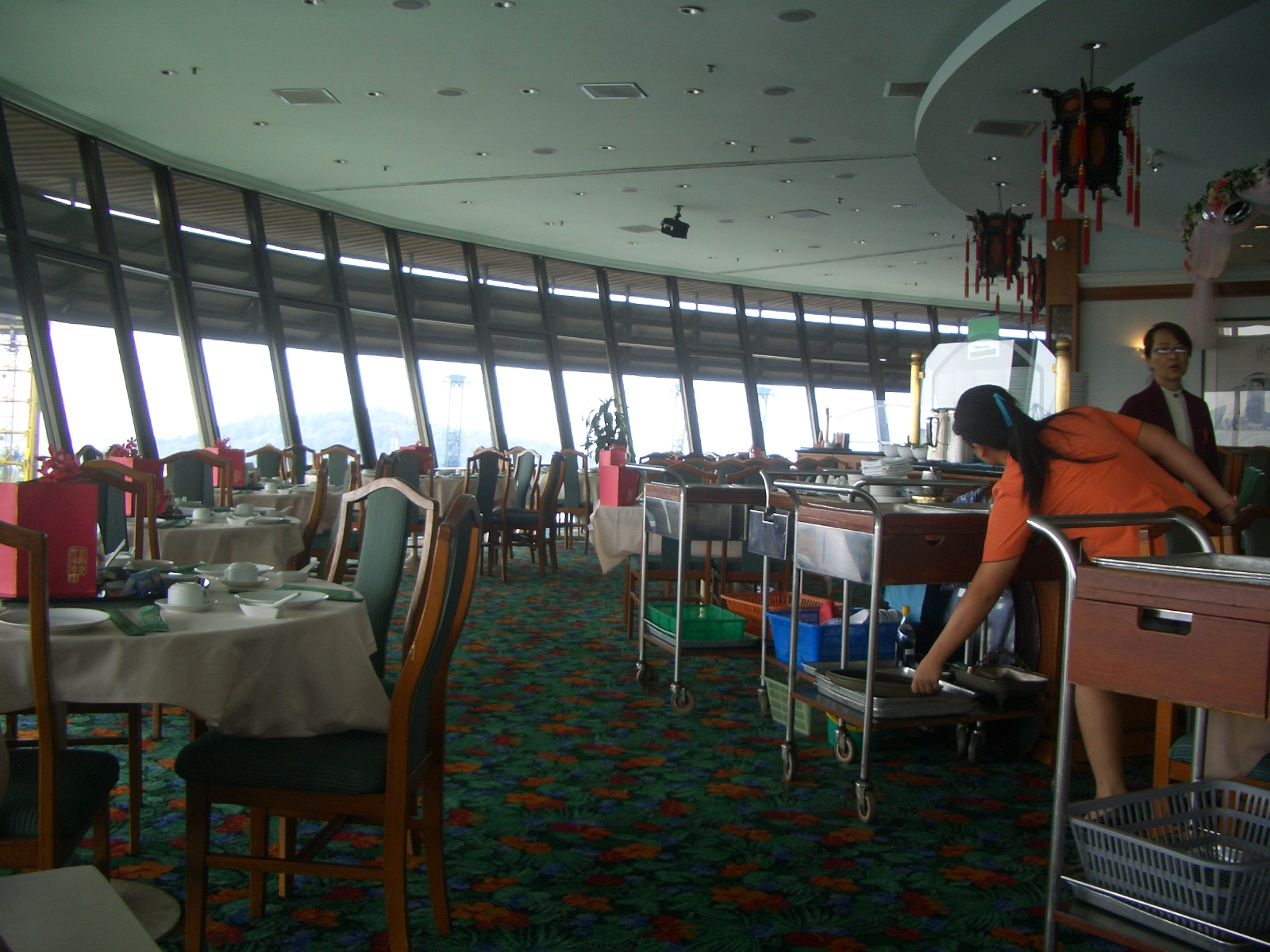
Prima Tower Revolving Restaurant, Singapore

- Meritus Mandarin Singapore (not currently revolving)
- Prima Tower Revolving Restaurant, Prima Tower (closed since 6 April 2020)
- Tong Le Dining, Collyer Quay

== Slovakia ==
- VEŽA, Kamzík TV Tower, Bratislava
- Most SNP, Bratislava

== South Africa ==
- Revolving Restaurant, CR Swart Building, Bloemfontein (closed)
- Roma Revolving Restaurant, Durban
- Heinrich's Restaurant, Hillbrow Tower, Johannesburg

== South Korea ==
- n•Grill, Namsan Seoul Tower

== Sri Lanka ==
- Blue Orbit by Citrus, Lotus Tower Colombo (Also South Asia's tallest restaurant)

== Switzerland ==
- Hoher Kasten
- Le Kuklos, Leysin
- Mittelallalin, above Saas-Fee (world's highest)
- Piz Gloria, on the summit of Schilthorn, near Mürren
- Stanserhorn
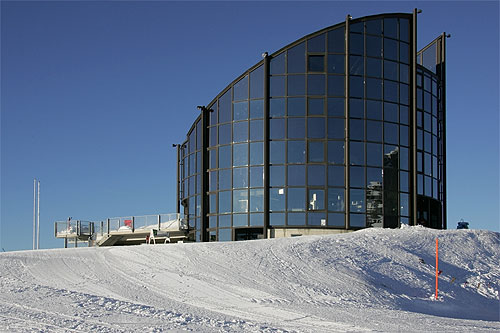
Le Kuklos, Leysin

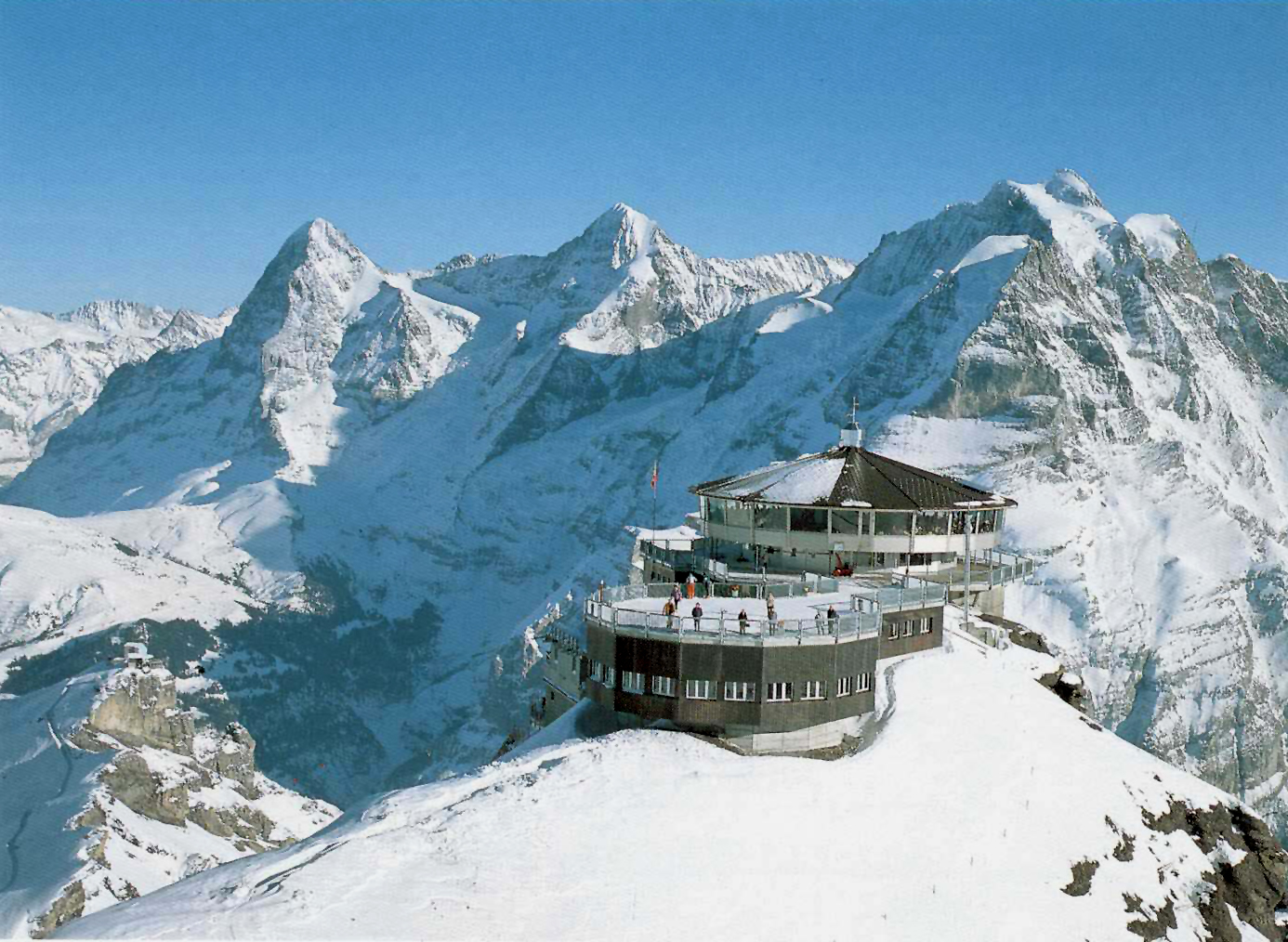
The Piz Gloria

== Syria ==
- Cham Palace Hotel, Damascus

== Taiwan ==
- Star Tower Restaurant, Taipei
- UFO Revolving Restaurant, Taichung

== Tanzania ==
- Akemi Restaurant, Golden Jubilee PSPF Towers, Dar es Salaam
- Mapinduzi Revolving Restaurant, Mapinduzi Square, Muembe Kiosonge, Zanzibar City

== Thailand ==
- Club Lounge, Grand China Princess Hotel, Bangkok
- Pattaya Park Beach hotel, Pattaya
- Phu Jaya Mini Resort & Restaurant, Chiang Mai
- River City Hotel Mukdahan

== Trinidad and Tobago ==
- 360 Revolving Restaurant, Radisson Hotel Trinidad, Port of Spain

== Turkey ==
- Atakule Tower, Ankara
- Endem TV Tower, Istanbul

== Uganda ==
- 7 Hills Revolving Restaurant, Golf Course Hotel, Kampala

== United Arab Emirates ==
- Al Dawaar, Hyatt Regency, Dubai
- Stratos, Le Royal Meridien, Abu Dhabi
- Tiara, Marina Mall, Abu Dhabi

== United Kingdom ==
- Butlins Top of the Tower Restaurant, BT Tower, London (closed in 1980)
- Lakeview Restaurant, Center Parcs Elveden Forest (closed in November 2016)
- St. John's Beacon, Liverpool (closed in 1979, then reopened in 1980 before closing for good in 1983; now a radio station and no longer revolves)

There are now no remaining functional revolving restaurants in the UK.

== United States ==
=== Alabama ===
- The Renaissance Shoals Hotel & Spa, Florence

=== Arizona ===
- Compass Restaurant, Hyatt Regency Phoenix, Phoenix

=== California ===
- BonaVista Lounge, Westin Bonaventure Hotel, Los Angeles (LA Prime Restaurant directly above does not rotate)
- Regency Club, Hyatt Regency, San Francisco (open to the public as Equinox Restaurant 1974–2007; reopened 2024 exclusively for registered guests and as a special event space)

=== Florida ===
- CK's at Tampa International Airport. Closed in 2013; structure remains in use an event space, but does not rotate
- Garden Grill, Epcot, Walt Disney World Resort, Lake Buena Vista
- Grand Plaza Hotel & Resort, Spinners overlooking the Gulf of Mexico, St. Pete Beach, Florida
- Pier 66 Resort, Pier Top Lounge (21+), Fort Lauderdale, Florida

=== Georgia ===
- Polaris, Hyatt Regency Atlanta, Atlanta
- Sun Dial, Westin Peachtree Plaza Hotel, Atlanta (no longer revolves after 2017 accident)

=== Hawaii ===
- La Ronde, Ala Moana Center, Honolulu (closed), designed by John Graham & Company; opened in 1961; the first revolving restaurant in the United States, preceding the SkyCity "Eye of the Needle" atop the Space Needle in Seattle (also designed by John Graham)

=== Illinois ===
- Ventana's, Rosemont (closed to the public; only open for receptions, parties)

=== Indiana ===
- Eagle's Nest, Hyatt Regency Indianapolis, Indianapolis

=== Kentucky ===
- Eighteen, Radisson Hotel Cincinnati Waterfront, Covington
- Galt House, Louisville (dual revolving floorplates)
- Spire, Hyatt Regency Louisville, Louisville (only used for special events/receptions since 2007, not open to the public)

=== Minnesota ===
- Harbor 360, Radisson Hotel Duluth Harborview, Duluth

=== Nevada ===
- Top of the World, The Strat, Las Vegas
- Whiskey Licker Up rotating bar, Binion's Hotel & Casino, Las Vegas, Nevada

=== New York ===
- The View, New York Marriott Marquis, New York City
- The Changing Scene, First Federal Plaza, Rochester (closed permanently)

=== Northern Marianas Islands ===
- 360 Restaurant, Susupe, Saipan

=== South Carolina ===
- Top of Carolina, University of South Carolina, Columbia; only open for Friday lunch and Sunday brunch during university's calendar year

=== Texas ===
- Reunion Tower, Dallas (no longer rotating after 2023 renovation)
- Tower of the Americas, San Antonio
- Spindletop at Hyatt Regency Houston Downtown

=== Virginia ===
- Skydome Lounge, Doubletree Hotel Crystal City at National Airport, Arlington

=== Wisconsin ===
- The Gobbler, Johnson Creek (bar only – closed 1992, reopened as Gobbler Theater, closed in 2021)

== Uruguay ==
- La Vista, in Punta del Este (open for lunch and dinner)

== Uzbekistan ==
- Koinot, Tashkent Tower, Tashkent

== Venezuela ==
- Hotel El Paseo, Restaurante El Girasol, Maracaibo, Zulia
- Hotel Pipo Internacional, Maracay, Aragua

== See also ==
- Lists of restaurants
