= List of hotels in North Korea =

This is a list of hotels in North Korea.

== Hotels in Pyongyang ==
Name	Image	Information
Chongnyon Hotel (aka Youth Hotel)		Located in Mangyongdae District on Kwangbok Street, Pyongyang, the capital city of North Korea. It has 30 floors, and opened in 1989.
Haebangsan Hotel		Opened in 1962, this is the only second-class hotel open to tourists in Pyongyang. This hotel is located in Pyongyang Central District near the Taedong Bridge and Grand People's Study House. The hotel has 5 floors, 113 rooms, one restaurant, three bars, a hairdresser's, a bar, a spa, a souvenir shop and a karaoke area. However, the rooms here are not considered as comfortable as in the Koryo or Yanggakdo Hotels.
Koryo Hotel		The second largest operating hotel in North Korea. The twin-towered building is 143 metres (469 ft) tall and contains 43 stories. It was erected in 1985.
Pothonggang Hotel		This hotel has 162 rooms.
Moranbong Hotel		Located inside the Moran Park on the scenic Moranbong hill between the TV Tower and the Kim Il Sung Arch of Triumph, near the Kim Il Sung Stadium. The hotel is very small with only 12 rooms (1 First Class Room and 11 Third Class Rooms) but he most luxurious hotel in North Korea.
Ryanggang Hotel		Located in the Mangyongdae District of North Korea, it has 330 rooms.
Ryugyong Hotel		A 105-storey pyramid-shaped skyscraper still under construction in Pyongyang, North Korea. Its name ("capital of willows") is also one of the historical names for Pyongyang. The building is also known as the "105 Building", a reference to its number of floors. Construction began in 1987 but was halted in 1992 as North Korea entered a period of economic crisis after the fall of the Soviet Union. In April 2008, work on the building was restarted by the Orascom Group. In July 2011, the exterior work was complete. Features that Orascom has installed include exterior glass panels and telecommunications antennas. In September 2012 photographs taken by Koryo Tours were released, showing the interior for the very first time.
Sosan Hotel		This hotel has 510 rooms and 30 floors.
Yanggakdo International Hotel		The largest working hotel and the second tallest building in North Korea, after the Ryugyong Hotel. The hotel is located on Yanggakdo (Yanggak Island), two kilometers to the south-east of the center of Pyongyang, the nation's capital. It rises to an overall height of 170 metres (560 ft) and has a slowly revolving restaurant on the 47th floor. The hotel is said to contain 1,000 rooms and a total floor space of 87,870 square metres (945,800 sq ft).
Pyongyang Hotel		The hotel is located on the bank of the Taedong River. Facilities of the hotel include a currency exchange desk, a banquet hall, a coffee shop, a gift shop, different meeting and lecture rooms, a spa, a sports facility and a karaoke room. The hotel also offer Korean and Japanese-style restaurants. A laundry and dry-cleaning service is also available.
Changgwangsan Hotel		Located in the Central District of Pyongyang, the hotel offers different types of rooms. The hotel offers the services of a currency exchange desk, a banquet hall, a coffee shop, private dining rooms, a soft drinks bar, a karaoke room, a book and tailor's shop, a pool and spa, a fitness room and a beauty salon.

== Hotels in provincial cities ==
Name	Image	Information
Majon Beach Guesthouse – also known as Majon Bathing Resort, Majon Hotel, or Majon Beach Resort.		Described as "North Korea's Answer to Club Med", the hotel is considered one of the best hotels in the country. It consists of a village of cottages located at majon beach, Hamhung. Each cottage has several rooms and limited hot water supply. Travel to this resort is conducted by the Korean International Travel Company (KITC).
Hyangsan Hotel		Located near the International Friendship Exhibition in Myohyangsan. The 15-storey hotel contains a swimming pool, sauna and spa and a circular revolving restaurant.
Haeju Hotel		1980s Soviet-influenced hotel in the city of Haeju (rarely open to foreign tourists).
Janamsan Hotel		The Janamsan Hotel is in Kaesong. It has 43 rooms, billiards, a restaurant, and bar.
Kaesong Folk Hotel (aka Minsok Folk Custom Hotel)		Opened in 1989 and is housed in 19 traditional hanok style courtyard houses, many of which date to the Joseon Dynasty and retain their original furnishings. The complex has one hundred rooms.
Oekumgang Hotel		South Korean built hotel, up until 2008 was used to cater for South Korean tourists to the DPRK.
Kumgangsan Hotel		North Korean hotel rejuvenated by South Korean workers, located near Kumgansan resort.
Nampo Hot Spa Resort		20 km northwest from Nampo, consisting of seven villas with four apartments in each.
8 March Hotel		
Tongmyong Hotel		
Songdowon Hotel		Located in Wonsan.
Masikryong Hotel		
Begaebong Hotel		
Homestay		Private village constructed in a traditionally Korean style, containing approximately 20 two-storey cottages.
Chongjin Hotel		
Hotel Haegumgang		A floating hotel at Mount Kumgang port
Jongbangsan Hotel		The hotel is located at the foot of Mt. Jonbang, near the city of Sariwon in North Hwanghae Province. The hotel has three main buildings and was opened on October 20, 2021.

== Hotels in Rason Special Economic Zone ==
Name	Image	Information
Imperial Hotel and Casino		Owned by Hong Kong's Emperor Group, first opened in 2000.
Piphagak Hotel		

== See also ==
- Tourism in North Korea
