= Sosan =

Sosan may refer to:

- Sengcan (died 606), Chinese patriarch
- Seosan, Chungnam, a city in South Korea
- Seosan Daesa, a Korean warrior monk
- Sosan Hotel, hotel in North Korea

== People with the surname ==
- Sarah Adebisi Sosan (born 1956), Nigerian politician
