= Ryanggang Hotel =

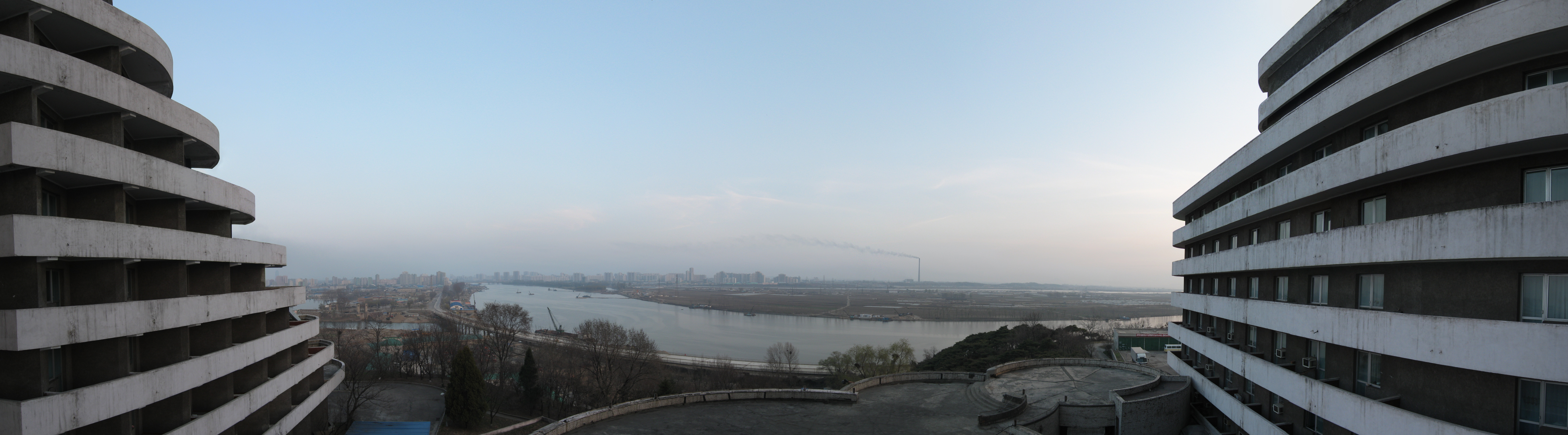
- View of the Taedong River from the hotel
- Interactive map of the Ryanggang Hotel area

General information
- Type: First class hotel
- Location: Mangyongdae District, Pyongyang, North Korea
- Coordinates: 39°0′16″N 125°41′37″E
- Opened: 1989

Technical details
- Floor area: 33,000 square metres

Other information
- Number of rooms: 330

The Ryanggang Hotel (량강호텔) is a first class hotel located in the Mangyongdae District of Pyongyang, North Korea. It has 330 rooms. The hotel was built in 1989 on a hill overlooking the Taedong and Pothong rivers, next to Seosan Football Stadium. The hotel covers an area of roughly 33,000 square metres and has two main buildings. There is a revolving restaurant on the top floor, and it has a library, billiard room, soft drink counter and shop.

== See also ==
- List of hotels in North Korea
- List of revolving restaurants
