= Chongnyon Hotel =

Hotel in Pyongyang, North Korea

- 청년호텔 (Korean)
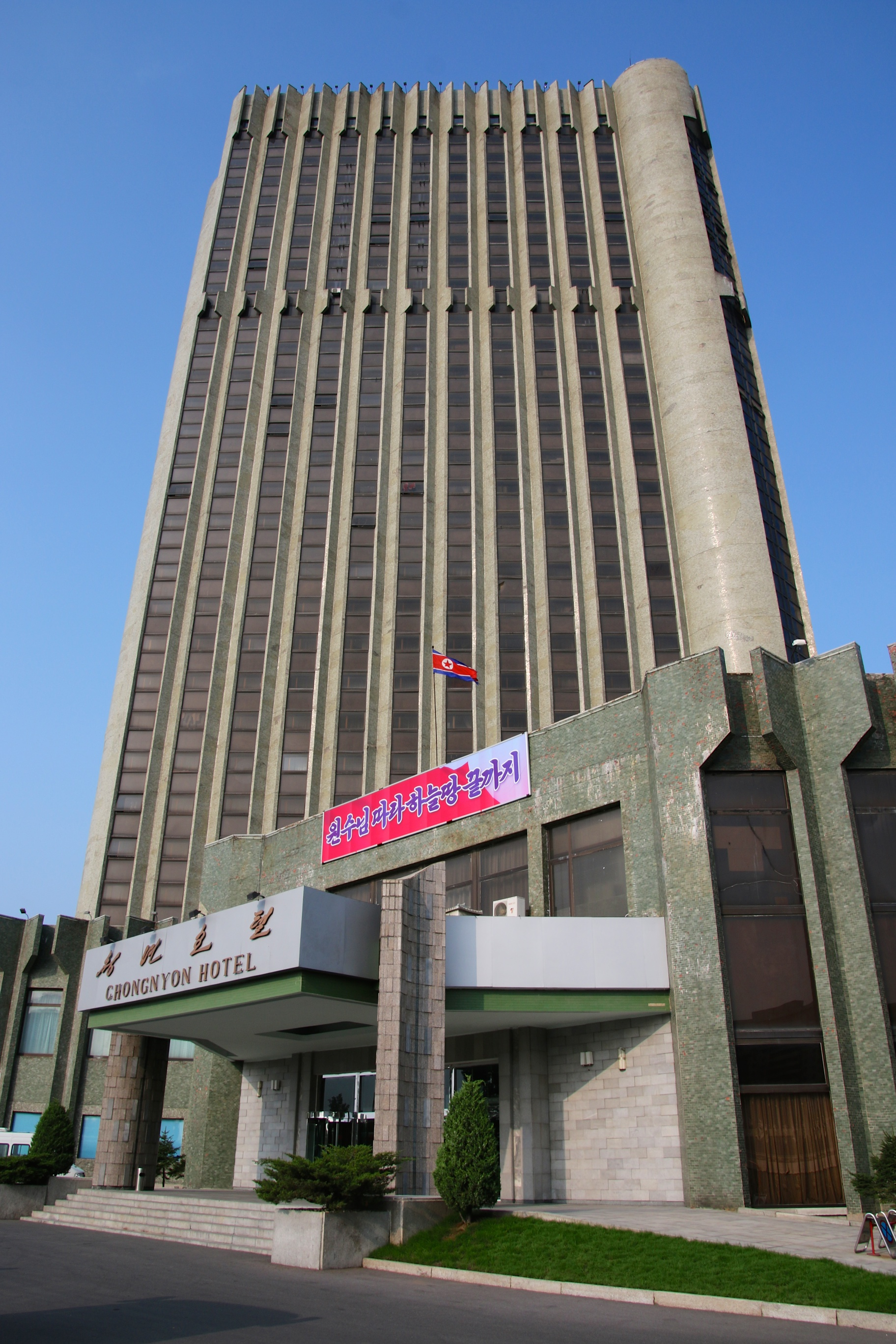
- Exterior of the Chongnyon Hotel

- Location within Pyongyang

General information
- Location: Gwangbog Street & Cheongchun Street, Pyongyang, North Korea
- Coordinates: 39.0259°N 125.6810°E
- Completed: 1 May 1989

Height
- Height: 351 feet (107 m)

Technical details
- Structural system: Concrete
- Floor count: 30
- Floor area: 41,000 sam

Other information
- Number of rooms: 900

- Chongnyon Hotel
- Hangul: 청년호텔
- Hanja: 靑年호텔
- RR: Cheongnyeon hotel
- MR: Ch'ŏngnyŏn hot'el

The Chongnyon Hotel (Youth Hotel) is a hotel located in the Mangyongdae District of Pyongyang, the capital city of North Korea. It was opened on May 1, 1989 and is situated on the junction of Chongchun Street and Kwangbok (Liberation) Street.

The hotel has 30 floors, with 900 rooms, and has a karaoke room and an outdoor swimming pool.

== See also ==
- List of tallest buildings in North Korea
- List of hotels in North Korea
- Tourism in North Korea
