= Sosan Stadium =

Football stadium in Pyongyang, North Korea

Coordinates: 39°0′19″N 125°41′29″E

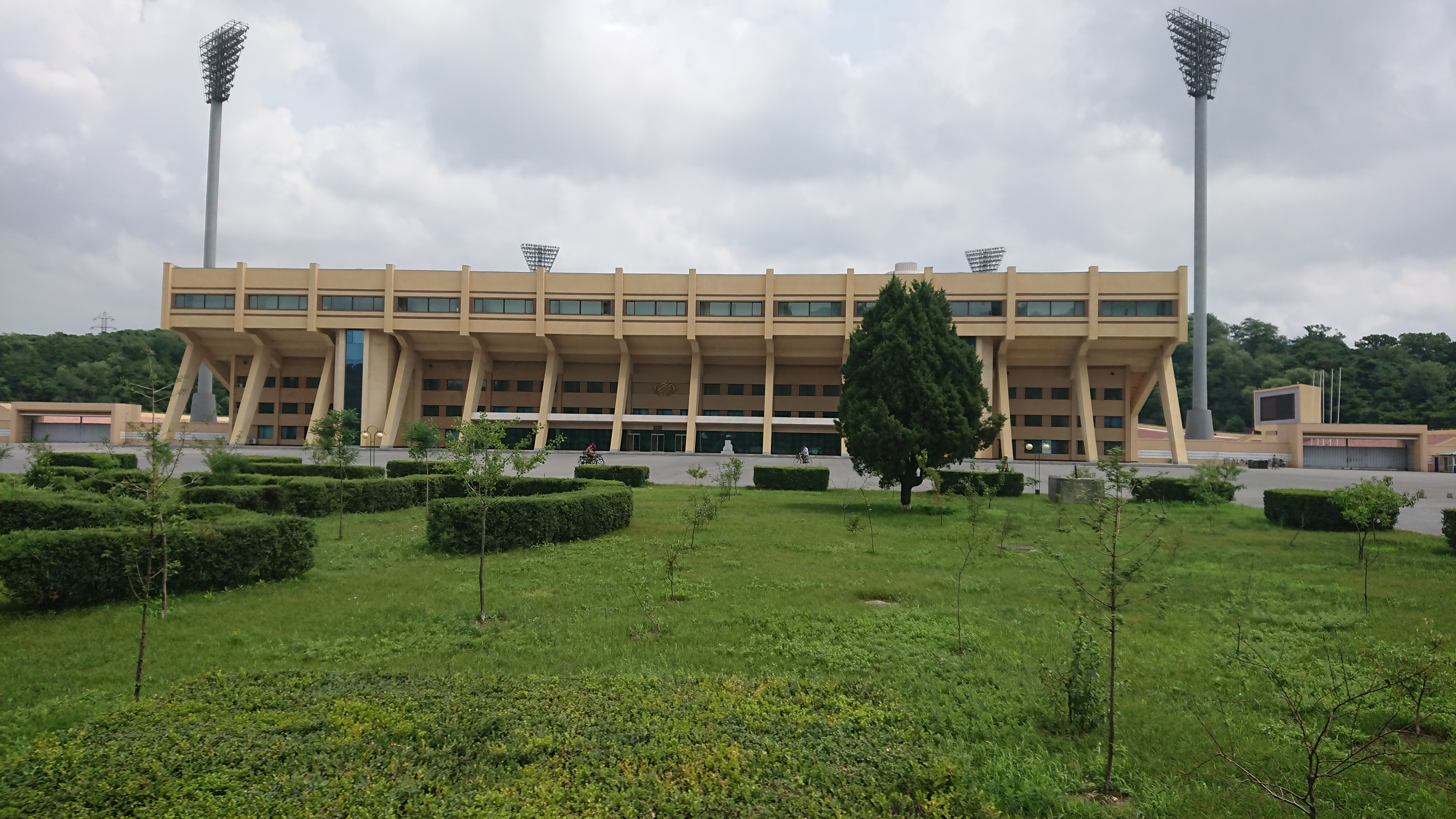
Sosan Stadium

Sŏsan Stadium (Korean: 서산축구경기장; Hancha: 西山足球競技場) is a football stadium in Pyongyang, North Korea. It is currently used mostly for football matches. The stadium holds 25,000 people, and was built by the North Korean army in 1988 for the 13th World Festival of Youth and Students. It lies next to Ryanggang Hotel which was completed around the same time in 1989.

The stadium was modernised in 2011, receiving a new artificial turf pitch to FIFA standards, an electronic scoreboard, new seats for spectators, and an improved medical facility.

The first round of the 2024–25 DPR Korea Premier Football League season was played at the Sŏsan Stadium.

== Public executions ==
The Sŏsan Stadium is reported to have been the site of public executions, notably those of former Director of the Planning and Financial Department of the Central Committee of the Workers’ Party, Pak Nam-gi and colleagues including Vice-Chairperson of the National Planning Commission on March 12, 2010 following the unpopular currency redenomination of the previous year. Eyewitness accounts suggest that these executions were performed by firing squad.

== See also ==
- List of football stadiums in North Korea
