= Yanggakdo International Hotel =

Hotel in Pyongyang, North Korea

Coordinates: 38°59′56.16″N 125°45′4.15″E

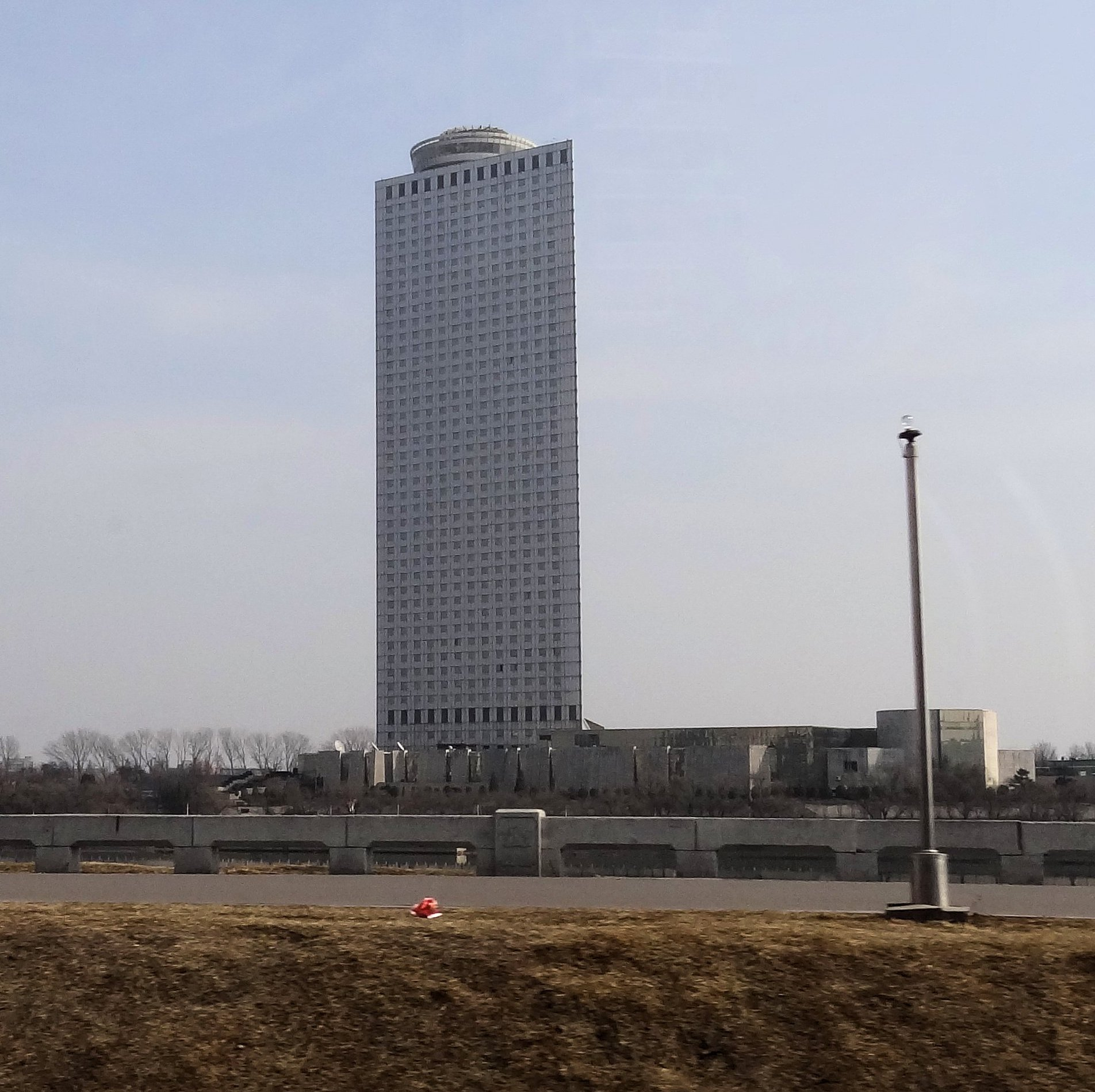

Korean name
- Hangul: 양각도국제호텔
- Hanja: 羊角島國際호텔
- RR: Yanggakdo gukje hotel
- MR: Yanggakto kukche hot'el

The Yanggakdo International Hotel is the largest operating hotel in North Korea, pending the completion of the Ryugyong Hotel, and the country's tenth-tallest building. The hotel is located on Yanggak Island in the River Taedong, two kilometres (1.2 mi) to the south-east of the centre of Pyongyang, the nation's capital. It rises to an overall height of 170 metres (560 ft) and has a slowly revolving restaurant on the 47th floor.

This hotel is North Korea's first luxury hotel. The structure was built between 1986 and 1992 by France's Campenon Bernard Construction Company and opened in 1996.

== Background ==
Besides housing the reception, the ground floor offers the purchase of North Korean currency sets, postcards and letters, and basic commodities at Western prices. There is a bar and a bookshop which stocks North Korean reading material including treatises of former leaders Kim Il Sung and Kim Jong Il.

In addition to the revolving restaurant, the hotel guide issued to guests indicates that the hotel contains four further restaurants on the second floor: dining-rooms one and two, the main banquet hall, and the Japanese, Chinese and Korean food dining-rooms.

The basement contains a bowling alley, a pool room, a sauna, a swimming pool, a barber shop, a casino, and a massage club.

The hotel's grounds originally included a 9,000-square-metre (97,000 sq ft) nine-hole golf course. In 2011 the golf course was demolished to make space for a Chinese-funded health complex to be built. Also located on Yanggak Island, next to the hotel's grounds, is the Pyongyang International Cinema Hall, one of the main venues for the Pyongyang International Film Festival.

== Fifth floor ==
The fifth floor of the hotel has been a source of curiosity among foreigners because it is off-limits to hotel guests and there is no fifth-floor button on the elevator panels. The fifth floor has occasionally been visited "unofficially" via staircase by tourists exploring the hotel. It is reported to be further split into two separate floors, with mostly locked rooms, and is decorated with propaganda posters. Tourists have also reported seeing alleged surveillance equipment apparently used to observe guests' rooms. One Western travel agency specialising in tours of North Korea has described the fifth floor as "actually just a service level much like would be found in any hotel, and strictly off limits to tourists."

== Otto Warmbier incident ==
On 2 January 2016, a visiting American university student, Otto Warmbier, was arrested on a charge of attempting to steal a political propaganda banner from a restricted area of the hotel. Although some media reports speculated that the incident had occurred on the hotel's fifth floor, Warmbier indicated in a confession that he took down the banner from a staff-only area of the second floor of the hotel, but abandoned the item after discovering it was too large to carry away. Staff members from the hotel testified against Warmbier at his trial. On 16 March 2016, Warmbier was sentenced to 15 years' imprisonment with hard labor. After seventeen months in captivity, it was revealed that Warmbier had suffered severe brain damage, and he was brought back to the United States in June 2017, dying six days later.

== Gallery ==
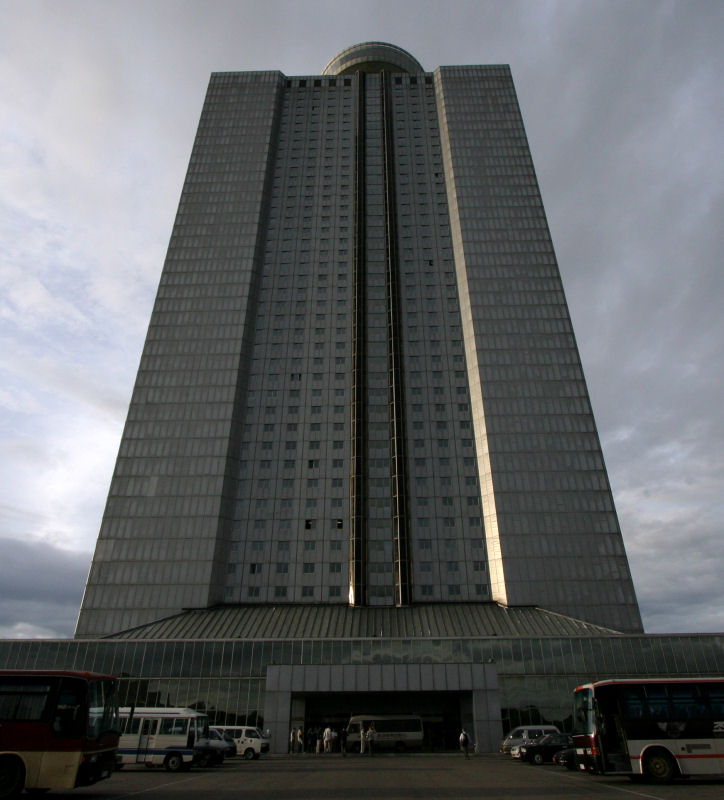
The hotel's facade seen from the ground level

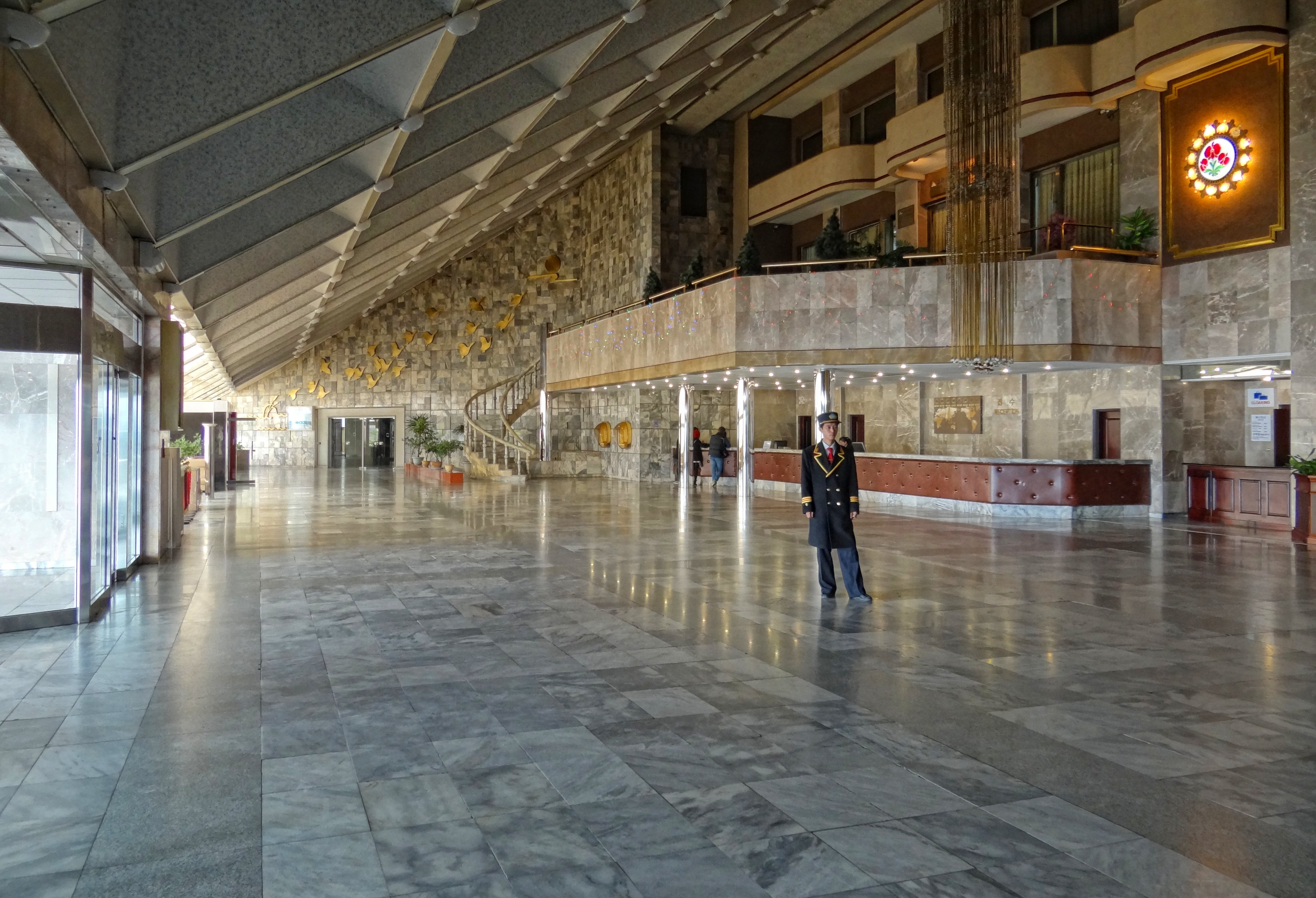
Hotel lobby area, March 2014

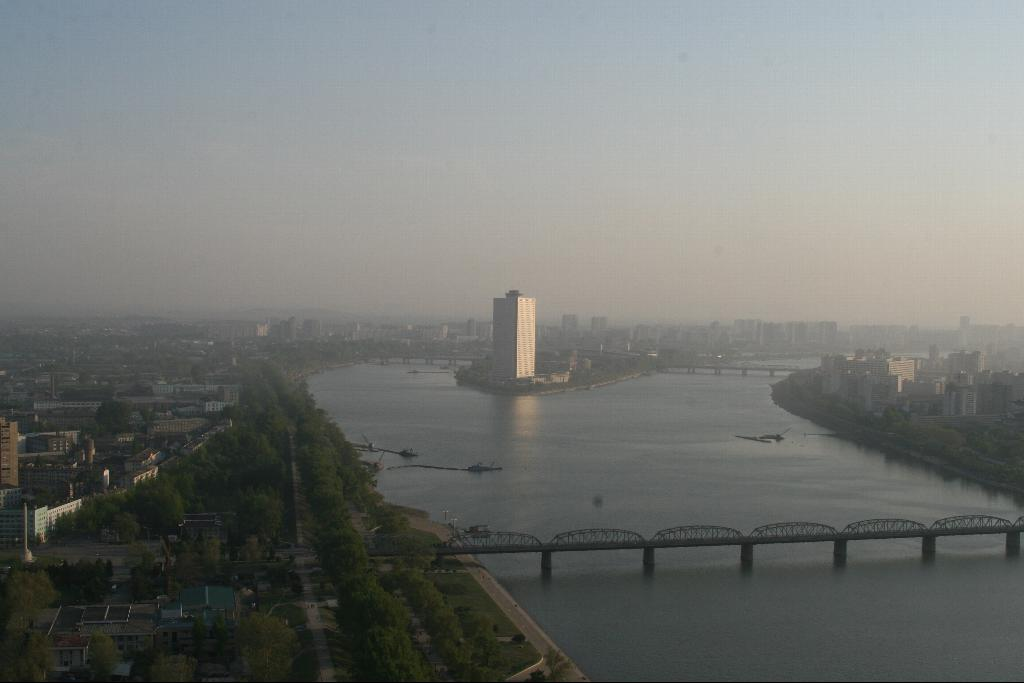
The hotel seen from the top of the Juche Tower

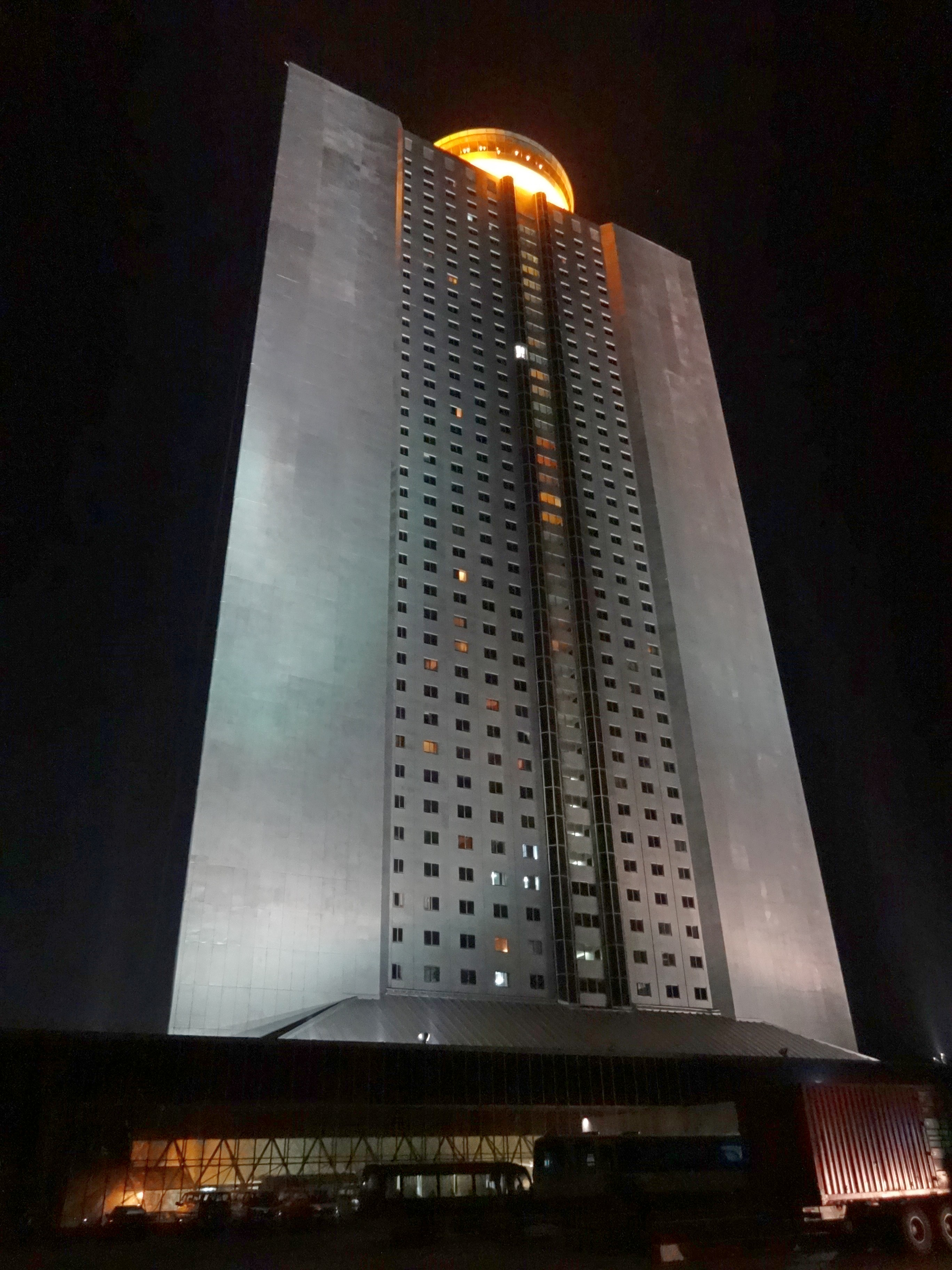
Front side of the hotel

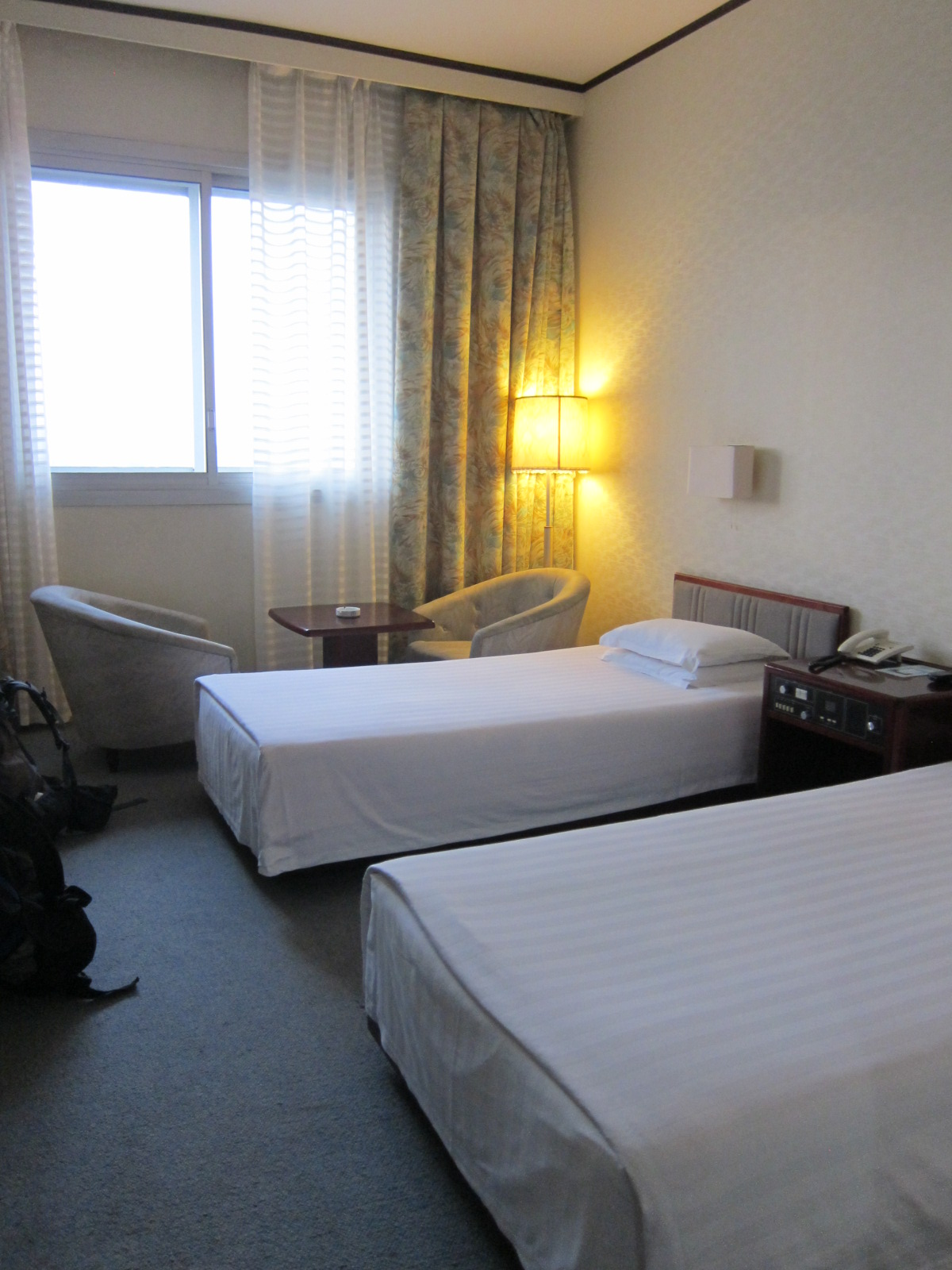
Standard-sized twin room

== See also ==
- Koryo Hotel
- Ryugyong Hotel
- List of hotels in North Korea
