= Sosan Hotel =

- 서산호텔 (Korean)
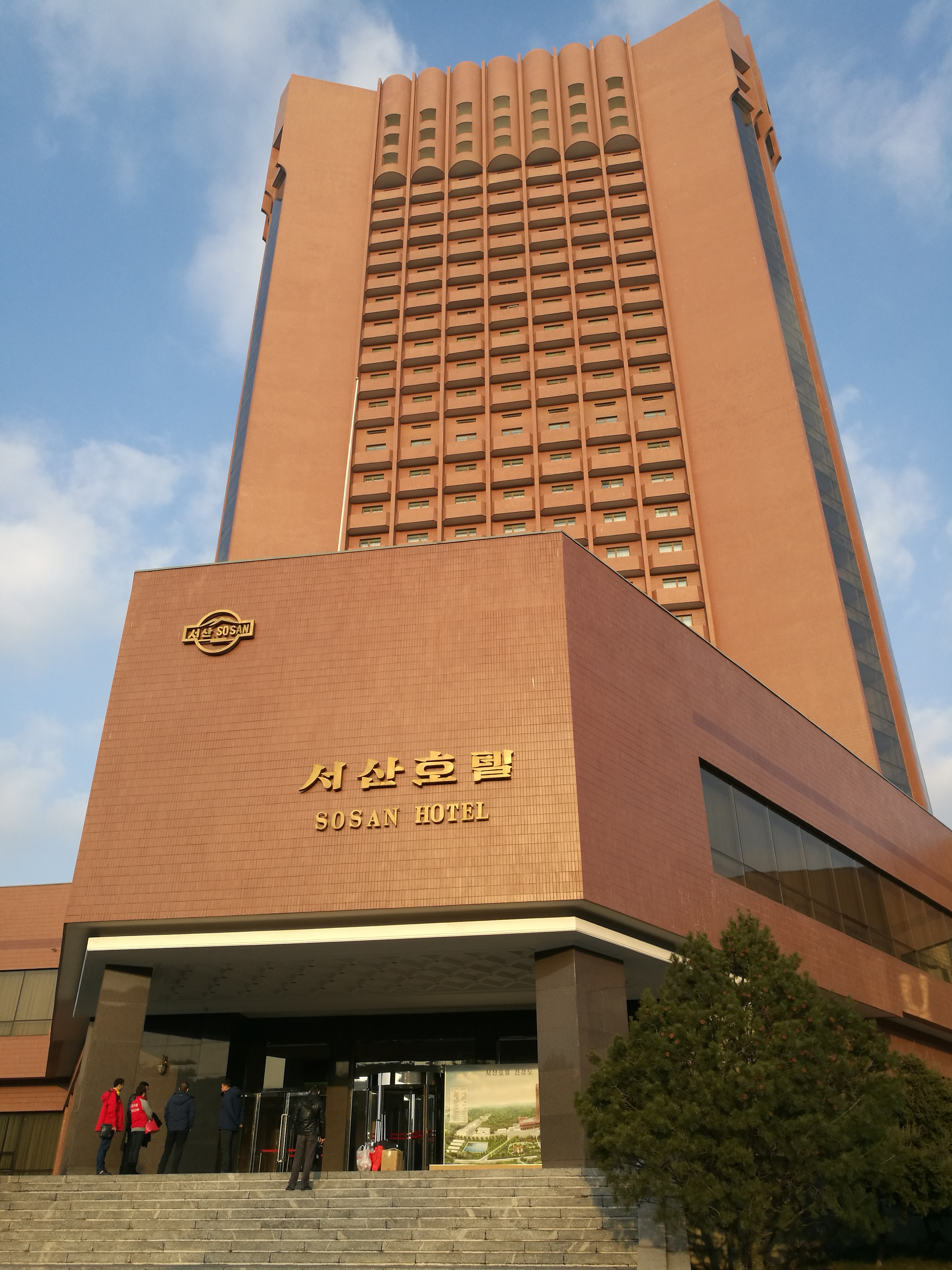

- Location within North Korea

General information
- Status: Completed
- Type: Hotel
- Classification: High-rise
- Location: Mangyongdae, Chongchun Street, Pyŏngyang, North Korea
- Coordinates: 39.0106°N 125.6925°E
- Completed: 1989

Height
- Height: 338.28 feet (103.11 m)

Technical details
- Floor count: 30

The Sosan Hotel (서산호텔) is a hotel located in Pyongyang, North Korea. It has a height of about 338.28 feet (103.11 m), with 30 floors and 510 rooms. It was built in 1989. Located roughly 4 kilometres (2.5 mi) from the railway station, it is run by the sports tourism company of North Korea. The hotel has a golf range.

The hotel was renovated in 2015 to commemorate the 70th anniversary of the founding of the Workers’ Party of Korea.

== See also ==
- List of hotels in North Korea
- List of tallest buildings in North Korea
