= OTE Tower =

- Interactive map of the OTE Tower area

General information
- Status: Completed
- Type: Television tower, Restaurant, Observation tower
- Location: Thessaloniki, Greece
- Coordinates: 40°37′34″N 22°57′16″E
- Completed: 1970
- Owner: Hellenic Telecommunications Organisation

Height
- Height: 76.4 m (250.66 ft)

Design and construction
- Architect: Alexandros Anastasiadis

OTE Tower is a 76-metre-tall tower located in the Thessaloniki International Exhibition Center in central Thessaloniki, Greece. The tower opened in 1970 and was renovated in 2005.

The tower was designed by Greek architect Alexandros Anastasiadis and was completed in 1968, with the first black and white broadcasts on a Greek television network taking place from the tower in 1971. The tower was also used in the 1970s to support the antennas of an experimental VHF analogue mobile telephone network. Today it is used by the Cosmote cellular mobile telephone network.

The tower today, other than its status as a modern monument of the city and its use by Cosmote, opens up for events and exhibitions during the Thessaloniki International Fair, while the Skyline Café-Bar, a revolving restaurant operates year-round on the top floor.

== History ==
=== Design and construction ===
The OTE Tower was designed by the architect Alexandros Anastasiadis in 1968, and its construction was completed in two phases.

==== First phase: Design, site selection and first floor ====
In the first phase (from 1966 to 1969) the general architectural and static stability study took place. Following extensive research, HELEXPO selected a 435 square meter area next to the TIF South Gate for the tower -initial studies designated it as a single floor technology demonstration pavilion- to be built. During this stage, engineer A. Aggelidis prepared the first draft of the plans, which were approved immediately and Apostolos Alexandropoulos secured the building contract in the TIF contest. Within the year the foundations were laid and the basement, floor level and first floor were also constructed for the yet unfinished 8.4-meter tall tower to serve as the OTE pavilion in the 34th Thessaloniki International Fair in September 1969.

==== Second phase: Tower completion and opening ====
In the second phase (from March to August 1970) the second, third, main observatory (4th) and fifth floors were constructed and the antenna mast was erected. The tower was formerly opened to the public for the first time in its current form in the 35th TIF in September 1970, featuring a state of the art rotating observatory platform designed and built by the Rohr company, which allowed tourists to admire a panoramic view of the city while seated.

=== Operation ===
==== 1970-2000 ====
The first black and white broadcasts of the Greek State Television (EPT) were transmitted from this building in 1971, a year after the Tower's completion. For a time, the tower was only being used as a television and radio broadcasting tower, being open to the public only during the TIF as an observatory platform, with the original 1971 rotation mechanism still in use. In the 1970s, during the first attempt to complete a state funded analogue mobile telephone network, the tower was used to mount the antennae for the Thessaloniki network. In 1983, the observatory's rotation mechanism was jammed, forcing the observatory to remain closed until the 2005 renovation and causing the lasting urban legend that the platform does not rotate (as of 2022 the renovated mechanism does operate normally). From 1988 and until at least 2010 the first floor used to house the main office of the Thessaloniki Radio (94.5) which also maintained a recording studio on the third floor, and the fifth floor housed a TIF-OTE joint television station used to broadcast Palais-De-Sport events and sports games. The second floor was used as an art gallery, with the OTE-ordered electronic music piece "Communications 1970" composed by Theodore Antoniou accompanying a painting exhibition.

==== 2005 renovation-today ====
In 2000, the original 1969 TIF-OTE leasing contract was expired and TIF regained full ownership of the tower and its facilities. However, TIF re-leased the tower to OTE with a new contract which specified stricter leasing terms and was set to last until 2024. Following this new development it was deemed necessary to proceed with a full tower-wide renovation and modernisation project. The renovation study was completed in 2003 and work was completed in 2005. The rotation mechanism on the observatory floor was upgraded to modern standards, and the top floor was re-opened to the public year-round as the seat of the SKYLINE luxury cafe-bar. The broadcasting towers for the Cosmote cellular network were mounted on the main antenna mast and a new lift system was designed, effectively restricting visitor access to the deteriorated mechanical levels, the abandoned second floor art gallery and the first and fifth floor radio-television stations which are now only accessible by the old entrance gate. The tower remains one of the most recognizable landmarks of the Thessaloniki skyline and has been featured in a number of promotional campaigns such as the 2018 Coca-Cola Thessaloniki collectable bottle and poster combo as well as foreign films set in Thessaloniki such as the 2022 production of The Bricklayer.

=== Ownership ===
The OTE tower is owned by TIF-HELEXPO, the company managing the Thessaloniki International Fair, and leased to OTE based on the 24 year long expansion of the original 30-year long 1969 leasing agreement. While the original contract specified that OTE could use the tower rent-free, the 1999-2024 expansion specified an undisclosed price for the ongoing leasing of the tower.

== Architecture and design ==
The OTE tower is a mix of modernist and futuristic architectures. It is designed around a main spire containing the elevators and emergency staircase. Surrounding this structure are several large discs of varying diameter which include the tower's usable spaces:

- The first floor: a small cylindrical chamber used in the past as an office and conference room
- The second floor: a two story high cylindrical structure with the emergency staircase looping around its edges, used in the past as an art gallery
- The third floor: cylindrical chamber used as a recording studio
- The fourth floor: main observatory level, houses the Skyline revolving restaurant
- The fifth floor: a small barrel shaped space, used in the past as a live broadcasting station

In between the floors are small balconies which provide fire escape routes for the emergency staircase. These are only accessible from the main entrance (off limits for the public since the 2005 renovation), except for the one between the third and fourth floors which is also accessible through the Skyline restaurant.

== Gallery ==
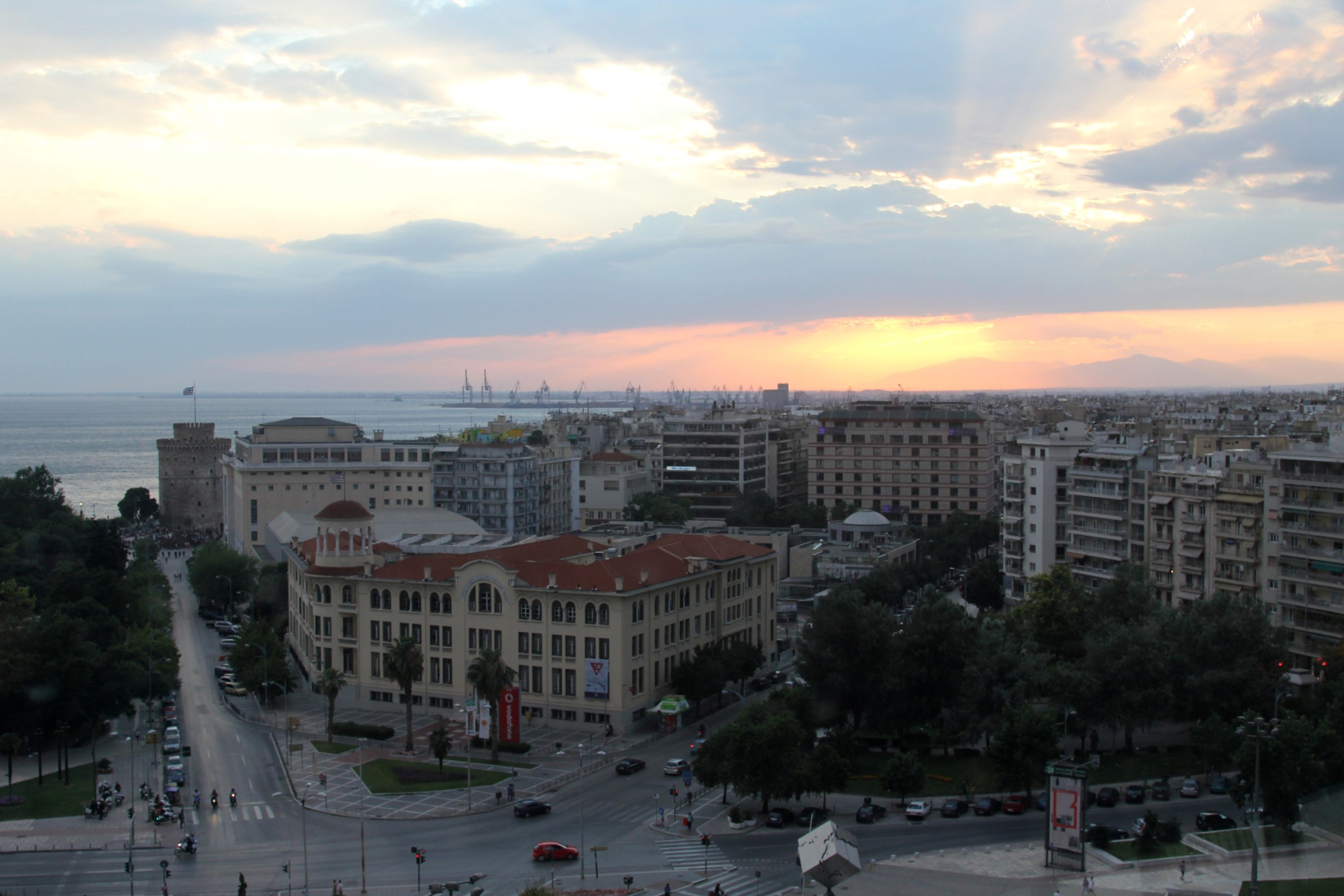
View from the tower

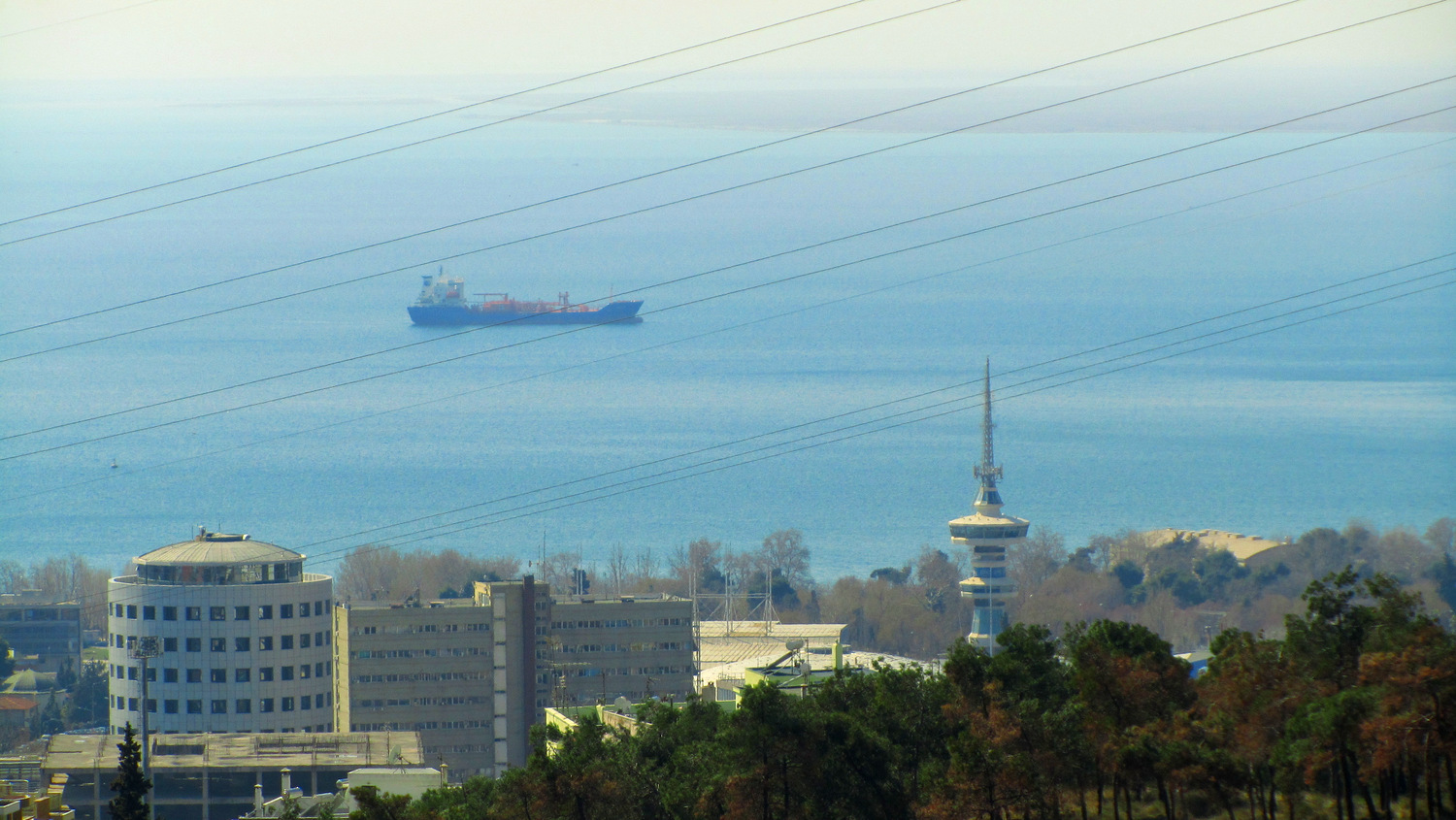
The tower as seen from far away

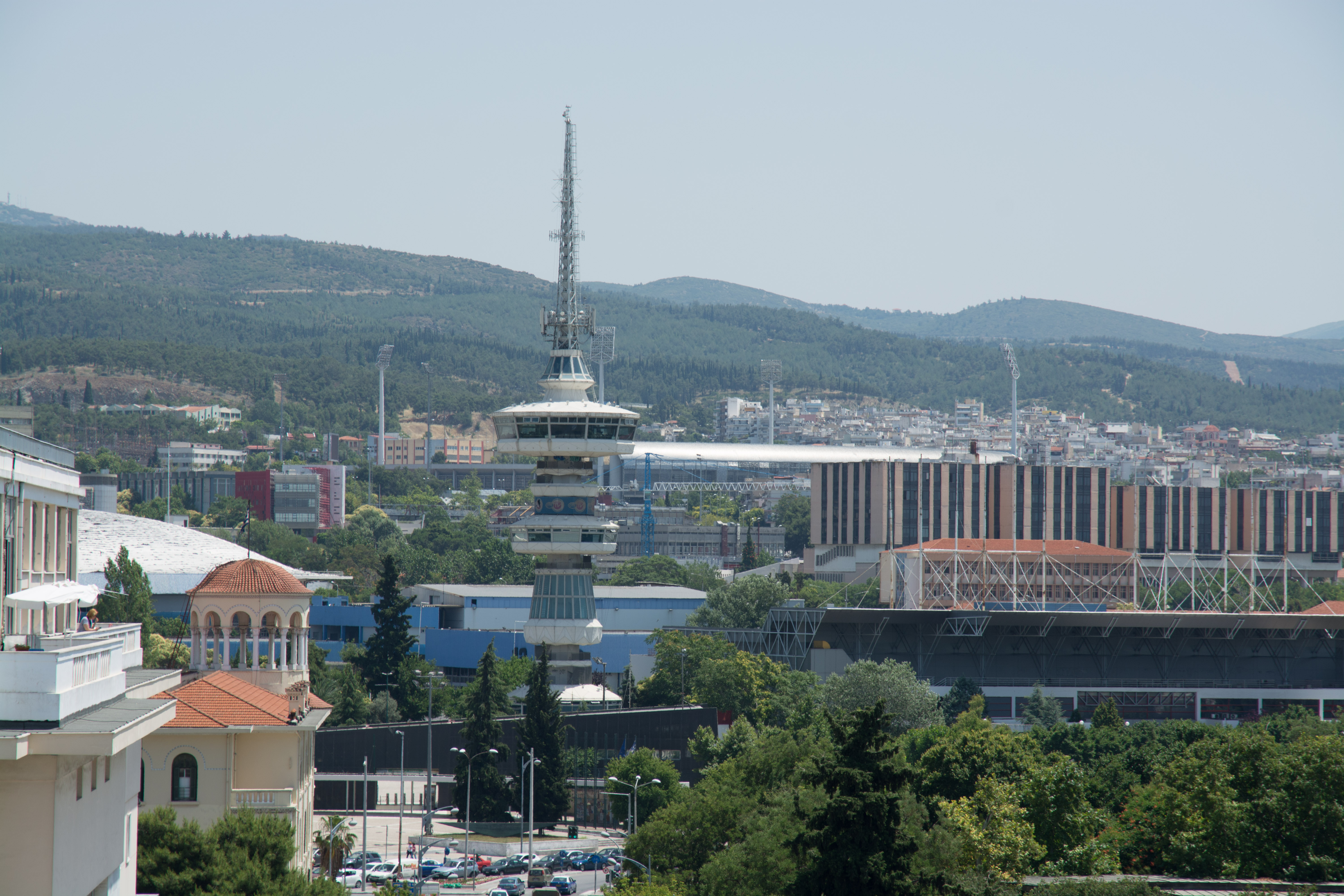
The OTE Tower as seen from the White Tower
