= Prima Tower Revolving Restaurant =

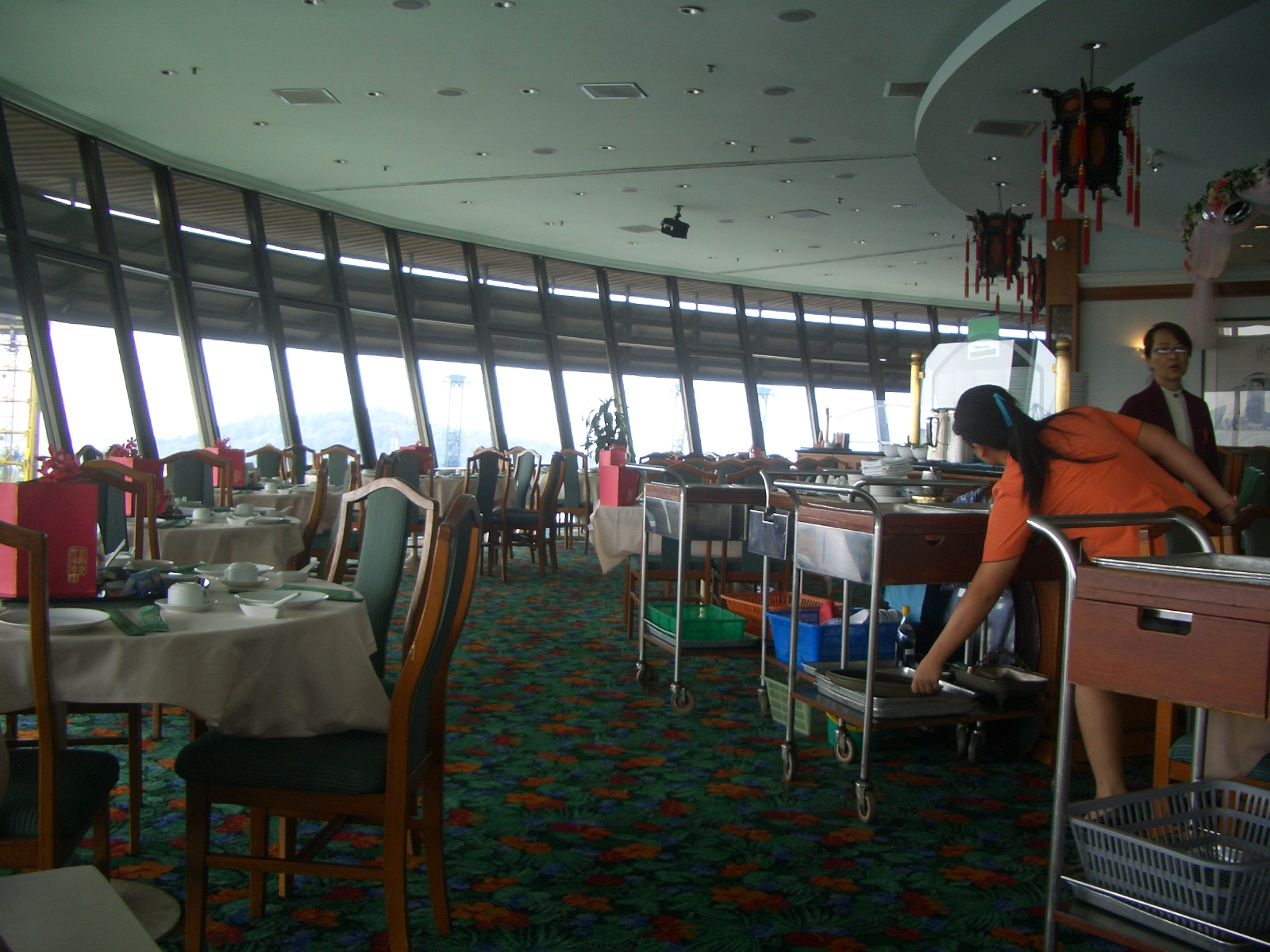
- Interactive map of Prima Tower Revolving Restaurant

Restaurant information
- Established: 1977; 49 years ago
- Closed: 6 April 2020; 6 years ago
- Head chef: Chan Sung Og
- Food type: Chinese
- Location: 201 Keppel Road, 099419, Singapore
- Coordinates: 1°15′55.4″N 103°49′33.6″E
- Seating capacity: 400

Prima Tower Revolving Restaurant was a Chinese restaurant in Singapore owned and managed by Prima Tower Pte Ltd.

The restaurant opened in 1977, and was touted for being the "world’s only revolving restaurant nestled on a grain silo". This was however not true as on the top of the silo of Henninger brewery, the such called Henninger Turm, there were two revolving restaurants on the top. It served Beijing cuisine and offered views of Sentosa, Mount Faber and the Cable Car.

== History ==
The restaurant was built on top of a grain silo.

It was popular as a wedding venue for Chinese couples, offering wedding banquets and packages

== Closure ==
On 6 April 2020, the restaurant closed due to the "circuit breaker" measures implemented by Singapore. Although scheduled to open on 1 August, it was closed permanently, after 43 years in operation.

Jian Yongyao, chairman of the restaurant, stated that it was a difficult decision to close the restaurant and "It's a shame that a 43-year-old business has come to this". Despite the closure of the restaurant the building remains standing as of 2026, with the former carpark now being used as a storage park for shipping containers.

== See also ==
- Henninger Turm
