= Koryo Hotel =

Hotel in Pyongyang, North Korea

Coordinates: 39°0′31.47″N 125°44′9.92″E

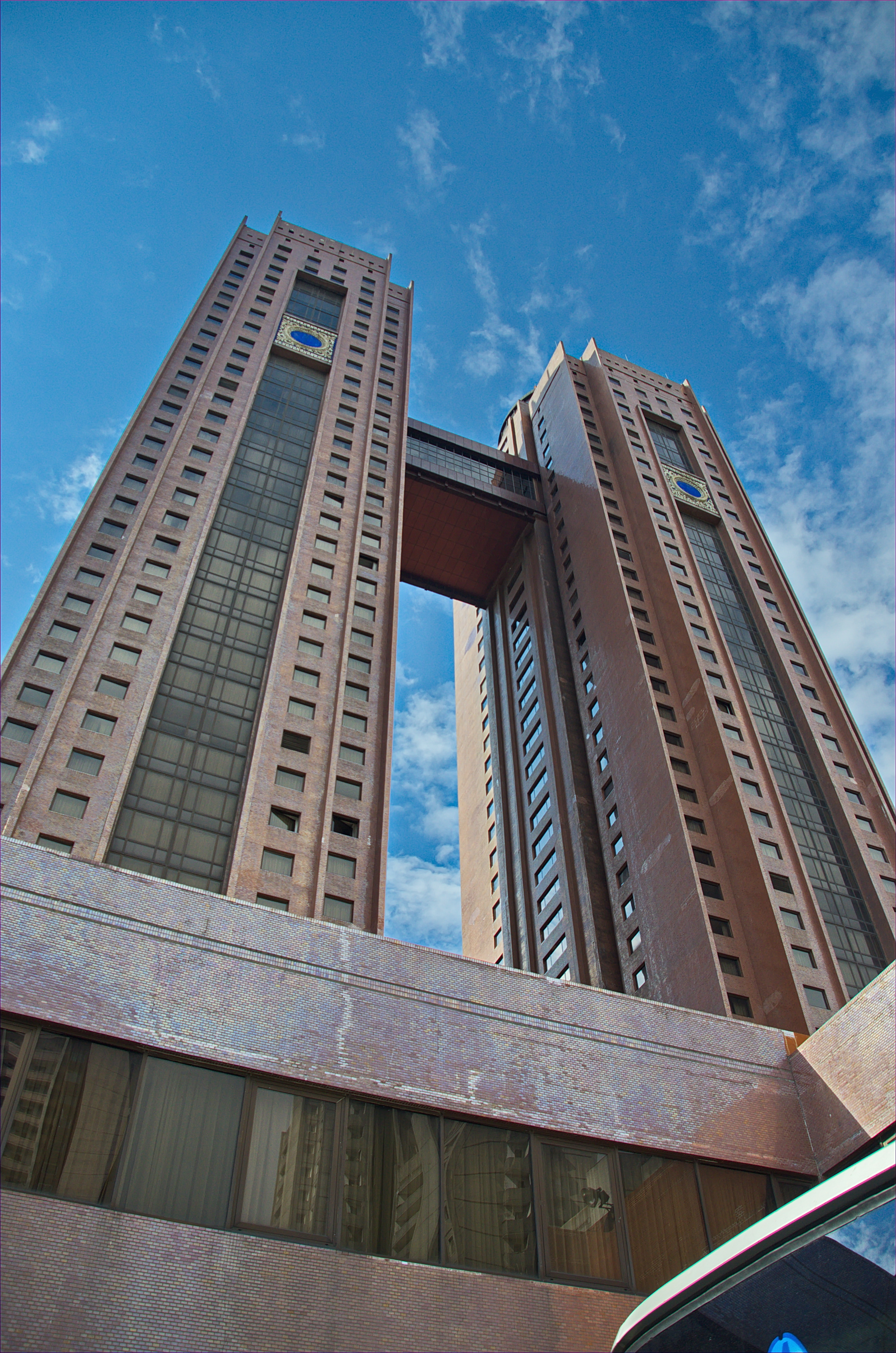

Korean name
- Hangul: 고려호텔
- Hanja: 高麗호텔
- RR: Goryeo hotel
- MR: Koryŏ hot'el

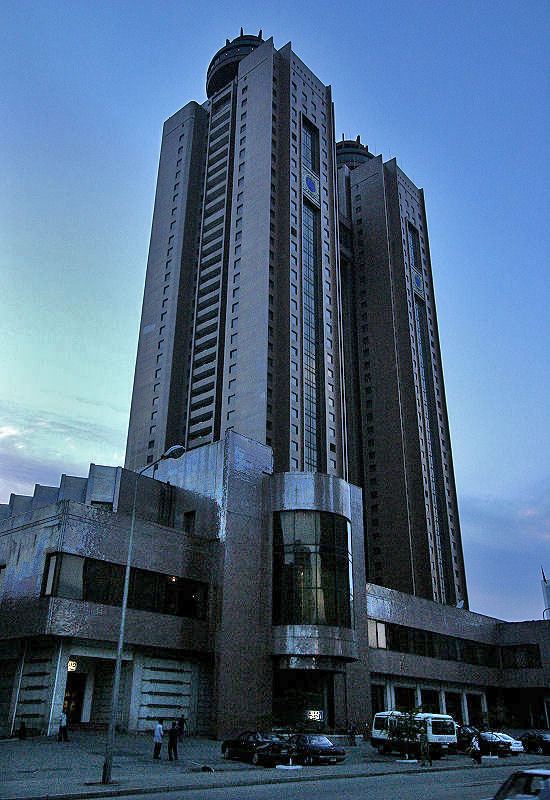
Entrance to the hotel

The Koryo Hotel (or Pyongyang Koryo Hotel) is the second largest operating hotel in North Korea, the largest being the Yanggakdo Hotel. The Ryugyong Hotel is larger than both, but is not yet operating. The twin-towered Koryo Hotel building is 143 metres (469 ft) tall and contains 43 stories. Erected in 1985 under Kim Il Sung, it was intended to "showcase the glory and strength of the DPRK."

The hotel is rated five stars by North Korea. A section of the hotel reportedly caught fire on 11 June 2015 due to undisclosed circumstances, leaving the bridge between the two buildings badly damaged.

== Name ==
"Koryo" is the name of an early kingdom which is the source of the English name "Korea". It is also used in the name of the North Korean airline, Air Koryo.

The Koryo Hotel replaced an older hotel of the same name, but in a different location. For a time after 1946, the leader of North Korea's Democratic Party Cho Man-sik was kept under house arrest in the older Koryo Hotel.

== Location ==
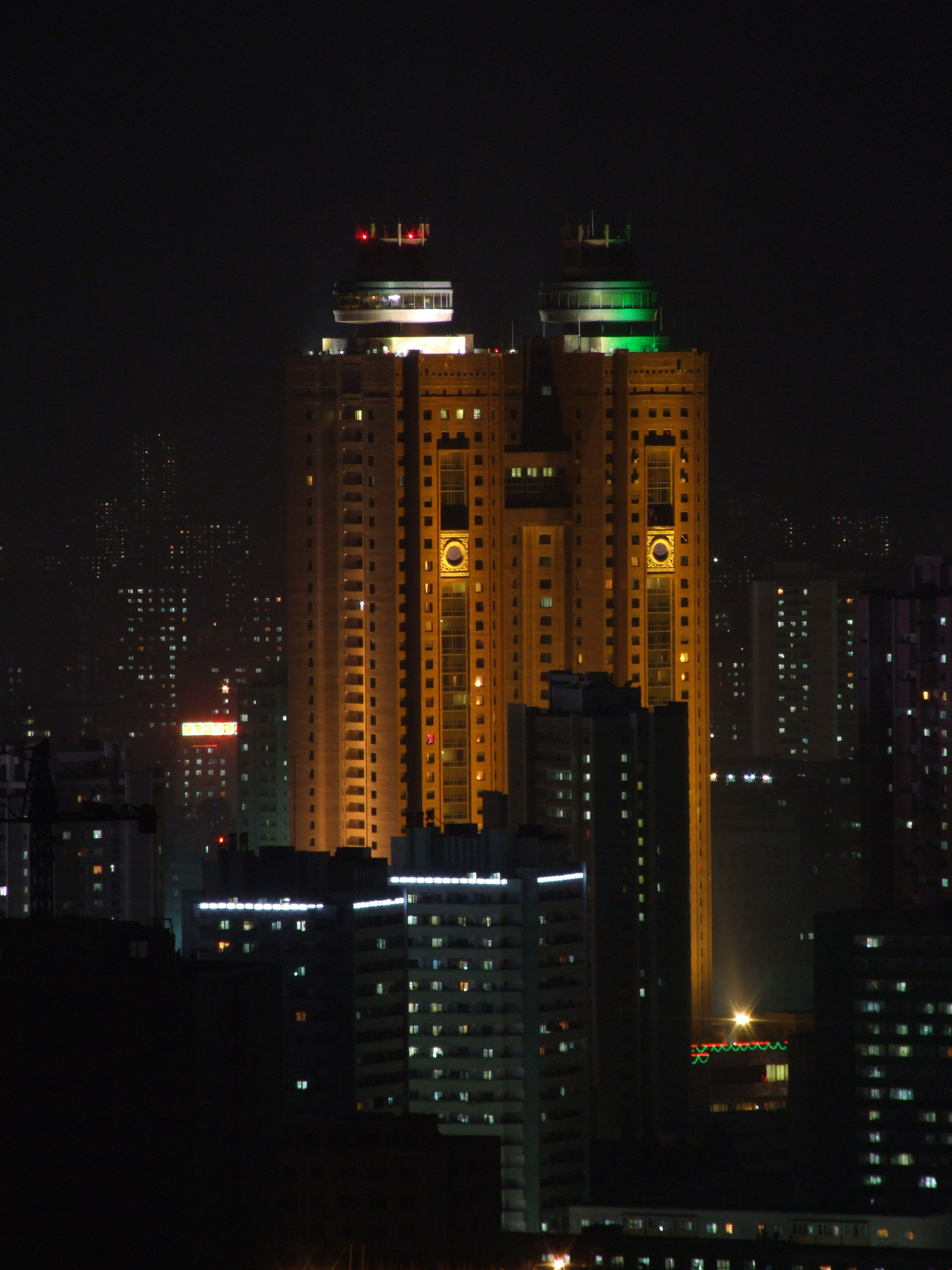
Koryo Hotel at night

The hotel is situated close to Pyongyang Station in Chung-guyok, central Pyongyang.

== Features ==
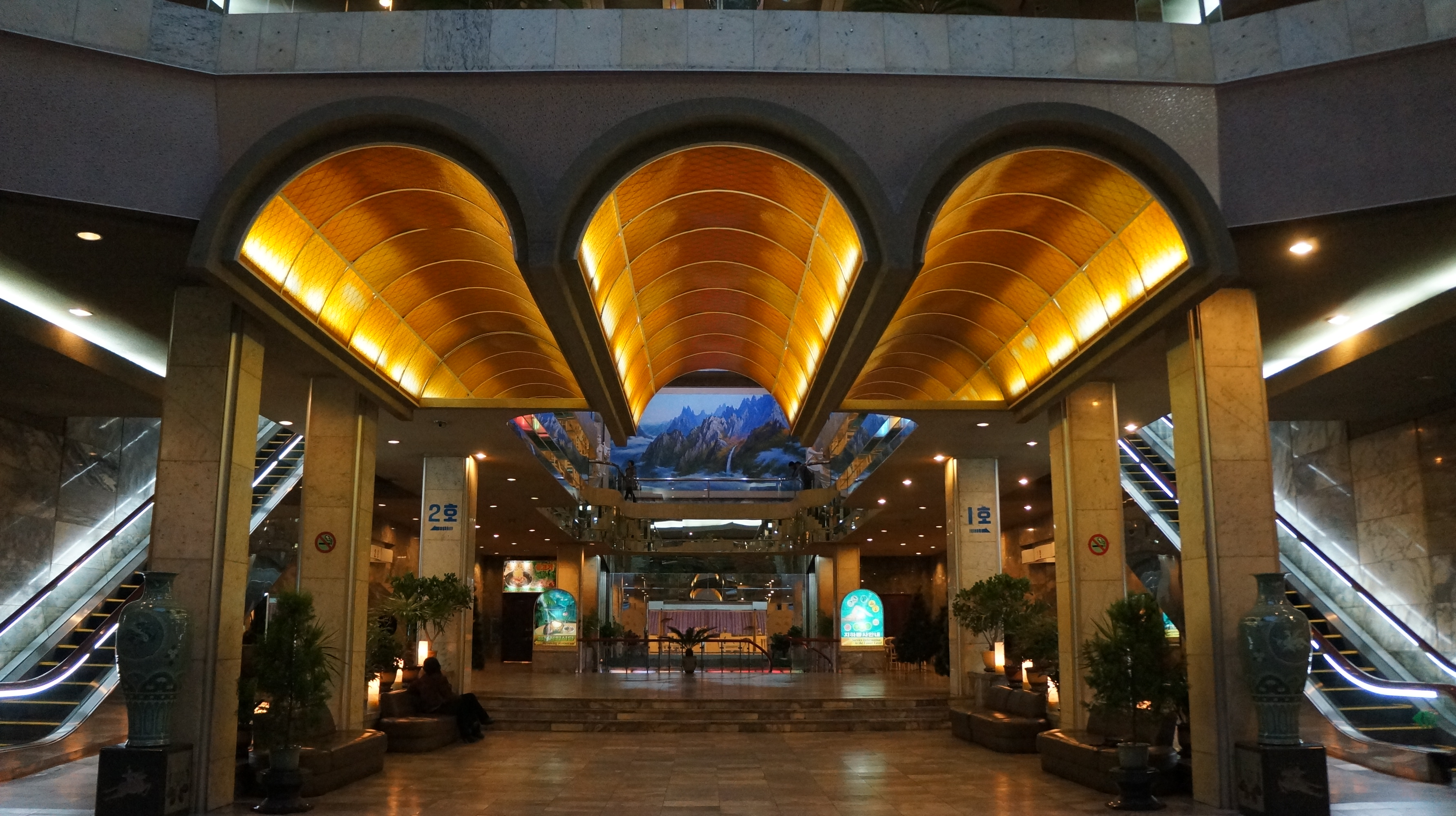
The hotel lobby

The hotel's extravagance is exemplified by its entryway, which consists of a 9-metre (30 ft) wide jade dragon's mouth that leads into an expansive lobby dominated by a mosaic of North Korean cultural symbols. The mosaic tiles make use of a wide variety of precious metals and gemstones underneath low-dispersion glass panes, which are replaced biannually to preserve the mosaic's luster.

The hotel has 500 rooms. Rooms are equipped with a mini-bar and TV. Guests have reported power outages within the hotel grounds.

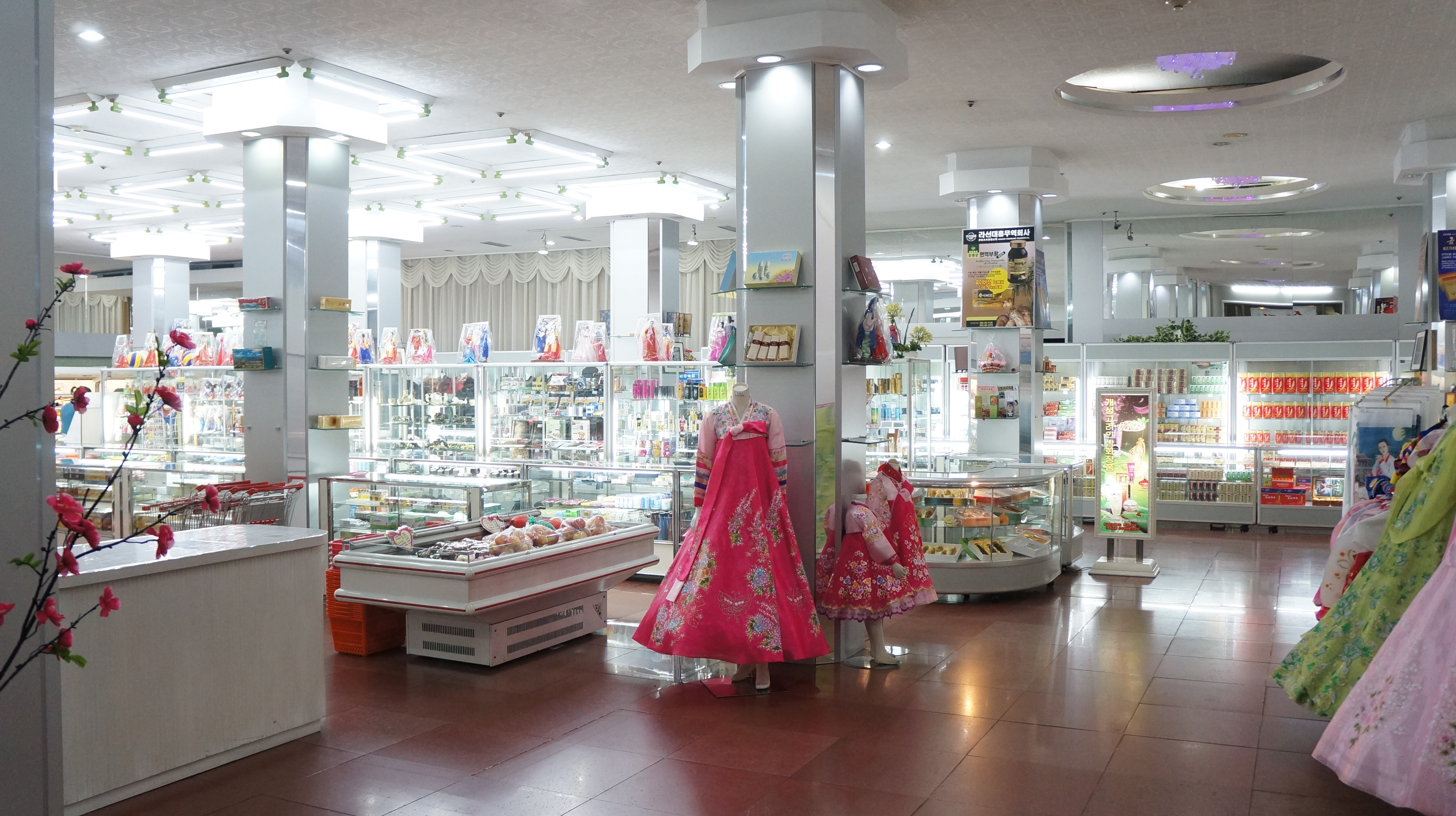
Hotel gift shop

Amenities include a hard currency gift shop, gym, a swimming pool, a revolving restaurant on the 45th floor, a circular bar on the 44th floor and two cinemas; one with 200 seats and one with 70 seats. There is a coffee shop on the ground floor. The hotel also features a billiards room on the second floor and a casino in the basement. The casino offers blackjack, roulette, and slot machines. The casino is staffed by Chinese workers. Amenities do not include the use of the internet.

=== Restaurants ===
Each tower is topped by a revolving restaurant, however only one is open. The revolving restaurant apparently had a 9 pm closing time but in 2010 it was reported that in recent years the closing time would be extended or relaxed based on the quality of the guests' tipping. Aside from the single open revolving restaurant, the hotel has four other restaurants including a Japanese restaurant and a Korean BBQ restaurant.

The restaurants are operated by Japanese expatriates and are run as private businesses, but they must pay a fee to the state.

== Guest liberty ==
By some reports, guests are prevented by guards from leaving the hotel. However, others report the ability to wander off the hotel grounds. The hotel is a few blocks from the city's restaurant district and the Pyongyang Railroad Station.

== See also ==
- List of hotels in North Korea
- Tourism in North Korea
- Transport in North Korea
