= Revolving restaurant =

Eating space atop a rotating platform

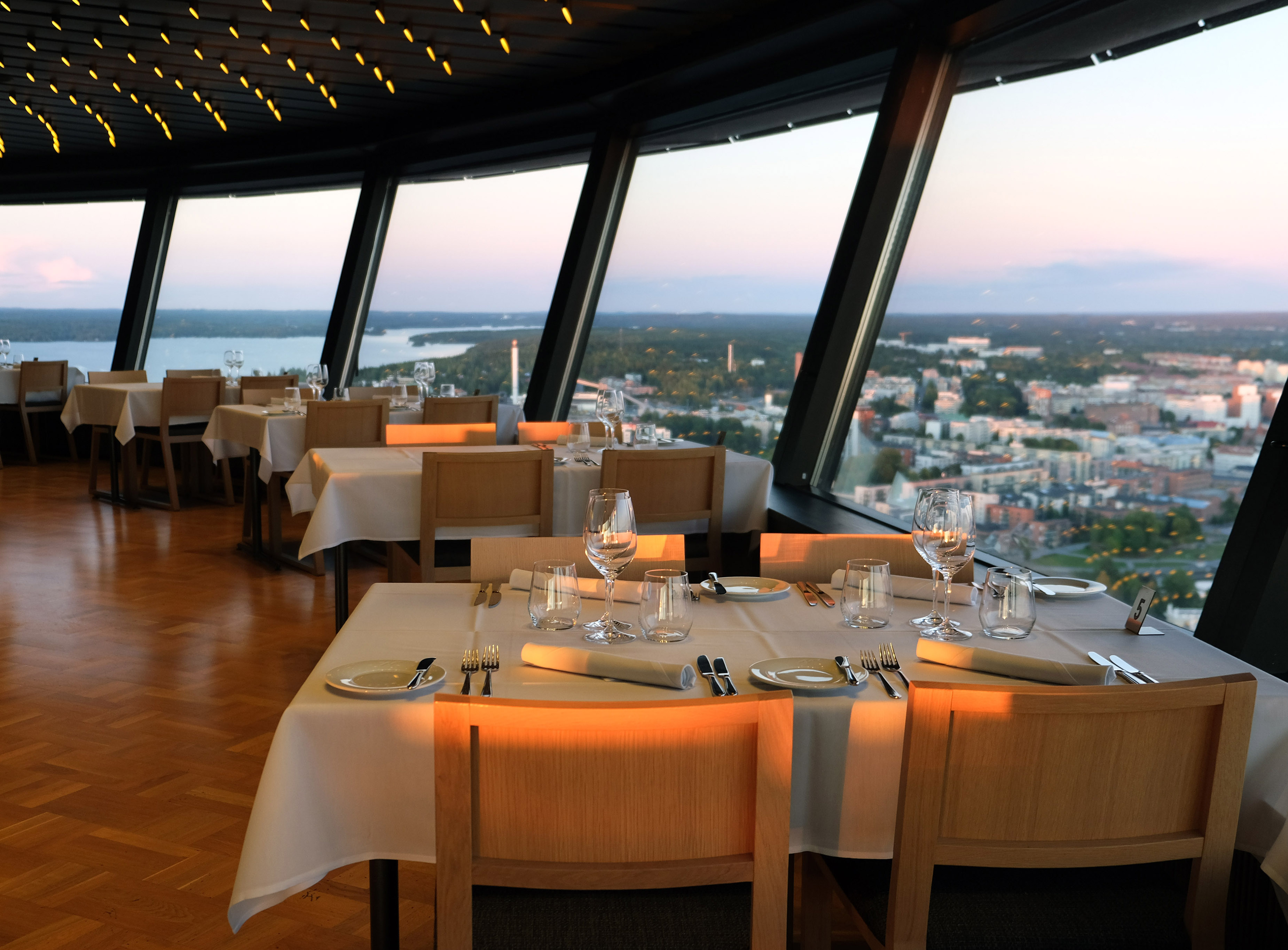
A revolving restaurant in the Näsinneula tower in Tampere, Finland

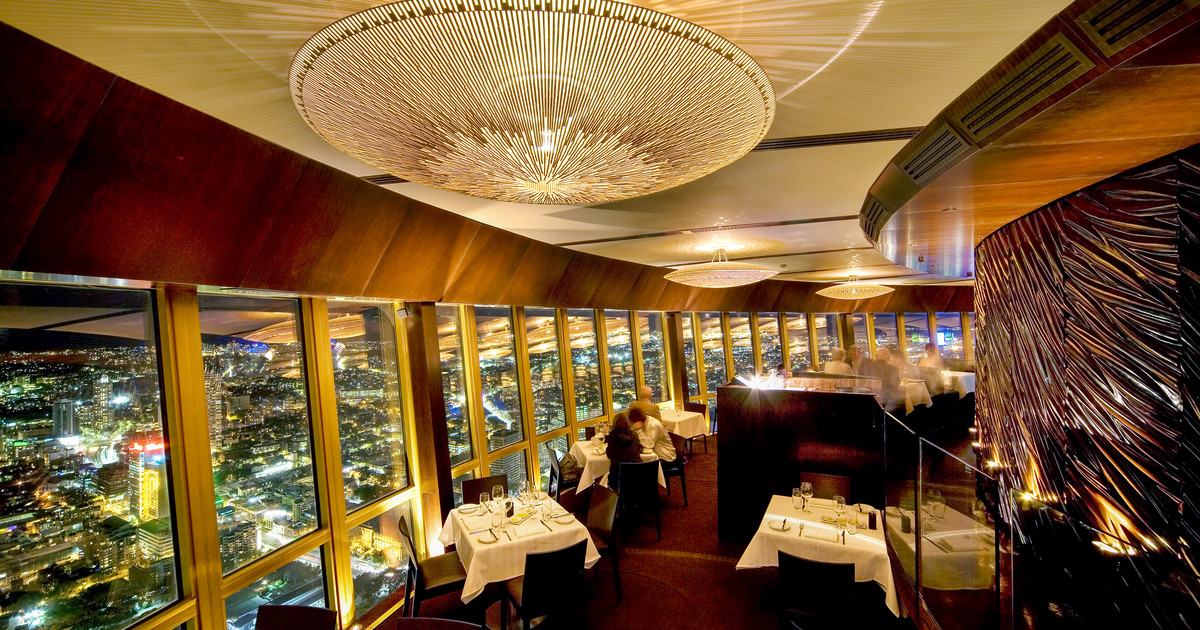
Sydney Tower's revolving restaurant, Australia

A revolving restaurant or rotating restaurant is a tower restaurant designed to rest atop a broad circular revolving platform that operates as a large turntable. The building remains stationary and the diners are carried on the revolving floor. Such restaurants are often located on upper stories of hotels, communication towers, and skyscrapers.

== Design and construction ==
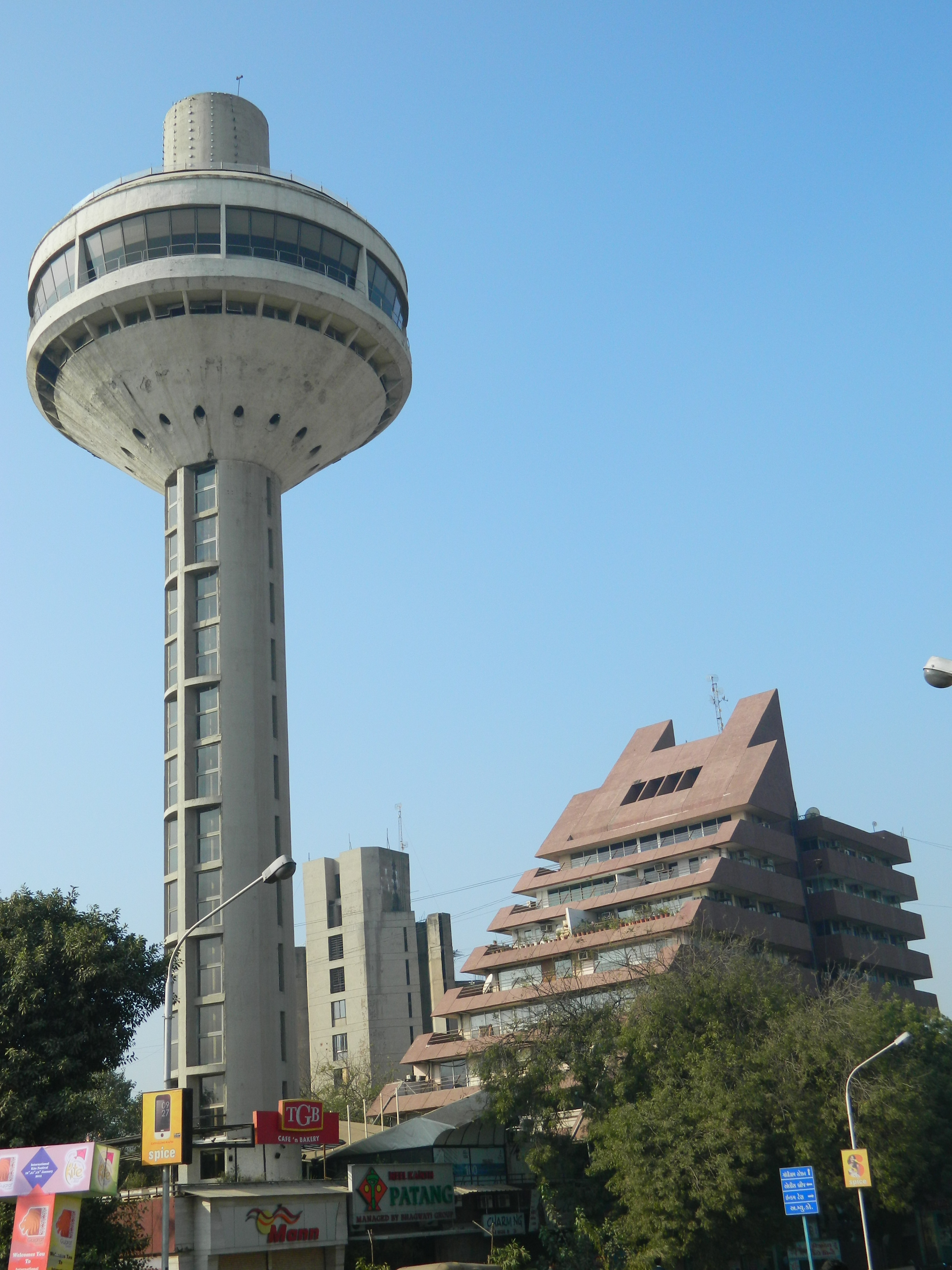
The exterior of the Patang Hotel in Ahmedabad, India with a revolving restaurant at the top

Revolving restaurants are designed as a circular structure, with a platform that rotates around a core in the center. The center core contains the building's elevators, kitchens, or other features. The restaurant itself rests on a thin steel platform, with the platform sitting on top of a series of wheels connected to the floor of the structure. Alternatively, some designs, like one in Memphis, Tennessee, have the platform mounted on tires. A motor rotates the restaurant at less than one horsepower. The speed of rotation is noted to vary, depending on preference.

== History ==
It is believed that Emperor Nero had a rotating dining room in his palace Domus Aurea on the Palatine Hill with a view of the Forum Romanum and Colosseum. Archaeologists unearthed what they believed to be evidence of such a dining room in 2009. Architect and designer Norman Bel Geddes proposed a rotating restaurant for the Century of Progress, the 1933 World's Fair in Chicago, although it was not built.

During the first half of the 20th century, several rotating bars were built in hotels and nightclubs, such as the Chez Ami Supper Club, which opened in Buffalo, New York in 1934. After World War II, dining was integrated into the concept, and in cities across the world revolving restaurants were built at a great pace. They were viewed as symbols of "modernity and progress". A barrel-shaped, but stationary, restaurant on Fernsehturm Stuttgart, a TV tower in Stuttgart, Germany, built in 1956, is credited as the inspiration for the idea of a revolving restaurant. A revolving restaurant on Florianturm, a TV tower in Dortmund, Germany, was brought into service in 1959. The Egyptian architect Naoum Shebib designed the Cairo Tower with a revolving restaurant at its top, which opened in April 1961. The revolving restaurant on the top floor of the OTE Tower was part of the 34th Thessaloniki International Fair in 1965. The revolving restaurant was then closed, but has been in continued service since 1969.

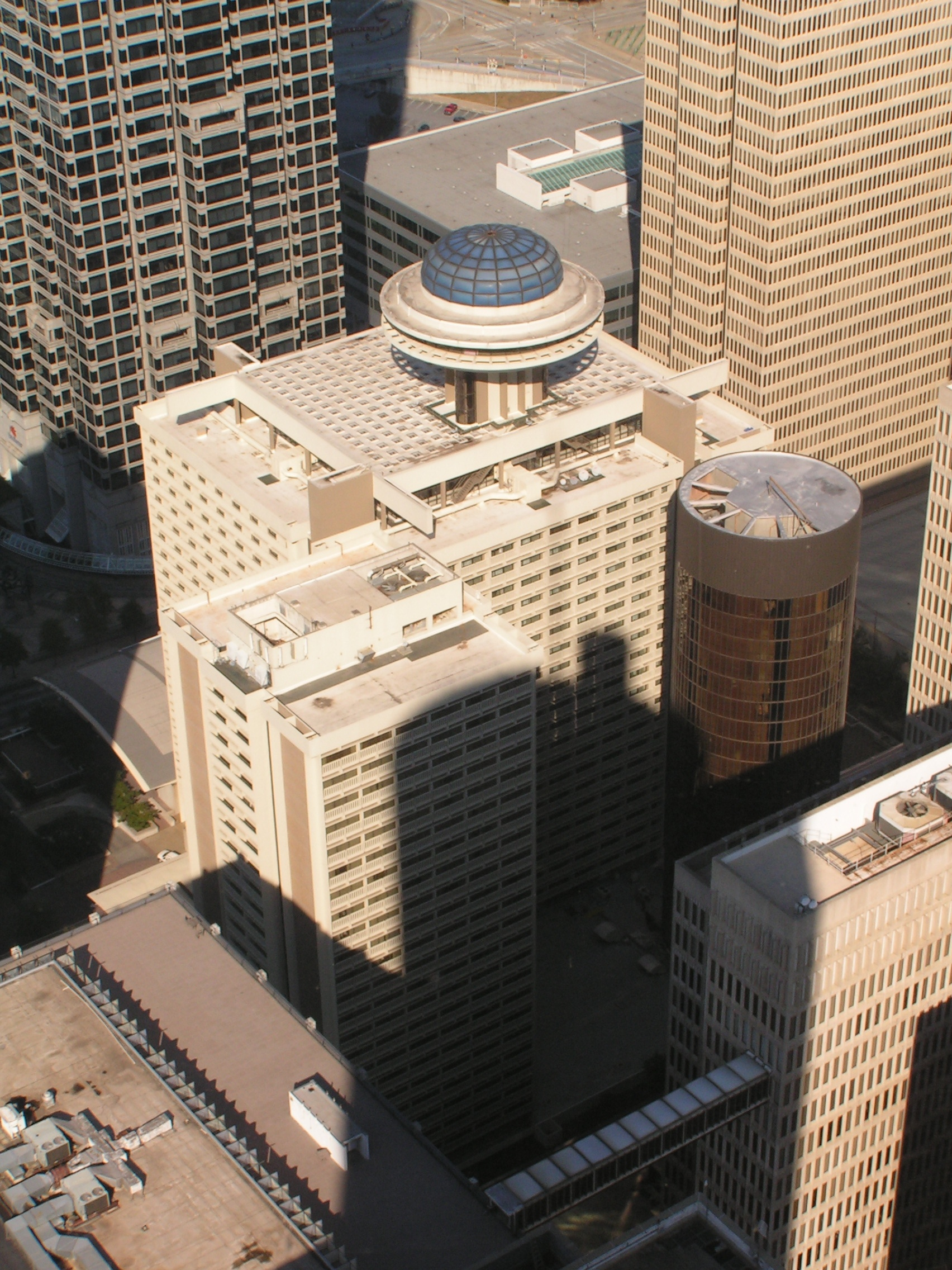
The Hyatt Polaris revolving restaurant in Atlanta, Georgia in 2007

John Graham, a Seattle architect and early shopping mall pioneer, is said to be the first in the United States to design a revolving restaurant, at La Ronde, atop an office building at the Ala Moana Center in Honolulu. The revolving restaurant was opened to the public in 1961, but La Ronde was closed in the 1990s after a mechanical failure. Graham was awarded a US patent for the invention in 1964 and incorporated the mechanics into the New York Marriott Marquis and Hyatt Regency Atlanta.

Revolving restaurants and the prices of their dishes have been subject to ridicule.

== Safety ==
One death has been attributed to the operation of a rotating restaurant. On 14 April 2017, a five-year-old boy's skull was crushed between the rotating part of the restaurant and a stationary wall at the Westin Peachtree Plaza Hotel in Atlanta, Georgia, United States, dying in hospital later that day. A lawsuit filed against the restaurant by the child's parents was settled out of court.

== See also ==
- Floating restaurant
- Googie architecture
- List of revolving restaurants
