= 15th Republican People's Party Extraordinary Convention =

- Saturday, 18 December 2010
- 14th (2008) ← → 16th (2012)

Convention leaders
	Kemal Kılıçdaroğlu	Party leader Genel Başkan
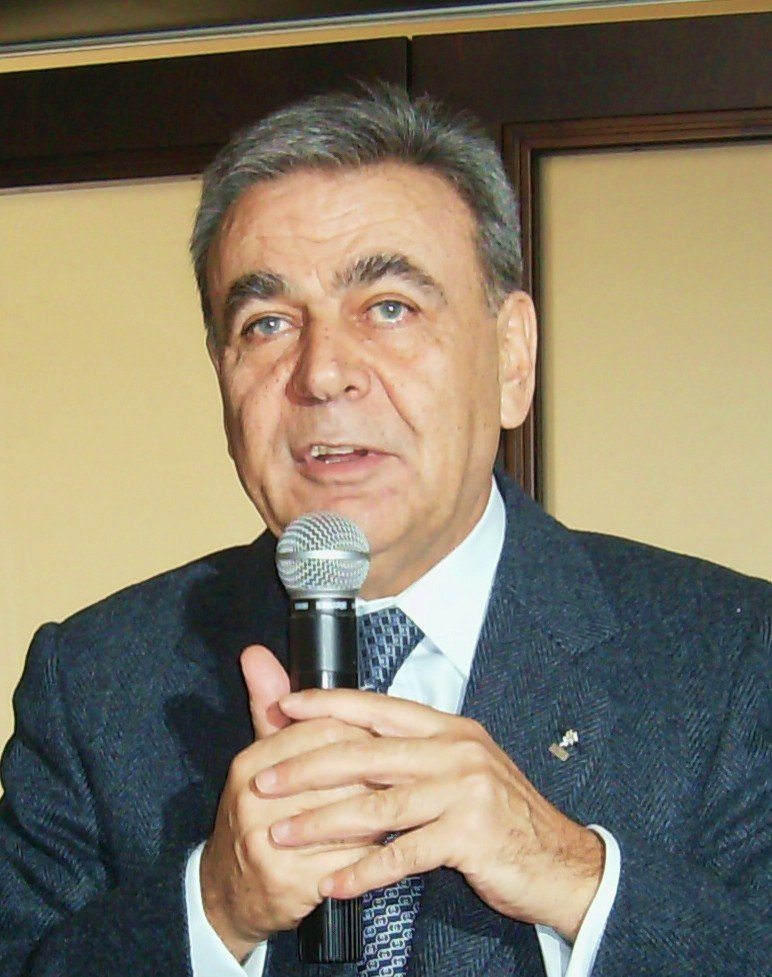
	Aziz Kocaoğlu	Speaker; Divan Başkanı

Delegates
Delegates voting	1,200
Registered delegates	1,242
Turnout	96.6%

Elected positions
- Office: Elected
Party Council	80

Conventions of the Republican People's Party

The 15th Extraordinary Convention of the Republican People's Party was held on 18 December 2010 to elect all 80 members of the Party Council of the Republican People's Party (CHP) of Turkey. It was the first Extraordinary Convention held by party leader Kemal Kılıçdaroğlu, who was elected as the party's leader in May 2010.

The vote was seen as a broad endorsement of Kılıçdaroğlu, who was half a year into his leadership. Most elected members of the Party Council were part of Kılıçdaroğlu's list of candidates. However, the election was also a setback for Deputy Leader Gürsel Tekin, who received 762 votes and thus failed to make it into the Party Council. It was rumoured that Tekin had phoned Kılıçdaroğlu at 03:00 in the morning before the convention. Left-wing actor Levent Kırca was also present at the convention.

== Party council ==
=== Directly elected (68 members) ===
Members elected to the Party Council directly, along with the votes they received, are as follows.

- Yaşar Ağyüz: 1101
- Yakup Akkaya: 1110
- Engin Altay: 1108
- Ali Arslan: 1107
- Sencer Ayata: 1084
- Enver Aysever: 1038
- Süheyl Batum: 1089
- Gülsün Bilgehan: 1099
- Mehmet Volkan Canalioğlu: 1106
- Osman Coşkunoğlu: 1106
- Muhammed Çakmak: 1105
- İzzet Çetin: 1092
- Doğa Çiğdemoğlu: 1109
- Mesut Değer: 1062
- Turgut Dibek: 1103
- Zeki Durmaz: 1107
- Atilla Emek: 1104
- Didem Engin: 1095
- Aykan Erdemir: 1107
- Haluk Eyidoğan: 1110
- Levent Eyipişiren: 1107
- İsa Gök: 1067
- Gökhan Günaydın: 1108
- Mehmet Zeki Gündüz: 1100
- Hurşit Güneş: 1080
- Emrehan Halıcı: 1103
- Turhan İçli: 1110
- Sena Kaleli: 1107
- Osman Kaptan: 1104
- Atilla Kart: 1098
- Ayten Kayalıoğlu: 1109
- Sema Kendirci: 1102
- Osman Korutürk: 1107
- Ali İhsan Köktürk: 1102
- Bülent Kuşoğlu: 1104
- Faruk Loğoğlu: 1106
- Aylin Nazlıaka: 1100
- Bertil Emrah Oder: 1109
- Ekrem Kerem Oktay: 1097
- Gülseren Onanç: 1107
- Melda Onur: 1100
- Umut Oran: 1080
- Oğuz Oyan: 1104
- Ensar Öğüt: 1090
- Veli Özdemir: 1109
- Ramazan Kerim Özkan: 1106
- İhsan Özkes: 1109
- Mehmet Ali Özpolat: 1088
- Faik Öztrak: 1109
- Ali Arif Özzeybek: 1109
- Hüseyin Pazarcı: 1104
- Zühal Samlı: 1098
- Perihan Sarı: 1108
- Atilla Sav: 1098
- Vahap Seçer: 1105
- Mehmet Ali Susam: 1099
- Bihlun Tamaylıgil: 1110
- Mahmut Tanal: 1110
- Sezgin Tanrıkulu: 1030
- Binnaz Toprak: 1106
- Erdoğan Toprak: 1103
- Faik Tunay: 1105
- Rıza Yalçınkaya: 1104
- Hüseyin Yaşar: 1101
- İrfan Hüseyin Yıldız: 1100
- Ayşe Ataç Yılmaz: 1102
- Alaaddin Yüksel: 1071

=== Culture, Science and Executive Quota (12 members) ===
Members elected to the Party Council through the Culture, Science and Executive Quota, along with the votes they received, are as follows.

- Önay Alpago: 663
- Mevlüt Aslanoğlu: 866
- Ufuk Ataç: 762
- Deniz Pınar Atılgan: 692
- Seyhan Erdoğdu: 726
- Birgül Ayman Güler: 832
- Hülya Güven: 654
- Ercan Karakaş: 824
- Ömer Kurtaş: 655
- Nihat Matkap: 794
- Nur Serter: 736
- Sacid Yıldız: 673
