= International Panel of Parliamentarians for Freedom of Religion or Belief =

The International Panel of Parliamentarians for Freedom of Religion or Belief (IPPFoRB) is a network of parliamentarians from around the world committed to combating religious persecution and advancing freedom of religion or belief, as defined by Article 18 of the Universal Declaration of Human Rights.

== History ==
IPPFoRB was established on 8 November 2014 with the signing of the Oslo Charter for Freedom of Religion or Belief at the Nobel Peace Center in Oslo. The event was attended by Katrina Lantos Swett, Chairwoman of the US Commission on International Religious Freedom, who declared, “This historic event brought together individual parliamentarians from a wide range of nations and religious communities in a united effort to galvanise support at a time when religious freedom increasingly is under attack”. All world religions are included in the Charter.

The first steering committee of the IPPFoRB was composed of Baroness Elizabeth Berridge (UK House of Lords), David Anderson (House of Commons of Canada), Abid Raja (Parliament of Norway), Aykan Erdemir (Grand National Assembly of Turkey), Leonardo Quintao (National Congress of Brazil).

== Activities ==
In September 2015, IPPFoRB convened 100 parliamentarians from 50 countries in New York, alongside the United Nations General Assembly, and issued the New York Resolution for Freedom of Religion or Belief to "enhance global cooperation by working across geographical, political, and religious lines." At the New York meeting, IPPFoRB founder Aykan Erdemir stated that this global network is "idea for which the time is right," adding that people advocating rights should be as "outspoken, organised and transnational" as the violent extremists.

In September 2016, IPPFoRB assembled 100 parliamentarians from 60 countries in Berlin with the attendance of German Chancellor Angela Merkel who declared, “Although some religiously motivated behaviour may seem strange, we must always keep the high value of religious freedom in mind”.

Since its inception, IPPFoRB parliamentarians have written advocacy letters to heads of state of Burma, Eritrea, Indonesia, Iran, North Korea, Pakistan, Sudan, and Vietnam, as reported by Jackie Wolcott and Sandra Jolley, commissioners at the U.S. Commission on International Religious Freedom (USCIRF).

IPPFoRB steering committee members have received awards in recognition of their efforts: Aykan Erdemir was awarded the Stefanus Prize by the Stefanus Alliance International in 2015 while Baroness Elizabeth Berridge is the recipient of the 2017 International Religious Liberty Award of the International Center for Law and Religion Studies and Abid Raja was named the 2018 recipient of the International Religious Liberty Association's International Award for Outstanding Leadership in Religious Freedom Advocacy.
