= Stefanus Alliance International =

Stefanus Alliance International (SAI) is a Norwegian mission and human rights organization, dedicated to defending freedom of belief and religion as expressed in Article 18 of the Universal Declaration of Human Rights. The organization is based in Oslo, Norway. Its motto, designated in 1996, is: "Together for the persecuted."

== History ==
Stefanus Alliance International was established in 1967 by Monrad Norderval, Anutza Moise, Vemund Skard, Else-Marie Skard and Gulbrand Øverbye. It was earlier known as the Mission Behind the Iron Curtain, or the Norwegian Mission to the East. The organization decided at its meeting of October 29, 2011, to change its name to Stefanus Alliance International as of January 1, 2012.

== Activities ==
Stefanus Alliance International provides support, care, and practical help for churches and individuals who are persecuted or oppressed because of their religious beliefs. The organization also advocates on behalf of Christians and others who have had their religious rights violated. It commissioned a radio station in 1968, published the newspaper Ropet fra Øst in 1971 (name changed to Magasinet Stefanus in 2012), and helped establish the Forum 18 news service in 2003.

The NGO is a partner in the international Christian Solidarity Worldwide network since 2001.

Stefanus Alliance International awards every second year the Stefanus Prize, a human rights prize, to individuals who have made an outstanding contribution to the work for freedom of religion or belief as defined by the Article 18 of the Universal Declaration of Human Rights. Despite having historical roots as a Christian missions organization, Stefanus Alliance International in awarding the Stefanus Prize has recognized the efforts of individuals across different faiths.

Recent Stefanus Prize laureates include Asma Jilani Jahangir (Pakistan), Mine Yildirim and Aykan Erdemir (Turkey), Wagma Feroz (Pakistan) and Aiman Umarova (Kazakhstan).

== Leadership ==
On April 3, 2018, Stefanus Alliance International publicized its decision to appoint Ed Brown as the new secretary-general as of August 1, 2018, replacing Hilde Skaar Vollebæk.

Former secretaries-general include Lasse Trædal (1982–1989), John Victor Selle (1989–2002), Bjørn Wegge (2002–2013), Hans Aage Gravaas (2013–2017) and Hilde Skaar Vollebæk (2017–2018).
