= Emek =

Emek may refer to:

- Emek (movie theater), Istanbul, Turkey
- Emek Partisi, Labour Party (Turkey)
- Atila Emek (born 1947), Turkish lawyer and politician
- Fikret Emek (born 1963), Turkish soldier
- Emek Business Center, original name of the Kahramanlar Business Center, Ankara, Turkey
- Emek (designer) (Emek Golan), American designer, illustrator and fine art painter
- Emek, a component of Hebrew placenames literally meaning "valley"
