= Aykan Erdemir =

Turkisk anthropologist (born 1974)

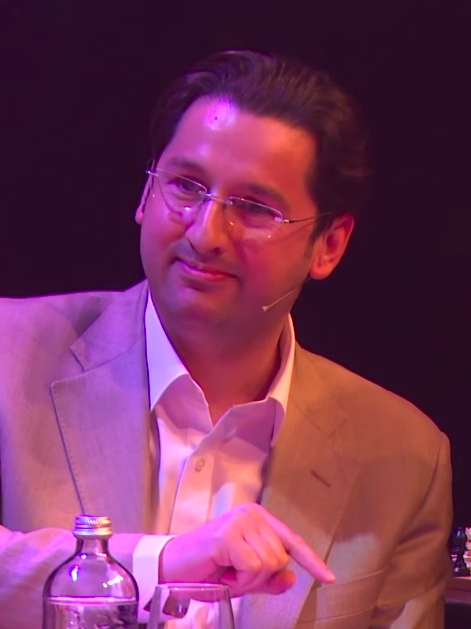
- Erdemir in 2015

Member of the Grand National Assembly of Turkey
- In office 12 June 2011 – 7 June 2015
- Constituency: Bursa (2011)

Personal details
- Born: July 28, 1974 (age 52) Bursa, Turkey
- Party: Republican People's Party
- Spouse: Dr. Tuğba Tanyeri-Erdemir
- Education: Harvard University
- Website: www.aykanerdemir.com

Aykan Erdemir (born July 28, 1974) is an anthropologist, policy analyst, and former Turkish politician. He served in the Grand National Assembly of Turkey between 2011 and 2015 as a representative from the pro-secular Republican People's Party. As an outspoken advocate of freedom of religion or belief, separation of mosque and state, and minority rights in the Middle East and beyond, Erdemir has been a leading voice against radical Islam and violent extremism, and a vocal critic of the persecution of religious minorities in the Middle East.

Erdemir is one of the founders and former steering committee members of the International Panel of Parliamentarians for Freedom of Religion or Belief (IPPFoRB), the first multi-faith and bipartisan global network of parliamentarians committed to combating religious persecution and advancing freedom of religion or belief, as defined by Article 18 of the Universal Declaration of Human Rights. At the initiative's New York summit held along the sidelines of the 70th General Assembly of the United Nations, Erdemir stated that IPPFoRB is an "idea for which the time is right,” adding that people advocating rights should be as “outspoken, organised and transnational” as the violent extremists.

Erdemir currently works as the Director of International Affairs Research at Anti-Defamation League. He earlier served as the Senior Director of the Turkey Program at Foundation for Defense of Democracies, Washington, DC and on the Anti-Defamation League's Task Force on Middle East Minorities.

== Academic career ==
After graduating from Robert College, Istanbul, Erdemir earned his bachelor's degree in International Relations from Bilkent University, Ankara, and his master's degree in Middle East Studies from Harvard University. He received his doctoral degree from Harvard University's Anthropology and Middle East Studies joint program with his dissertation Incorporating Alevis: The Transformation of Governance and Faith-based Collective Action in Turkey. He was a doctoral fellow at John F. Kennedy School of Government's Center for Nonprofit Organizations, and a research associate at the University of Oxford's Centre on Migration, Policy and Society.

Erdemir held teaching positions at Middle East Technical University's Department of Sociology (2004–2011) and Bilkent University's Department of Political Science and Public Administration (2015–2016). Between 2005 and 2010, he served as the Deputy Dean of the Graduate School of Social Science at Middle East Technical University.

== Political career ==
Erdemir entered politics in May 2010 to support the bid of Kemal Kılıçdaroğlu for the leadership of the Republican People's Party. In the 15th Republican People's Party Extraordinary Convention, Erdemir was elected to the 80-seat Party Council. In 12 June 2011 general elections, at the age of 36, he was elected to the Grand National Assembly of Turkey as one of the youngest lawmakers of his cohort. In parliament, he served in Turkey-EU Joint Parliamentary Committee, European Union Harmonization Committee, and the Ad-Hoc Committee on the IT Sector and the Internet, and was the secretary of the Turkey-Sweden Caucus. In addition to representing his constituency of Bursa, Erdemir also served as a volunteer lawmaker for Batman, a city near the Syrian border with predominantly Kurdish and Arab inhabitants.

Erdemir has identified patriarchy and gerontocracy as the leading problems of the Turkish political system, and as part of his attempts to reform the Republican People's Party, he has advocated introducing 50 percent gender quota with alternating female and male candidates as well as youth quota for under-30 candidates.

Erdemir announced his decision to quit active politics in March 2015, stating that he would like to spend more time with his two daughters while also noting that the Turkish Parliament does not accommodate the needs of parents with young children.

=== Legislative work ===
Erdemir's legislative work between 2011 and 2015 was focused on freedom of religion or belief, minority rights, discrimination, hate crimes, and hate speech.

In parliament, Erdemir's first legislative initiative was to file a motion to establish an Ad-Hoc Parliamentary Committee on Hate Crimes. He later encouraged the Turkish government to draft a comprehensive hate crimes law, warning that "the issue cannot be reduced to Islamophobia" and criticized the absence of institutional mechanisms to track and report hate crimes in Turkey. In December 2012, in coordination with the umbrella group Hate Crimes Law Campaign Platform, he drafted a comprehensive hate crimes bill, which was later incorporated into the Turkish government's hate crimes bill of June 2014. Erdemir has criticized the government bill as a deficient law that acknowledges hate crimes, but fails to provide any real protections.

Erdemir has been one of the most outspoken critics of antisemitism in Turkey. In September 2014, at a press conference he held at the Turkish Parliament to mark Rosh Hashanah, citing a recent study by the Anti-Defamation League, he warned that "Turkey tops Iran in antisemitism league." The next month, he filed a motion to set up an Ad-Hoc Parliamentary Committee on Antisemitism to look into discrimination, hate speech, and hate crimes targeting Turkey's Jewish community, a first in the history of the Grand National Assembly of Turkey. In November 2013, at the height of the Turkey-Israel flotilla crisis, Erdemir traveled to Israel to attend a conference at Hebrew University of Jerusalem's Truman Institute for Peace to promote Turkish-Israeli rapprochement, and stated that "politicians can give you many reasons why this can’t happen, but it takes a statesman to build peace.” In an op-ed he later penned for The Times of Israel, he warned that "real rapprochement with Israel requires Turkey to tackle antisemitism."

Erdemir has also been an outspoken defender of Turkey's Christian minorities. In December 2013, through a parliamentary inquiry, he exposed the restrictions imposed by Turkey's Ministry of Culture and Tourism on worship at historical churches. In May 2014, he exposed that the Turkish Parliament had been blocking access to Diyarbakır Protestant Church by classifying it as a "pornographic website." He called the ban "humiliating, embarrassing, and defaming," and succeeded in revoking the ban after raising the issue with the Speaker of the Turkish Parliament Cemil Çiçek, a development he referred to as "a small step for internet freedoms in Turkey, but a big step for internet freedom in the Parliament.” Erdemir later visited the Ahmet Güvener, the pastor of the Diyarbakır Protestant Church, ahead of Sunday service to offer apologies to him and his flock on behalf of the Turkish Parliament. In June 2013, Erdemir prepared a draft bill to lift the ban on Greek language instruction for the Eastern Orthodox Christian minority residing on the islands of Imbros and Tenedos. He also supported Turkey's Armenian community by attending the Easter liturgy at Diyarbakır's St. Giragos Armenia Church and the first baptism in a century at Van's Cathedral of the Holy Cross on the Akdamar Island.

In April 2015, Erdemir prepared a draft bill for the restitution of citizenship to all ethnic and religious minorities and their descendants who have lost their citizenship within the last hundred years, which would restore rights to Turkey's Armenian, Greek, Syriac, and Jewish communities among others.

Although Erdemir is a member of Turkey's Sunni Muslim majority, he has been an outspoken advocate of the rights and freedoms of the country's Alevi community. In February 2015, Erdemir drafted a bill to grant legal status to Alevi worship places, in an attempt to remedy a longstanding grievance of Turkey's Alevis.

== Policy work ==
Between June 2015 and March 2022, Erdemir was a Senior Fellow at Washington, DC–based Foundation for Defense of Democracies, directing the think tank's Turkey Program. As a policy analyst, Erdemir exposes Turkey's descent into authoritarianism and the plight of country's religious minorities. In the aftermath of Turkey's July 15, 2016, abortive coup, Erdemir warned that the coup attempt sparked backlash against Turkey's minorities. He later warned that the Turkish government and pro-government media were scapegoating Christians. He has been at the forefront of the global campaign to free U.S. Pastor Andrew Brunson, held in Turkey over trumped up charges of being a member of an armed terror organizations and plotting coup. He has testified at the U.S. Senate at a hearing held by the United States Commission on International Religious Freedom on the treatment of Pastor Andrew Brunson and other religious minorities in Turkey.

Erdemir's work continues to expose state-sponsored antisemitism in Turkey. He has documented the way in which Turkish Radio and Television Corporation-funded blockbuster Payitaht: Abdülhamid vilified Jews and Christians by distorting historical facts and propagating antisemitic anti-Western conspiracies.

== Controversies ==
When Turkey's Islamist-rooted Justice and Development Party government moved forward to pass a hate crimes bill in 2015, Erdemir, in an interview with pro-secular Cumhuriyet daily reporter Türey Köse, warned that the government's so-called hate crimes bill was going to function as a blasphemy law, failing to provide any legal protection for atheists, agnostics, and LGBTI individuals, and further restricting freedom of expression in Turkey. Islamist and far-right daily Yeni Akit journalist Talha Çolak claimed that in his Cumhuriyet interview, Erdemir had advocated that “it should not be illegal to curse at religion,” triggering widespread insults and death threats. Such a comment does not appear in the original interview, and was fabricated by the Yeni Akit reporter. Erdemir later penned an op-ed stating that he is not angry at Yeni Akit reporter Talha Çolak, but blame Turkey's authoritarian regime for "forcing journalists to earn their living through smear campaigns and defamation."

== Personal life ==
Erdemir is married to archaeologist and art historian Dr. Tuğba Tanyeri-Erdemir, an expert on the cultural heritage of religious minorities in the Middle East, who works as the coordinator of the Anti-Defamation League's Task Force on Middle East Minorities.

== Awards ==
On April 27, 2016, Norwegian human rights and religious freedom organization Stefanus Alliance International awarded Erdemir the Stefanus Prize for his outstanding contributions to defending freedom of religion or belief as defined by the Article 18 of the Universal Declaration of Human Rights.

On December 5, 2020, the Hellenic American Leadership Council presented Erdemir the First Freedom Award for his "outspoken defense of minority rights and religious freedom in Turkey and the broader Middle East."

In November 2014, Junior Chamber International chose Erdemir as "Turkey’s most outstanding young person in the field of politics, law and public administration" for his efforts in "fighting against discrimination and hate crimes and his bid to contribute to the development of governance and democracy in Turkey."
