= Munsu Water Park =

Water park in Pyongyang, North Korea

- Interactive map of Munsu Water Park
- Coordinates: 39.0396°N 125.7812°E
- Opened: November 2013
- Operating season: Year round (indoor only)
- Area: 15 hectares (37 acres)
- Pools: Indoor and outdoor pools
- Water slides: 6 outdoor, 2 indoor water slides

Munsu Water Park (Korean: 문수물놀이장) is a state run water park located in the east of Pyongyang, North Korea, which opened to the public in November 2013. The park covers an area of 15 hectares (37 acres) with indoor and outdoor activities, the former of which are available all year round.

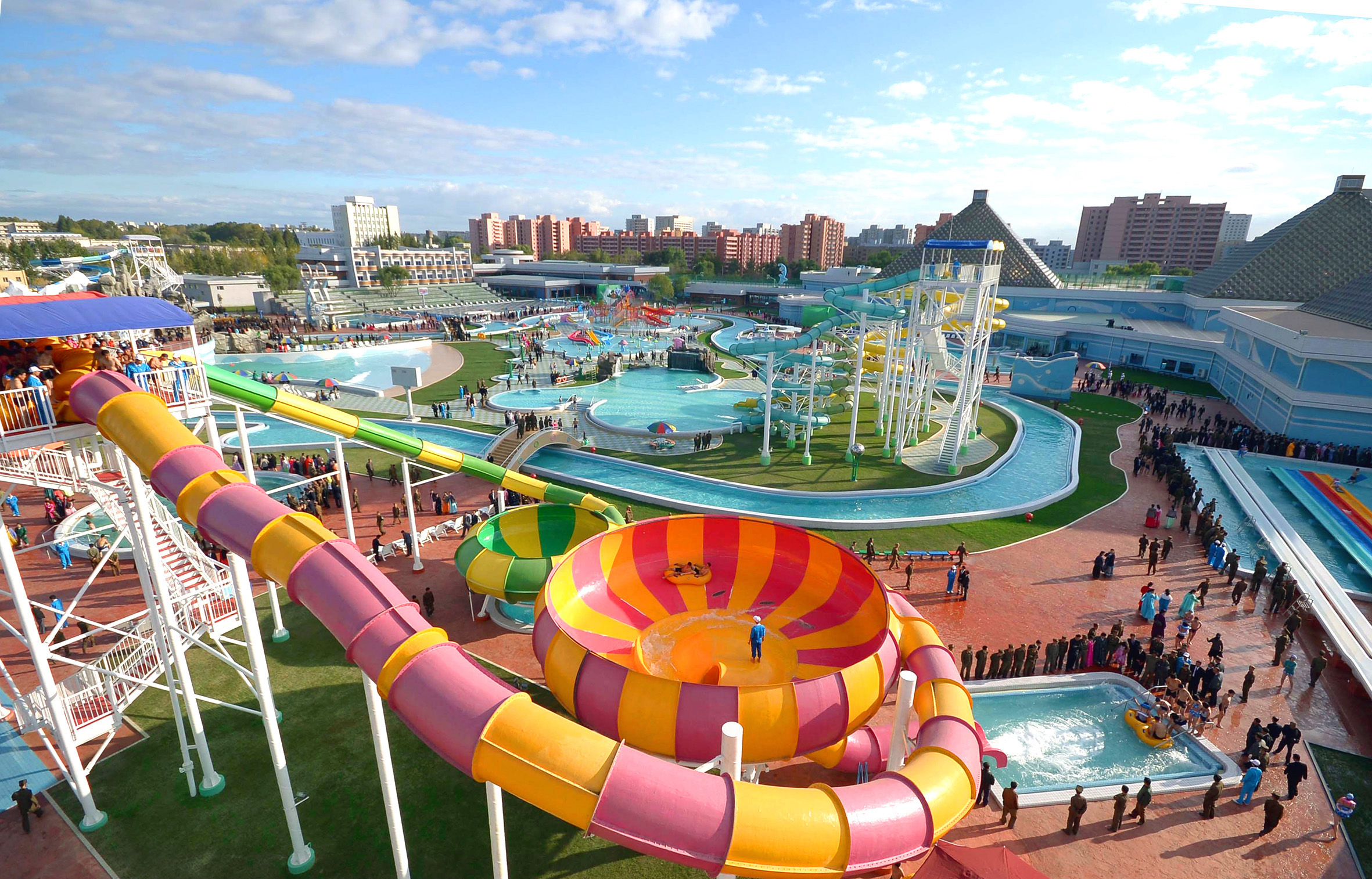
Outdoor area of Munsu Water Park

== Completion ceremony ==
The park's completion ceremony took place on 15 October 2013 and involved the chiefs of the armed forces along with top government officials. Premier of North Korea Pak Pong-ju delivered a speech saying that "The water park is the edifice built thanks to Korean People's Army service personnel's spirit of devotedly carrying out any project and their fighting traits as they are ready to flatten even a high mountain at a go in hearty response to the order of the supreme commander."

== Facilities ==
The park has indoor and outdoor swimming pools, diving boards, platforms, 14 water slides, a volleyball court, basketball court, a rock-climbing wall, a hair salon, a buffet restaurant, a cafe, and a bar. A life-size statue of Kim Jong Il stands in the foyer of the indoor swimming pool.

== See also ==
- Tourism in North Korea
