= Tourism in North Korea =

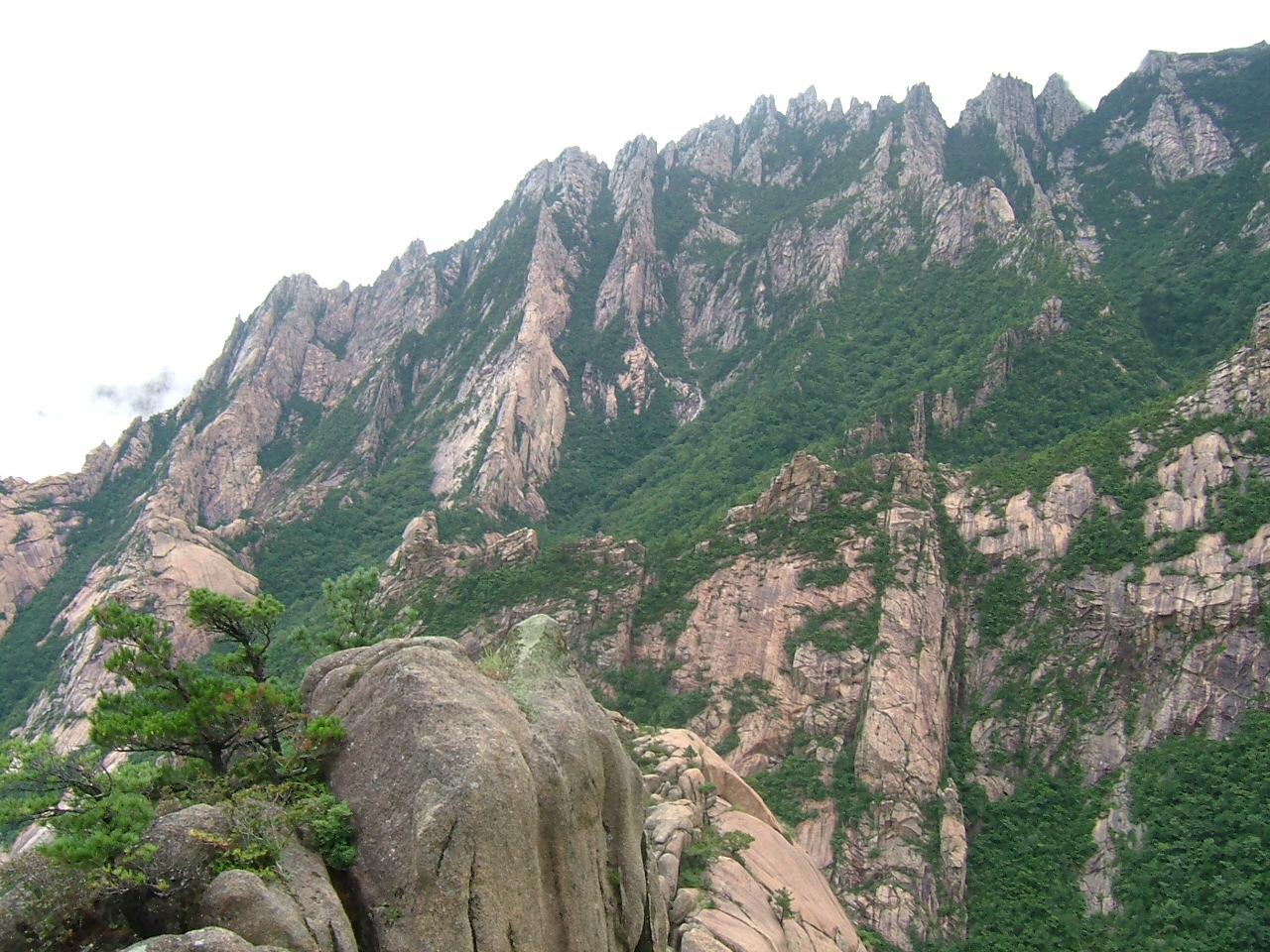
Mount Kumgang

Tourism in North Korea is tightly controlled by the North Korean government. All tourism is organized by several state-owned tourism bureaus, including Korea International Travel Company (KITC, 조선국제려행사), Korean International Sports Travel Company (KISTC,조선국제체육려행사), Korean International Taekwondo Tourism Company (KITTC,조선국제태권도려행사) and Korean International Youth Travel Company (KIYTC,조선청년국제려행사). The majority of tourists are Chinese nationals: one 2019 estimate indicated that up to 120,000 Chinese tourists had visited North Korea in the previous year, compared to fewer than 5,000 from Western countries.

In response to the COVID-19 pandemic in North Korea, North Korea closed its borders to foreign tourists on 22 January 2020. As of April 2021, the resulting economic losses were estimated to be at least US$175 million. In January 2024, it was announced that a group of Russian tourists would be allowed into the country, the first tourists since the border closure. In February 2025, North Korea reopened tourism to foreigners after five years of lockdown, with Pyongyang, the capital city, still off limits. However, only a month later, North Korea closed its borders again in March 2025.

== History and overview ==
Tourism in North Korea started developing in the 1980s: the National Tourism Administration of North Korea was established and the country joined the United Nations World Tourism Organization (UNWTO). Built in view of the World Festival of Youth and Students in 1989, the Chongnyon Hotel (chongnyon (청년) meaning 'youth' in Korean) was the fourth high-capacity accommodation built in Pyongyang since the Korean War and the first built specifically with foreign tourists in mind. This hotel, one of the longest-operating hotels in the country, was still qualified as "basic" in a 2019 survey of non-Korean guests (power outages and hard mattresses are cited among other deterrents), although two of the hotel's upper floors were renovated in 2017. The 47-story Yanggakdo International Hotel gets better reviews; it was built by a French construction company between 1986 and 1992, although it opened only in 1995. With its one thousand rooms and a revolving restaurant on the top floor, it is the largest and most-visited by international guests.

The Ryugyong Hotel and leisure center was less fortunate: started in 1987, its construction was halted in 1992 because of the country's economic crisis in the wake of the dissolution of the Soviet Union. Construction resumed in 2008, the exterior was completed in 2011, partial opening was announced for 2013 but was cancelled, and in 2024 the government was looking for a casino operator willing to complete the building in exchange for profits from the casino.

The Tour Guide-Interpreter School was opened on February 5, 1987, to train tour guides proficient in foreign languages.

In 1998, Mount Kumgang near the southern border was opened to South Korean visitors and received almost two million South Korean tourists between 1998 and 2008. Mount Kumgang Tourist Region, which was jointly administered by the North and South Korean governments, was established in 2002, but South Korean tourism to the region was halted after a South Korean citizen was shot there by a North Korean soldier in 2008. The North Korean government announced plans to demolish all South Korean-built facilities in the region in 2019, and most facilities were gone by 2024. The closure of the Mount Kumgang Tourist Region Administration, an office of the North Korean government, was announced in 2024.

In 2001, North Korea established formal ties with Spain and sent a diplomatic mission to the UNWTO headquarters in Madrid, to gain knowledge and develop connections.

Rungra People's Pleasure Ground, an amusement park with a dolphinarium on Rungra island in Pyongyang, was opened in 2012.

The new policy of byungjin was declared in 2013, aiming at developing both the nuclear weapons program and the economy – the latter including tourism with a nationwide development planning. Following this, North Korea has pursued the construction of tourism infrastructure in recent years: the Masikryong Ski Resort and the Yangdok Hot Spring Cultural Recreation Center were opened in 2013 and 2019 respectively.

The long-stalled and long-deserted Wonsan Kalma Coastal Tourist Area on the east coast, started in 2018: its achievement had been prioritized even above rebuilding areas damaged by flooding in the northern part of the country; its size suggests that it has been planned with Chinese tourists in mind. Wonsan-Kalma opened in July 2025 to domestic tourists, six years after its original planned date of completion.

The Tour Guide-Interpreter School of 1987 became the Pyongyang Tourism College in April 2014 and its tour guide curriculum expanded with training in tourism management and tourism administration, with some online education options, 3-to-6 month overseas training for lecturers, and foreign visiting lecturers providing language and specialized instruction to both students and teachers. In 2016, linked with Make It Happen agency, it started receiving volunteer teachers for 1-week or 2-weeks engagements, to teach English and Chinese.

The government also seeks to develop other types of tourism besides the basic sight-seeing of national landmarks such as Panmunjom (where the 1953 armistice that ended the Korean War was signed), Kaesong or Nampo special cities. It offers alternative activities such as participation in the Pyongyang Marathon (open to foreign professionals since 2000 and to foreign amateurs since 2014) or surfing tours, and in 2019 it turned towards medical tourism: the Treatment Tourism Exchange Corporation was established in or shortly before December 2019 to manage the development of health clinics aimed at tourists.

As of 2021, it is estimated that Kim Jong-Un has spent US$7.8 billion in hotel renovations and tourism amenities. In 2023, he had a law adopted on "revitalizing" tourism.

=== Politics behind the tourism push ===
As a result of international economic sanctions, the country's economy is in dire need of foreign currency; (Note: North Korea's economy has long been heavily impaired by international economic sanctions, starting in the 1950s with those imposed by the United States who reinforced the sanction regime in the 1980s (the U.S.A. added North Korea to its list of state sponsors of terrorism in 1988). These sanctions were eased during the 1990s when South Korea's then-liberal government attempted to set a more amenable dialogue with North Korea; but were reestablished when the country officially withdrew from the Nuclear Non-Proliferation Treaty in 2003, and reinforced over time following the continuation of nuclear tests. Thus the first trade bans only concerned weapons-related materials and goods, but were progressively complemented with that of luxury goods to target the elites, then financial assets, banking transactions, and they eventually concerned general travel and trade. Its exports are severely restricted.) and tourism is one of the few economic sectors yet more or less untouched (Note: UN sanctions do impair the development of luxury tourism. For example, a ski-lift for Masikryong ski resort fell under the 2013 ban of luxury goods trade and, after three failed deals, had to be acquired via China whose interpretation of the sanctions excludes ski resorts from the banned "luxury" category.) by the UN sanctions.

The regime is also hoping to ride the booming wave that has been lifting global tourism in East Asia since the 2000s and even more spectacularly in the 2010s. Therefore, the government has invested heavily in various aspects of tourism, with some positive results. Although the absence of official statistics does not allow for a clear view of North Korea’s results in regard of its tourism strategy, it is estimated that tourism revenues have increased by approximately 400 percent between 2014 and 2019. This provided revenues and foreign currency for the regime, up until the country closed its borders to international travelers in January 2020.

Even before the pandemic, however, foreign visitors were notably too few to justify such big investments, and the cost of their services makes them entirely inaccessible to North Koreans beyond the narrow fringe of the very rich – for example, as of 2021, a one-night stay in the Hyangsan Hotel cost $1,500, which corresponds to nearly 85% of the average annual income of a North Korean. From the outside, these touristic establishments are seen as "prestigious propaganda project for the [North Korean] regime."

Defectors from North Korea are mostly against foreign tourism. Their view is that income from tourism serves to prolong and support the regime, not the people. The average North Korean is also not allowed to have any contact with tourists (and is put at great risk if such contact is forced upon them), therefore, tourists have very little impact, if any, on changing North Koreans' views about the rest of the world and their own country's actual development or lack thereof; the few people that are allowed to approach tourists already know enough about the outside world. Moreover, tourists are kept away from experiencing or witnessing the way most citizens live day-to-day, and are particularly kept away from any negative experiences, meaning they return with false perceptions of the reality in North Korea. One defector goes as far as saying that "in North Korea the positive effects of tourism are about 1% and the negative effects 99%."

Tourism in North Korea has been described as a "catch-22": for expensive projects aimed at tourists to provide the expected return-on-investment, the North Korean government will have to lift many of the strong restrictions it puts on both tourists and citizens; one defector underlines that "if they do that, tourism will have a much greater impact on the people."

== Restrictions and warnings ==
=== Registering upon arrival ===
Travellers must register with North Korean government authorities within 24 hours of their arrival. This is done through their host organization or their hotel.

=== Contact with the local population ===
Interactions between foreign tourists and local people have historically been tightly controlled.

In 2024, talking to North Koreans without authorisation is considered spying (and punished as such). (Note: North Koreans cannot travel freely in their own country: movement outside their city or county of residence is banned. They need either a "business trip certificate" or a "travel certificate.")

=== International communications ===
As of January 2013, foreigners can buy SIM cards at Pyongyang airport, providing access to international calling.

As North Koreans are severely punished for making (or receiving) international calls, watching any foreign programs, videos, etc., visitors put local people at very high risk by merely showing them, let alone lending them, their own mobile phones, iPods and other similar devices. (Note: The "crime of illegal international communications" (article 222, from 2015), harshly punishes North Koreans who talk on the phone or otherwise communicate with the outside world; they risk up to a year in a labour brigade or up to five years in a labour camp. In 2020, the government extended the existing criminal code with the introduction of a new "Law on the Elimination of Reactionary Thought and Culture" that sets out specific punishments for both viewers and distributors of foreign media. This repression has been tightened since the pandemic. In November 2021, a man who had smuggled from China and sold copies of the South Korean Netflix series "Squid Game" was sentenced to death by firing squad, one underage youngster who had bought a copy was sentenced to life imprisonment, at least six other youngsters caught watching it were sentenced to five years hard labour, and teachers and school administrators have been fired and face banishment to work in remote mines. In mid-January 2022, the daughter of the head of the political department of the South Pyongan Province branch of the Ministry of State Security (MSS), along with her boyfriend, were publicly executed for watching and distributing South Korean films, soap operas and entertainment programmes. Later that same year, a 22-year-old was publicly executed in South Hwanghae Province 2022 for listening to 70 South Korean songs, watching three South Korean movies, and distributing them to seven people.)

Satellite phones and drones are not allowed.

Western literature about North Korea is not allowed. Neither are travel guides about North Korea, South Korea or Japan. Nor are pornography, religious content, or anything critical about the North Korean government. USB drives, CDs, DVDs, tablets, laptops, smartphones, digital cameras, and other electronic devices are thoroughly investigated by customs officers upon arrival.

=== Use of local currency ===
Foreigners are forbidden to use the North Korean won: they must use foreign currency. The euro is the most widely accepted foreign currency; US dollars and Chinese yuan are also widely accepted. Exchanging currencies is difficult; visitors cannot use ATMs, traveller's cheques, or debit and credit cards and are advised to take enough foreign cash for their trip in small denominations.

=== Respect towards the North Korean leaders and nation ===
The Swedish diplomatic mission to North Korea emphasises that contempt for the North Korean nation, its leaders and its symbols such as its national flag, portraits of their leaders, propaganda posters, etc., are regarded by North Korean authorities as very offensive. There is very little tolerance for what the government considers as disruptive behaviour, and this can lead to long term imprisonment, hard labour or death.

Visitors are advised to avoid referring to the country as "North Korea" and instead use DPRK (Democratic People's Republic of Korea).

=== Shopping ===
Visitors are not allowed to shop elsewhere than at stores designated for foreigners.

=== Taking photos ===
Taking photos of anything other than designated public tourist sites is considered to be spying and punished as such. Visitors must always ask their designated guide for permission before taking photos, especially photos of people, including the guides. Particularly sensitive topics are: anything involving North Korean military zones, military property, and soldiers; scenes of poverty; and construction sites.

Photos of statues must include the whole statue; close-ups of the head of a statue are forbidden.

Digital cameras or video cameras must not have GPS devices.

=== Fashion and dress laws ===
The law about fashion and dress codes is very strict for North Koreans, (Note: As of 2024, off-limits fashion items for North Koreans include jeans, dyed hair, shoulder bags, "rooster hairstyle", blouses with see-through sleeves, non-creased pants, T-shirts with foreign lettering, and, specifically for women, hair below the waist, shorts and figure-hugging tops. All fall under the "Rejection of Reactionary Thought and Culture Law". Moreover, displaying the same hair-style and other dress and fashion style as Kim Jong-Un (e.g. wide-legged pants, or a leather trenchcoat) and as those around him, is also illegal. On the other hand, these bans do not apply to people in Kim Jong-Un's inner circle. Talking with the South Korean accent is regarded as "a counterrevolutionary crime that can disintegrate our internal affairs." In December 2022, a college student who used that accent on his phone was expelled and sent to a coal mine.) but more relaxed for tourist foreigners. Shorts and light clothing are acceptable in summer.

Only two venues in the country have strict clothing requirements, where the clothes must be seen as appropriate and respectful: at the Mansudae Grand Monument, men must wear long trousers and enclosed shoes (sneakers, travel/hiking boots are fine but no sandals or flip flops). Women are required to wear long trousers or a skirt or dress that ends below the knees; open dress shoes and sneakers are fine but not flip flops or sandals.

Visiting the Kumsusan Palace of the Sun in Pyongyang requires wearing pants (for men) and dresses or skirts that end below the knees (for women) with a (non-transparent) shirt or blouse; formal wear is more appreciated, but smart casual is also accepted as long as one wears a button up shirt with collar. Jeans, trousers with tears, shorts, short skirts, flip flops and sandals are forbidden.

At the Munsu Water Park, acceptable swimwear is provided with the entry fee.

=== US and Canadian citizens ===
Since 1 September 2017, the United States Department of State has prohibited the use of U.S. passports (except those with a special validation) for travel to North Korea, arguing that U.S. citizens have been subject to arrest and long detention for actions that would not otherwise be a cause for arrest in the United States or other countries. The U.S. Department of State also states that it has received reports of North Korean authorities detaining U.S. citizens without charges and not allowing them to depart the country.

North Korea has detained U.S. citizens who were part of organized tours.

As of October 2024, Canada recommends avoiding all travel to North Korea (the highest level of security recommendation).

=== South Korean citizens ===
As of 2026, North Korea is still technically at war with South Korea. Adopted on 18 January 2023, the Pyongyang Cultural Language Protection Act criminalises South Korean vernacular; possible sanctions include the death penalty.

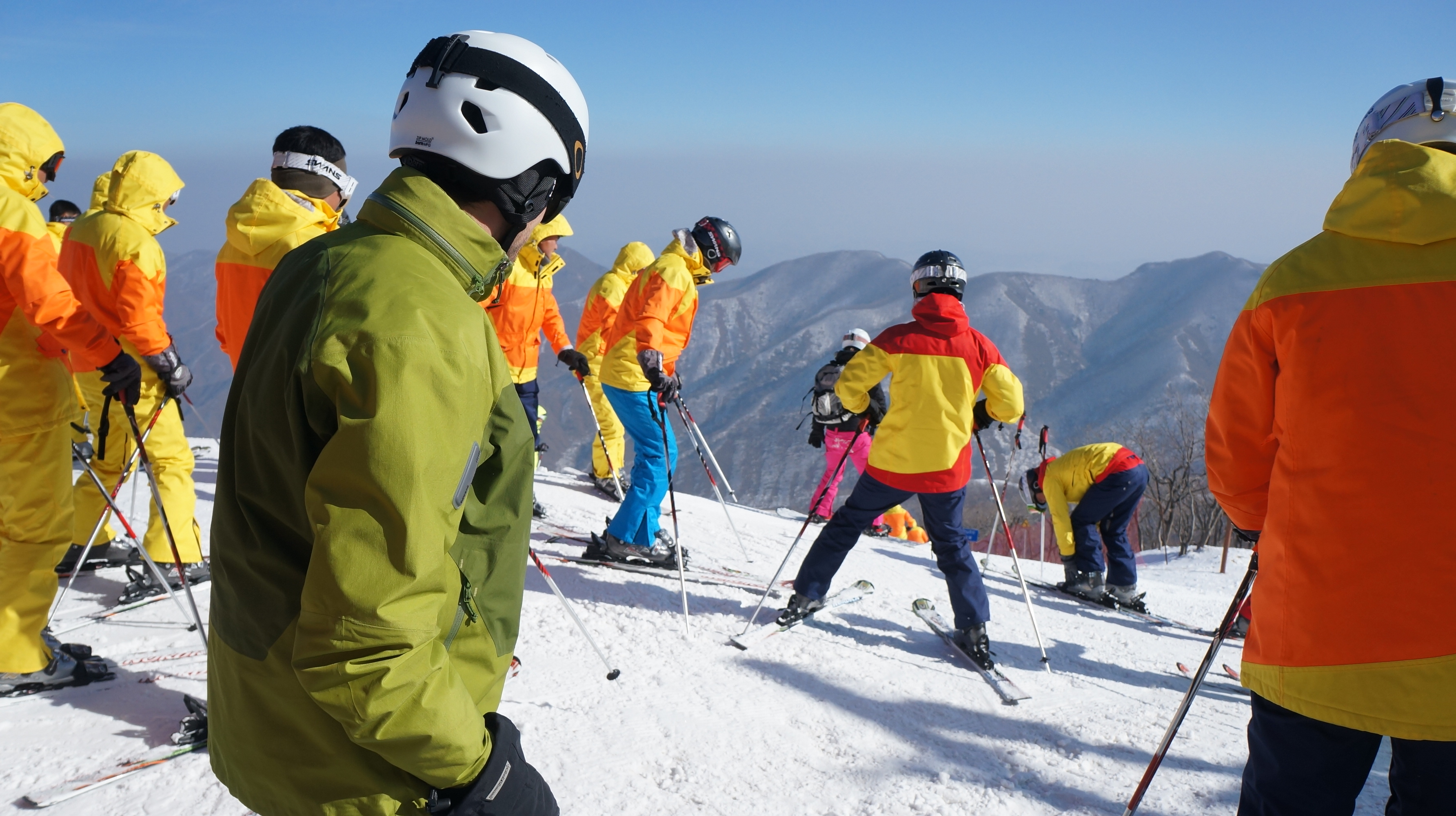
Foreign tourists in Masikryong Ski Resort (2014)

== Guided tours ==
Free tourist visits are not allowed, individually or in group: guided tours are mandatory. Since December 2013, North Korea has been open to tourists during the winter. The Masikryong Ski Resort outside Wonsan City in Kangwon Province opened in early 2014. While tourists have historically been restricted to Pyongyang, some tours have recently been able to expand to other parts of the country such as Rajin (and the market there) and Chongjin.

Tourists can fly directly to Pyongyang from Beijing, Shenyang, Vladivostok and Moscow, with train services to Pyongyang from Beijing and Dandong also available.

=== Tourists from Western countries ===
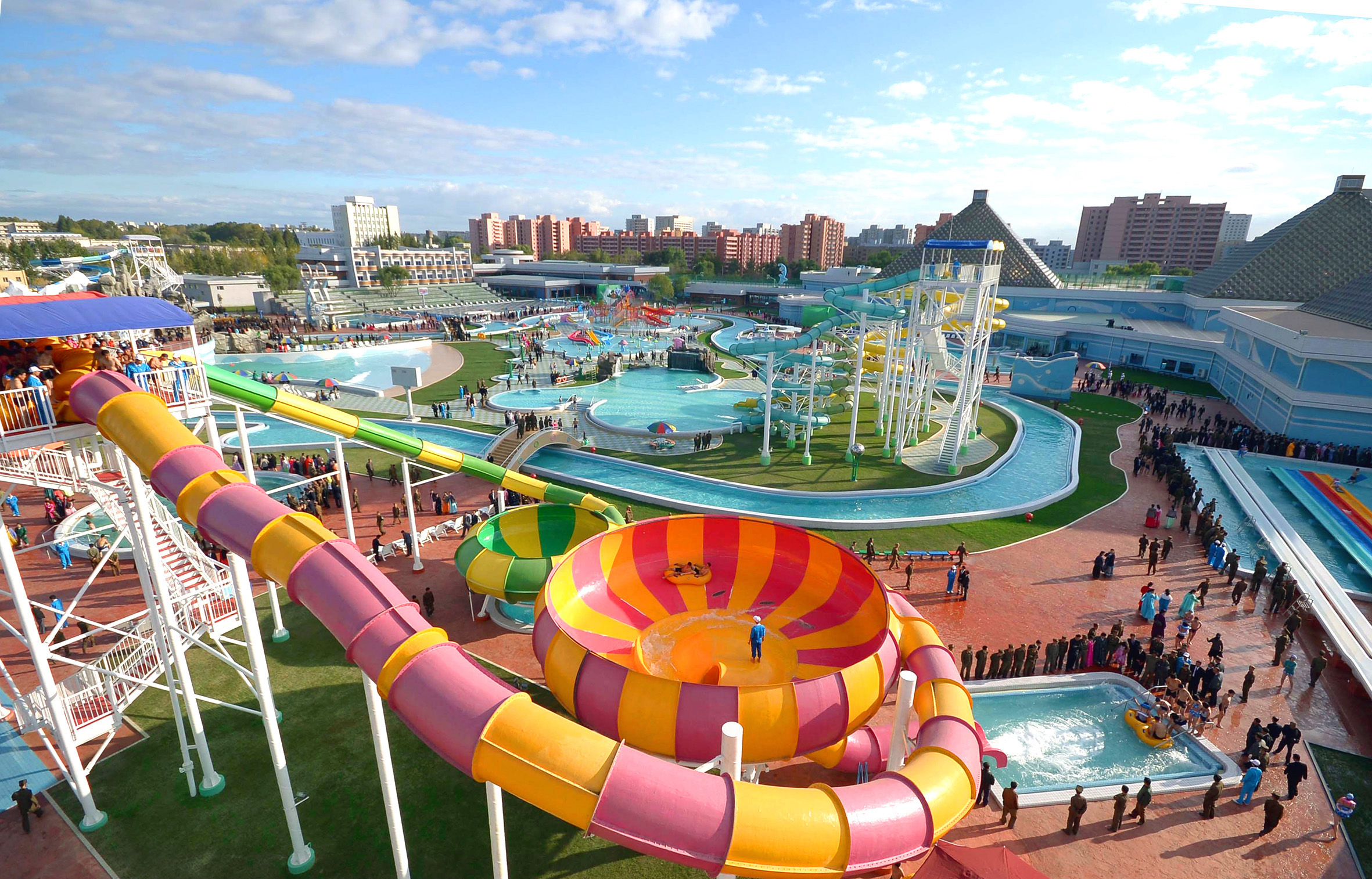
Munsu Water Park

For Westerners, there are a small number of private tour operators that help provide access to North Korea. These include Koryo Tours (known for its North Korean-related films such as Comrade Kim Goes Flying and strong history in the region); Uri Tours (known for its role in Dennis Rodman's and Eric Schmidt's trips to North Korea); Lupine Travel (a UK-based budget travel agency known for its DPRK Amateur Golf Open); Rocky Road Travel (a Berlin based company); Juche Travel Services (a UK-based company); and KTG (known for their small sized groups and affordable tours). FarRail Tours also used to take tours to see operating steam railways and the Pyongyang Metro, but their last such tour was in 2019.

In 2016, an American college student, Otto Warmbier, was arrested on a charge of taking a propaganda poster from a wall in his Pyongyang hotel, and sentenced to 15 years' imprisonment. Warmbier had been traveling with China-based tour operator Young Pioneer Tours (YPT) on a five-day tour of North Korea. He was released in a coma in June 2017 and returned to the U.S. where he died on 19 June 2017. As a result, YPT announced it would no longer take U.S. citizens to North Korea as the risk was "too high". Other North Korea tour companies announced they would also review their positions on accepting U.S. citizens. In July 2017, the U.S. government announced that U.S. citizens would no longer be permitted to visit North Korea as tourists (passports are declared invalid for such travel to, in, or through the country). The one-year travel ban took effect on September 1, 2017, and has been extended annually since then. The latest ban extension expires on August 31, 2027.

=== Tours from South Korea ===
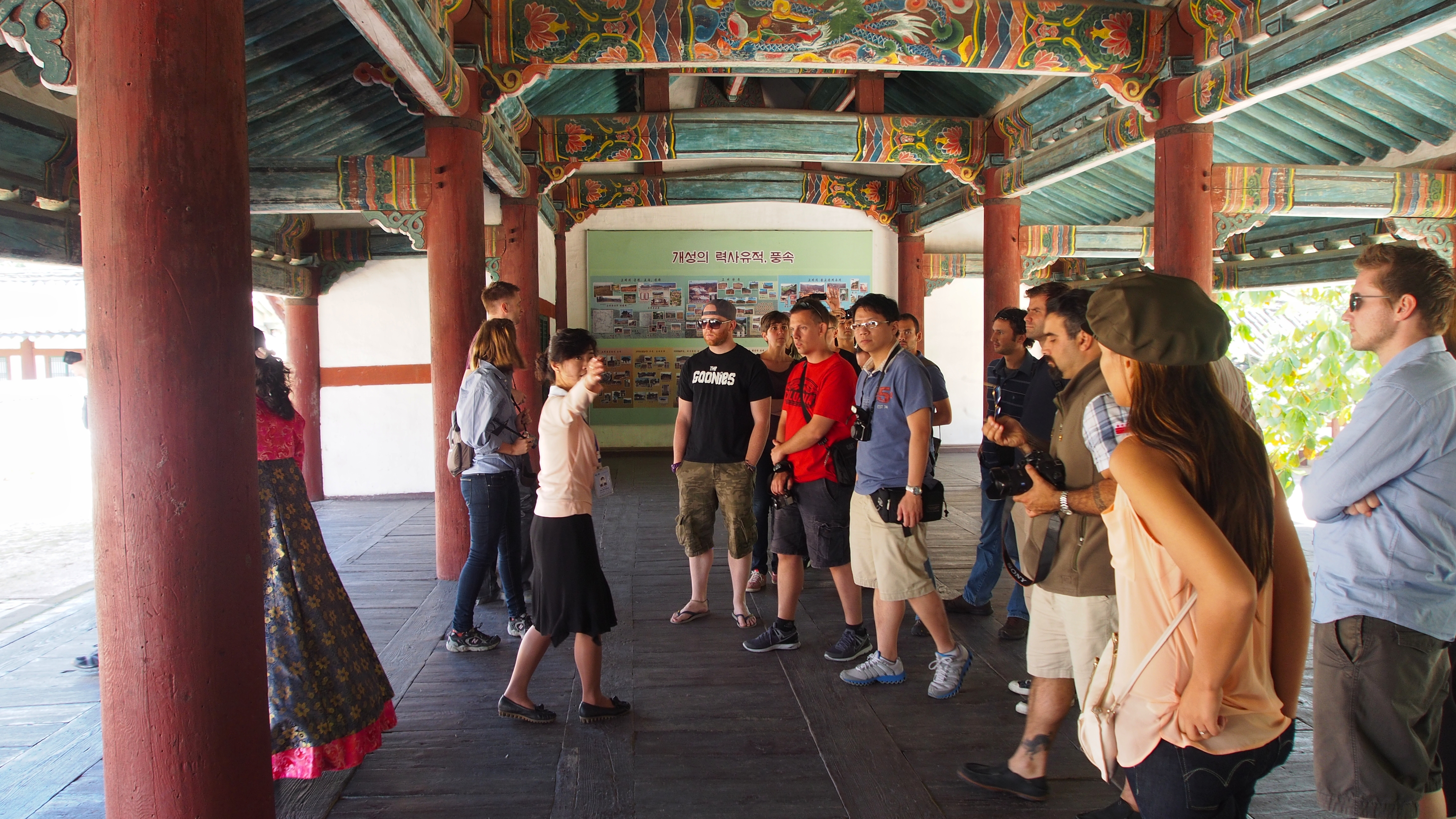
Touring the Koryo Museum at Songgyungwan in Kaesong

In 2002, the area around Mount Kumgang, a scenic mountain close to the South Korea border, was designated as a special tourist destination: Mount Kumgang Tourist Region. Tours run by private companies brought thousands of South Koreans to Mount Kŭmgang every year before the suspension of tours in late 2008 due to the shoot-to-kill of a South Korean tourist. When tours had not resumed by May 2010, North Korea unilaterally announced that it would seize South Korean real estate assets in the region.

In July 2005, the South Korean company Hyundai Group came to an agreement with the North Korean government to open up more areas to tourism, including Baekdu Mountain and Kaesong. Kaesong was opened to daily tours for South Korean and foreign tourists in December 2007; North Korea charged US $180 for a one-day trip. The city received several hundred tourists each week, mostly South Koreans.

The tours to Kaesong were suspended in December 2008 due to a political conflict between North and South Korea relating to propaganda balloons. The balloons, filled with information critical of Kim Jong-il and the North Korean regime, were sent into North Korea from just south of the border in South Korea. When South Korea did not respond to North Korean demands to stop the propaganda balloons, North Korea suspended the Kaesong tours. The tours to Kaesong resumed in April 2010, but were again suspended in May 2010 following the ROKS Cheonan sinking.

=== Tours from China ===
In September 2008, North Korea was officially designated as the destination of organized outbound tours for Chinese residents by the Chinese government. The Chinese government listed North Korea as an "Approved Destination" in 2010 — a status which facilitates Chinese citizens' tourist visits to the country.

In April 2010, the first tourist trains from Dandong, China, brought visitors to North Korea for a four-day tour. Before that, the international train from Beijing to Pyongyang was used as a tourist train.

In June 2011, Chinese citizens were allowed on a self-driven tour in North Korea for the first time.

As of January 2013, tourists are now able to bring their own mobile phones into North Korea, although the phone cannot make or receive calls without a North Korean SIM card (which became available to foreigners). Previously, foreigners had to surrender their phones at the border (or airport) before entering the country.

The number of Chinese tourists visiting North Korea fell 70 percent from 2010 to 2011. One Chinese travel agency cited the limited number of packages and restrictions on where foreign tourists can travel as the main reasons for the lack of interest. Only the capital Pyongyang and Mount Kumgang are available on Chinese itineraries. In 2012, 237,000 Chinese tourists visited North Korea; they were more than 350,000 in 2019 - the most ever, bringing in around $175 million that year, with China responsible for roughly 95% of that total. But most Chinese tourists visit for less than one week, and very few of them make a second trip.

Various places are accessible from the Chinese side, such as Namyang and monasteries in Chilbosan (North Hamgyong, N. Korea) from Tumen (Jilin, China). In 2011, a Tumen-Korean train service was scheduled to start.

Though gambling is prohibited for North Korean citizens, two casinos exist in North Korea for the Chinese tourist market: the Imperial Hotel & Casino in Rason and the Pyongyang Casino in the Yanggakdo International Hotel in Pyongyang.

Changbai Millennium Cliff City, straddling the border with China, was opened in 2021 and allowed visitors to peek into the North Korean city of Hyesan (Ryanggang Province).

== Visa ==
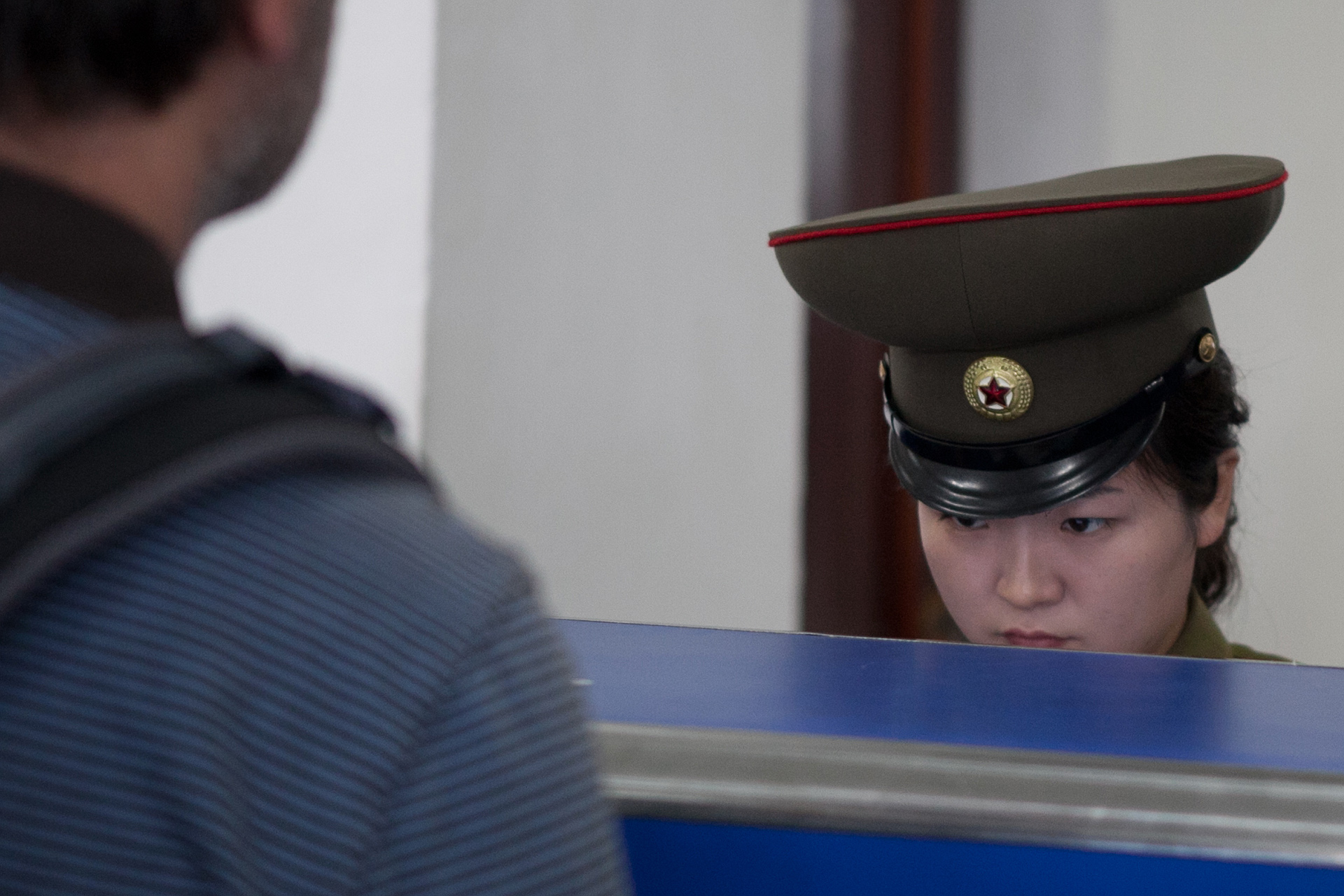
Entry into North Korea through Pyongyang Sunan International Airport

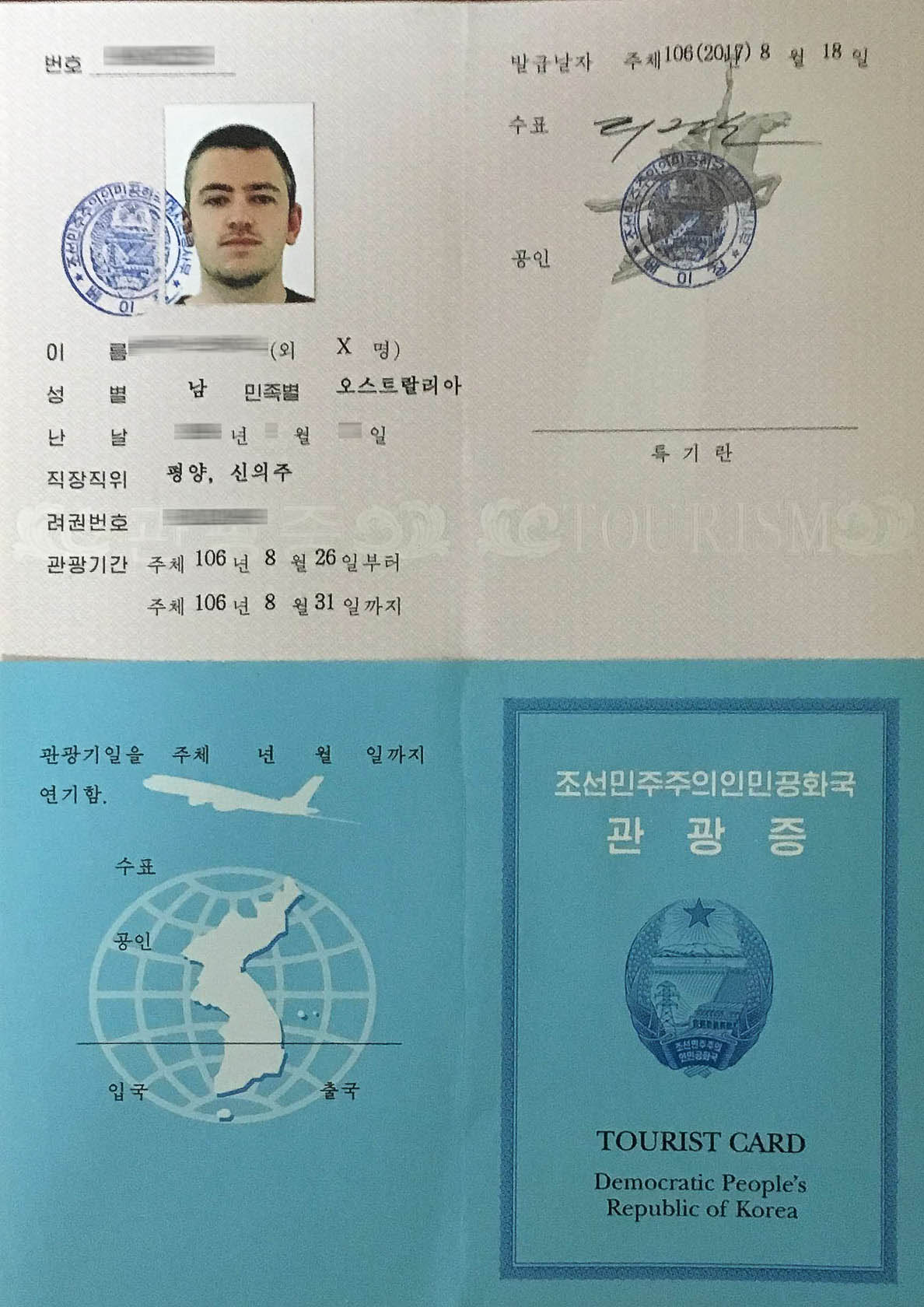
North Korean tourist visa in form of a tourist card

In principle, any person is allowed to travel to North Korea; only South Koreans and journalists are routinely denied, although there have been some exceptions for journalists. For instance, Croatian journalists had special access in June 2012, although their phones were confiscated and returned as they departed and they had a special tour guide.

As of 2024, visas must be processed through licensed agents — although according to chinatours.com, one can personally apply for a visa at the North Korean embassy in one's home country - if there is one; but it takes longer and requires going to said embassy.

A tourist visa comes in the form of a blue travel paper stating "tourist card" (Korean: 관광증; MR: kwankwangchŭng) and bearing the country's official name (Democratic People's Republic of Korea) in English and Korean, which is stamped by North Korean customs instead of the passport. The travel paper is taken away upon exiting the country. The tourist visa can also be issued, upon request, in the form of a sticker endorsed in the visitor's passport. However this is only possible if there are any diplomatic representations of North Korea in the visitor's home country. Visitors are not allowed to travel outside designated tour areas without their Korean guides.

Before 2010, tourists holding United States passports were not granted visas, except during the Arirang Festival mass games. U.S. citizens, journalists and citizens from other nations had also been given special permission to enter as members of the Korean Friendship Association and Choson Exchange. Citizens of South Korea require special permission from both governments to enter North Korea and are typically not granted such permission for regular tourism except in special tourist areas designated for South Koreans.

Only a small number of tourists are allowed each year and the length of their stay is limited to a few days, which can be taken any time within the duration of the visa's validity, usually three or six months (but it does not mean that someone can stay for three or six months in North Korea).

Chinese citizens who wish to visit Tongrim County as tourists can enter with only their Chinese ID card for up to two days (in 2024).

Only citizens of Singapore and Malaysia were allowed to enter North Korea on normal passports without a visa; but these exemptions were revoked for both nationalities in February 2017.

== Post-pandemic reopening of borders for tourism ==
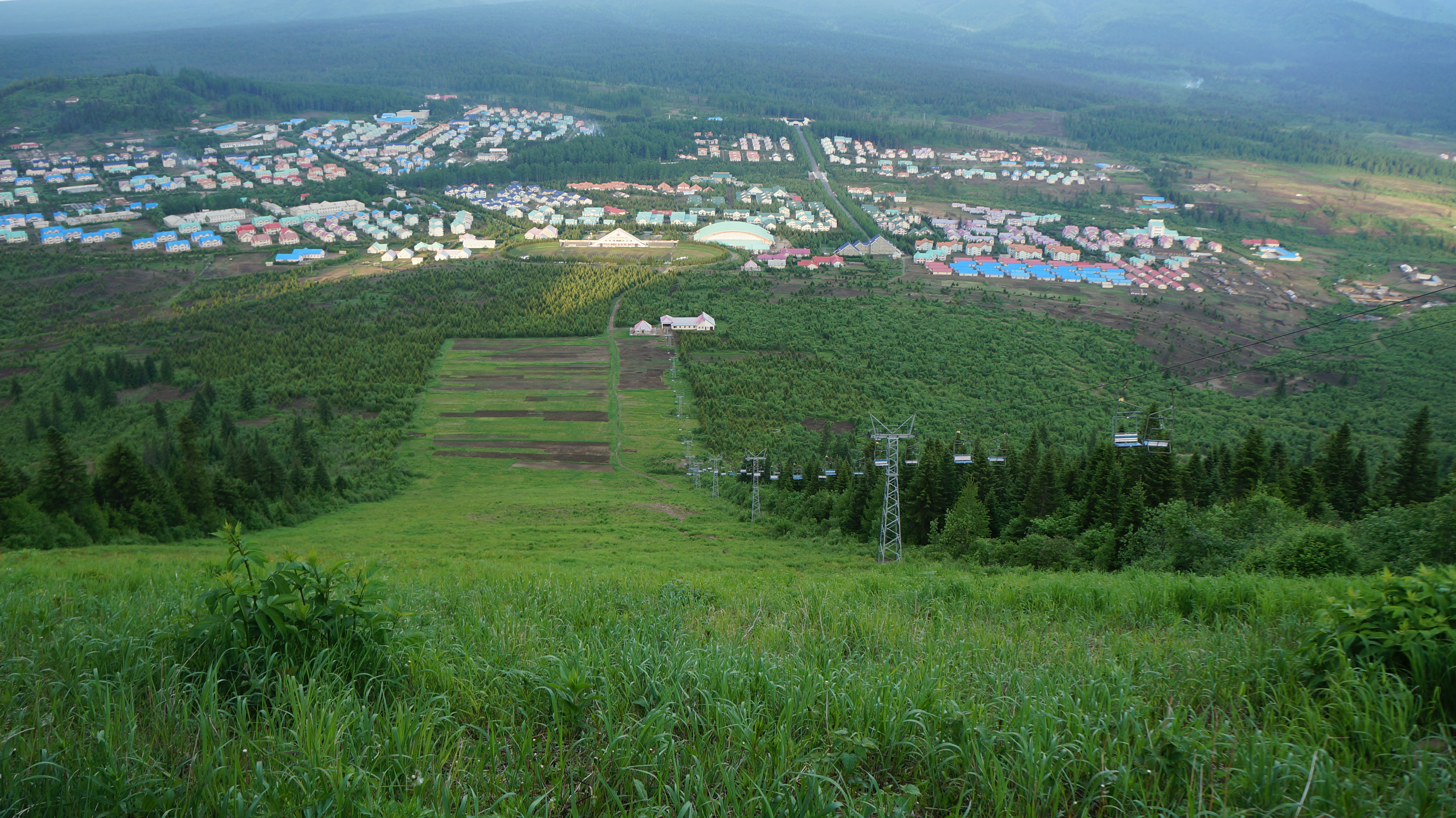
Samjiyon ski resort, June 2014

Due to a rise in COVID-19 cases, the North Korean government decided to close its borders for visitors in January 2020.

In July 2023, Russian and Chinese delegations were the first known foreign groups to be invited to the country since the borders were closed in January 2020; they went to Pyongyang for the 70th anniversary of the Korean War armistice. Around August 16, 2023, two busloads from North Korea crossed the Yalu River bordering China, disembarking in the Chinese city of Dandong. Journalists assumed that the people riding those buses were North-Korean athletes on their way to the Kazakh capital Astana for the taekwondo world championships. In February 2024, a first group of 100 Russian tourists had a four-day trip to Masikryong ski resort (which opened in 2014), near the eastern coastal town of Wonsan; the group came in on a flight from Vladivostok to Pyongyang with Air Koryo. In February and March 2024 altogether, three groups totalling more than 200 Russian tourists were allowed to spend time in North Korea. Two hiking trips to North Korea had also been planned for the Russian holidays in May 2024. But at least one scheduled tour from Russia was canceled due to a lack of demand.

On August 14, 2024, the government announced its intent to open the country’s borders for international tourism after almost 5 years, beginning in December 2024 with the recently redeveloped city of Samjiyŏn, popular for its winter sports facilities and close proximity to Mount Paektu. The extent to which North Korea as a whole will reopen is unknown. Western tourists are still banned from visiting the country, with North Korea allowing firstly tourists from allied nations such as China and Russia.

From February to early September 2024, about 600 Russian tourists have visited North Korea, mainly the capital Pyongyang, and the special city of Rason on the east coast near Russia.

== See also ==
- List of hotels in North Korea
- List of tourist attractions in Pyongyang
- Masikryong Ski Resort
- Munsu Water Park
- Korea Central Zoo
- Propaganda in North Korea
- Revolutionary Site
- State General Bureau of Tourist Guidance
- Visa policy of North Korea
