= 16th and 17th Republican People's Party Extraordinary Conventions =

Turkish political special sessions

CHP Extraordinary Convention, 2012
- Proposed motions: reducing the number of party council members from 80 to 60; setting the number of central executive committee members to 17; introducing online party membership application opportunities; reducing the percentage of nominations needed to run for the party leadership from 20% to 10%; establishing an "honorary committee" for former party grandees which previously served in high office; giving at least 40% of all party funding from the treasury to local party associations; establishing a 33% gender quota for MP candidates and party wing members.

Results
Choice	Votes	%
Yes	669	64.89%
No	362	35.11%
Valid votes	1,031	100.00%
Invalid or blank votes	0	0.00%
Total votes	1,031	100.00%
Registered voters/turnout	1,247	82.69%

The 16th and 17th Republican People's Party Extraordinary Conventions (Turkish: 16. ve 17. Cumhuriyet Halk Partisi olağanüstü kurultayları) were held on 26 and 27 February 2012 respectively. Two separate conventions were held, since the Republican People's Party (CHP) of Turkey had the changing of several party regulations on its agenda. The rare occasion in which two extraordinary conventions were held on two days in a row resulted in the CHP being nicknamed the "party of conventions." The 16th convention saw party policy, achievements and proposed regulation changes being discussed, with a new party council elected. The new council president was named as Adnan Keskin. The 17th convention was held a day later and was only attended by party delegates, who held a final discussion and then a vote on adopting the new regulations. The new regulations were accepted by a majority of the delegates, with 362 dissidents voting against. The terms of the accepted changes took effect in time for the 34th ordinary convention held on 1 March 2012.

The convention saw a split between those in favour of the regulation reforms and "dissident" party members led mainly by Manisa MP İsa Gök. Gök had claimed repeatedly that an insufficient amount of delegates (583 out of 1,247) had arrived which thus meant that the conventions could not take place. Met with boos and aggression, Gök was forced out of the convention. The newly reformed regulations included the devolution of greater powers and funding to local party associations and youth/women wings, as well as the induction of a quota for equal gender representation. Seats on the party's council were reduced but an honorary committee of party grandees was also created, while running for the party leadership was made easier. The process by which parliamentary candidates were chosen was changed and becoming a party member was made easier. The new regulations also featured changes to the party's principles, with new articles taking a tougher stance against elitism and imperialism.

During the 17th convention in which only delegates were admitted, 9 proposed changes made by the 362 dissident delegates, plus a proposed bulk change made after, were all rejected by the other delegates. The new regulations were thus voted in with a majority. In total, 47 articles of the CHP party regulations were changed as a result.
