= Bülent Tezcan =

Turkish lawyer and politician

Bülent Tezcan MP
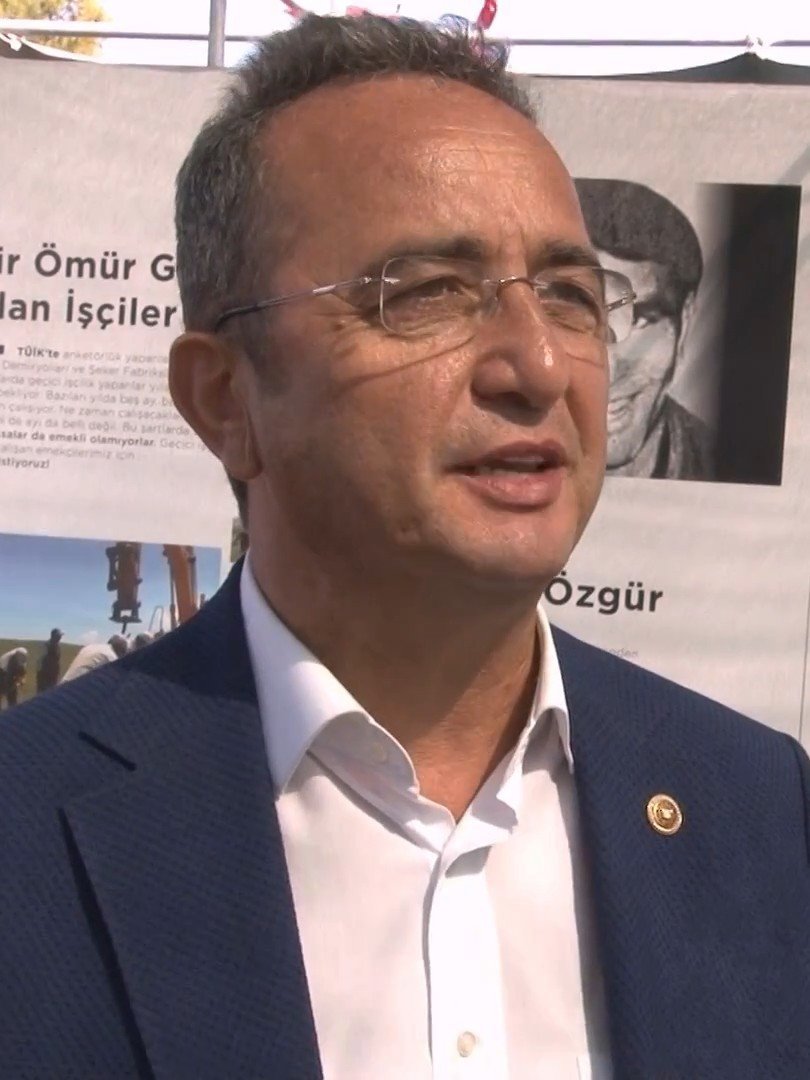

Member of the Grand National Assembly
- Incumbent
- Assumed office 12 June 2011
- Constituency: Aydın (2011, June 2015, Nov 2015, 2018, 2023)

Vice-Chairman of the CHP responsible for legal and electoral affairs
- Incumbent
- Assumed office 30 July 2012
- Leader: Kemal Kılıçdaroğlu
- Preceded by: Atila Emek

Personal details
- Born: 18 May 1965 (age 61) Havza, Samsun, Turkey
- Party: Social Democratic Populist Party (SHP); Republican People's Party (CHP)
- Education: Ankara University
- Occupation: Politician and lawyer
- Profession: Law

Bülent Tezcan (born 18 May 1965) is a Turkish lawyer and politician from the Republican People's Party (CHP) who has served as the Member of Parliament for Aydın since June 2011.

In 34th Ordinary Convention of the CHP, Bülent Tezcan was elected to the Party Council and appointed as the vice-chairman responsible for legal and electoral affairs in July 2012.
