= State General Bureau of Tourist Guidance =

North Korean state agency

Agency overview
- Formed: 15 May 1986
- Jurisdiction: North Korea
- Headquarters: Central District, Pyongyang
- Agency executive: President, Ryo Sung-chol
- Parent agency: Room 39
- Website: tourismdprk.gov.kp

Korean name
- Hangul: 국가관광총국
- Hanja: 國家觀光總局
- RR: Gukga gwangwang chongguk
- MR: Kukka kwan'gwang ch'ongguk

State General Bureau of Tourist Guidance (formerly State General Bureau of Tourism; Korean: 국가관광총국) is a North Korean state agency that organizes tourism in North Korea. Foreign tour operators have to work closely with the bureau; its staff accompanies all tours of foreigners.

The bureau was founded on 15 May 1986. It was renamed State General Bureau of Tourist Guidance in January 1990. It is based in the Central District of Pyongyang. Its president is Ryo Sung-chol. State General Bureau of Tourist Guidance has been a member of the World Tourism Organization since September 1987 and the Pacific Asia Travel Association since April 1995.

By and large, the North Korean tourism industry is overseen by Room 39, the organization in charge of North Korea's slush funds. Room 39 guides the State General Bureau of Tourism, which in turn "manages the earnings and maintains surveillance over the tourists, ensuring they are contained within specifically designated areas."

== See also ==
- Government of North Korea
- North Korea's illicit activities
