= 34th Republican People's Party Ordinary Convention =

Party election in Turkey

- Thursday, 19 July 2012

Convention leaders
Kemal Kılıçdaroğlu	Party leader Genel Başkan
Altan Öymen	Speaker; Divan Başkanı

Delegates
- Delegates voting: 1,230
- Invalid/blank votes: 149
- Registered delegates: 1,282
- Turnout: 95.9%

Elected positions
Office	Elected
Party Council	60
High Disciplinary Board	15

Conventions of the Republican People's Party

The 34th Ordinary Convention of the Republican People's Party was held on 19 July 2012 in order to elect 60 members to the Party Council and 15 members to the High Disciplinary Board of the Republican People's Party of Turkey. 1,282 delegates were eligible to vote. Former party leader Altan Öymen was elected as the Speaker of the Convention and chaired the proceedings.

== Party Council ==
434 party members were a candidate to win a seat in the party council, with the top 52 candidates who won the most votes being elected. Furthermore, 8 members were elected from a Science, Culture and Executive quota as proposed by the party leader Kemal Kılıçdaroğlu, for a total of 60 members.

=== Directly elected (52 members) ===
The members elected to the Party Council are as follows, with the number of votes they received in brackets.

- Haluk Koç (902)
- Şafak Pavey (878)
- Adnan Keskin (876)
- Umut Oran (871)
- Murat Karayalçın (850)
- Faik Öztrak (838)
- Ayşe Gülsün Bilgehan (821)
- Gökhan Günaydın (803)
- Engin Altay (787)
- İhsan Özkes (787)
- Veli Ağbaba (786)
- Levent Gök (774)
- Bihlun Tamaylıgil (772)
- Perihan Sarı (754)
- Candan Yüceer (748)
- Osman Faruk Loğoğlu (741)
- Volkan Canalioğlu (729)
- Durdu Özbolat (728)
- Hurşit Güneş (714)
- Nihad Matkap (714)
- Sena Kaleli (707)
- İlhan Cihaner (702)
- Fikri Sağlar (699)
- Faruk Demir (696)
- Zühal Samlı (696)
- Mehmet Emrehan Halıcı (686)
- Sezgin Tanrıkulu (682)
- Alaattin Yüksel (678)
- Gürsel Tekin (677)
- Saniye Nazik Işık (666)
- Ercan Karakaş (644)
- Gülseren Onanç (644)
- Onursal Adıgüzel (643)
- Halit Toraman (639)
- Bülent Tezcan (633)
- Ayşe İnci Beşpınar (627)
- Aytun Çıray (623)
- Hüseyin Yaşar (623)
- Bülent Kuşoğlu (622)
- Yakup Akkaya (619)
- Tekin Bingöl (615)
- Gökçe Pişkin (613)
- Hüseyin Saygılı (603)
- Çetin Soysal (602)
- Erdoğan Toprak (601)
- Emel Yıldırım (599)
- Ekrem Kerem Oktay (595)
- Meryem Gül Çiftçi (582)
- Lamia Yıldız Tokman (580)
- Kutsiye Benan Baykal (578)
- Berrin Gürçay Dilekçi (577)
- İbrahim Yener (574)

=== Science, Culture and Executive quota (8 members) ===
The members elected through the Science, Culture and Executive quota to the Party Council are as follows, with the number of votes they received in brackets.

- Metin Feyzioğlu (941)
- Oğuz Oyan (914)
- Hülya Güven (874)
- Sencer Ayata (864)
- Gaye Usluer (813)
- Burhan Şenatalar (752)
- Birgül Ayman Güler (750)
- Seyhan Erdoğdu (734)

== High Disciplinary Board ==
The 15 members elected to the High Disciplinary Board are as follows.

- İhsan Kalkavan
- Şenal Sarıhan
- Tülay Ateş
- Atila Emek
- Süleyha Sumru Karaer
- Mustafa Moroğlu
- Saniye Barut
- Sezgin Kaya
- Soner Karakuş
- Refik Eryılmaz
- Zühal Sirkecioğlu Dönmez
- Selahettin Balta
- Turan Aydoğan
- Mümin Akgün
- Mustafa Ülker Caner

== See also ==
- Conventions of the Republican People's Party
