= Stefanus Prize =

Human rights prize

The Stefanus Prize is a human rights prize awarded to individuals for their outstanding contributions to defending freedom of religion or belief as defined by the Article 18 of the Universal Declaration of Human Rights.

== History ==
The Stefanus Prize was established in 2005 by the Norwegian NGO Stefanus Alliance International, and has been awarded biennially since 2008. The award ceremony takes place in November in Oslo, Norway.

The first recipient of the Stefanus Prize was the Coptic Orthodox Bishop Thomas of Egypt. He received the award on November 11, 2005 for his "fearless and courageous commitment to freedom of belief and human rights in Egypt."

== Selection Committee ==
The laureates are chosen by a committee appointed by the Stefanus Alliance International. The committee was composed of following members in 2020: Ingvill Thorson Plesner (researcher at HL-senteret), Erling Rimehaug (editor and writer), Anne Beathe Kristiansen Tvinnereim (politician]), and Ingunn Yri Øystese (board member of the Stefanus Alliance International).

== Recipients of the Stefanus Prize ==
- 2005: Bishop Thomas, Egypt
- 2008: Tim A. Peters, Korea/China
- 2010: Victor Biak Lian, Burma/Myanmar
- 2012: Samuel L.S. Salifu, Nigeria
- 2014: Asma Jilani Jahangir, Pakistan
- 2016: Mine Yildirim and Aykan Erdemir, Turkey
- 2018: Ameer Jaje and Saad Salloum, Iraq
- 2020: Nguyen Bac Truyen, imprisoned Vietnamese lawyer, released 2023
- 2022: Wagma Feroz, Pakistan
- 2024: Aiman Umarova, lawyer from Kazakhstan
