= Bjørn Wegge =

Bjørn Agnar Wegge (born 28 August 1947) is a former Norwegian NGO Director. He received a Cand.philol. degree from the University of Oslo.

Between 2002 and 2013, Wegge served as the secretary-general of Stefanus Alliance International, formerly named Norwegian Mission to the East, a Christian missions and human rights organisation, with a special focus on freedom of belief and religion as expressed in Article 18 of the Universal Declaration of Human Rights.

== Career ==
After studying theology, musicology and folklore at University of Oslo ( MA degree in Religion and Philosophy), he worked as a teacher at Tryggheim Folk High School (1995-1997) and later as Director of Culture in Hå Municipality (1997-1980). From 1980 to 1987 he was Director of Information and Public Relations at the Strømme Foundation, Kristiansand. During this period he attended intercultural studies at Fuller Theological Seminary, Los Angeles USA. In 1987 he accepted the position of information director of Norwegian Santal Mission. Among others he specialized in the Norwegian Humanitarian Enterprise with a special interest in Azerbaijan and the theories linking ancient Scandinavia and Azerbaijan, as propounded by Thor Heyerdahl. In Azerbaijan he initiated the Kish project in Sheki and other cross-cultural projects between Norwegian artists and Azerbaijani artists.

== Thor Heyerdahl ==
Wegge initiated a 1997 musical album involving the Norwegian choir SKRUK and Azeri musicians and singers. The enthusiasm with regards to Dr. Heyerdahl's theory is explicitly stated in the album's title: The Land We Came From, with the choir's leader stating that Azerbaijan (Caucasus-Albania) was "a culture that may be our long-forgotten homeland". The album's cover featured a photograph of the ancient Caucasian Albanian church at Kish near Shäki.

The relevance of Kish church comes from J. Bjørnar Storfjell's archaeological excavation (also run by NHE and paid for by the help of Norwegian Government), which led Heyerdahl to make a short visit to the Kish church. The result was the appointment of Storfjell as chief archaeologist of a YUKOS-sponsored excavation to the Sea of Azov in 2001 to find evidence to back up Heyerdahl's Odin theory. Photographs of artefacts found during the Azov excavation appeared in Heyerdahl's 2001 book Jakten på Odin. På sporet av vår fortid (The Hunt for Odin. Examining our Past).

== Personal life ==
He hails from Tveit Municipality and resides in Oslo, is married and has three children. In his early years he played in the jazz band The Real Fake Band with Eyvind Skeie, among others.

== Bibliography ==
- Azerbaijan-Where East meets West (1996)
