= Tim A. Peters =

The Rev. Timothy A. Peters, an American humanitarian aid worker living in Seoul, South Korea, operates Helping Hands Korea. He is known for his advocacy of human rights in North Korea.

Peters originally came to Korea in 1975 and soon became an opponent of South Korea's military dictatorship. The military regime of President Chun Doo-hwan later expelled him from South Korea for handing out anti-government leaflets. He returned to South Korea in the late 1980s. Later, when North Korea's disfavored classes were struck by a famine that ultimately killed an estimated 2.5 million people, Peters established the Ton a Month Club to help feed the North Korean people. He founded Helping Hands Korea in 1996, and later became an activist in the "underground railroad," helping North Korean refugees to escape to South Korea or other countries via China. Peters claims to have personally participated in some of these clandestine missions inside China.

Peters was featured in the CNN documentary "Undercover in the Secret State" in 2005. He testified about human rights conditions facing North Korean refugees before the U.S. Congress in 2005, and was featured in a lengthy Time Asia article in 2006. His work has also been featured in numerous newspaper articles. By early 2006, Peters had become an outspoken critic of the UNHCR. Peters' public activism played a role in the U.S. decision to admit the first six North Korean refugees into the United States in May 2006.

In 2008, Peters was awarded the Stefanus Prize for his struggle for human rights and freedom of religion or belief.
