= Atila Emek =

Turkish politician

Member of the Grand National Assembly
- In office 3 November 2002 – 12 June 2011
- Constituency: Aydın (2002, 2007)

Vice-Chairman of the CHP responsible for legal and electoral affairs
- In office 18 August 2011 – 30 July 2012
- Leader: Kemal Kılıçdaroğlu
- Preceded by: Süheyl Batum
- Succeeded by: Bülent Tezcan

Personal details
- Born: 5 March 1947 (age 79) Kızılot, Antalya, Turkey
- Party: Republican People's Party (CHP)
- Education: Istanbul University
- Occupation: Politician and lawyer
- Profession: Law

Atila Emek (born 5 March 1947) is a Turkish lawyer, bureaucrat and politician from the Republican People's Party (CHP) who had served as the Member of Parliament for Antalya from November 2002 to June 2011.

Atila Kaya was appointed by Kemal Kılıçdaroğlu as the vice-chairman responsible for legal and electoral affairs on 18 August 2011.

== See also ==
- 22nd Parliament of Turkey
- 23rd Parliament of Turkey
