= Masikryong Ski Resort =

Ski resort in southeastern North Korea

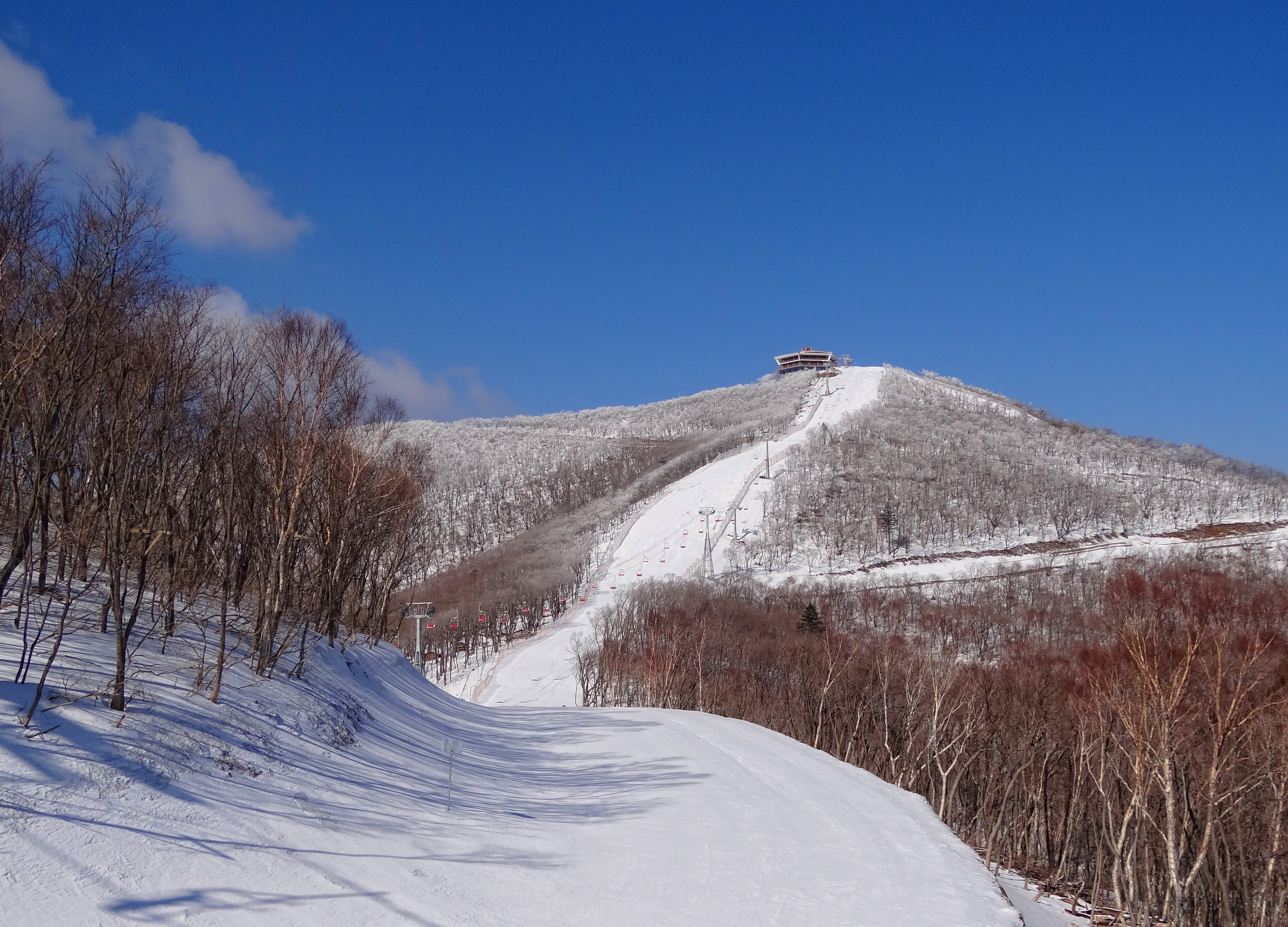
- Interactive map of Masikryong Ski Resort
- Location: Taehwa Peak, top station for the slopes
- Nearest city: Wonsan
- Coordinates: 39.0532°N 127.2500°E
- Top elevation: 1,360 m (4,460 ft)
- Base elevation: 768 m (2,520 ft)
- Trails: 9
- Longest run: 4.8 km (3 mi)
- Lift system: Chair and drag lifts
- Snowmaking: Snow cannons

- Masikryong Ski Resort
- Chosŏn'gŭl: 마식령스키장
- Hancha: 馬息嶺스키場
- Revised Romanization: Masingnyeong Seukijang
- McCune–Reischauer: Masingnyŏng Sŭk'ijang

Masikryong Ski Resort (Korean: 마식령 스키장) is a ski resort at the summit of the 1,360-metre (4,460 ft) Taehwa Peak (Korean: 대황산) some 20 kilometres (12 mi) outside Wonsan City in Kangwon Province, North Korea.

According to the official project plan, the first stage of the 2,430-square-kilometre (940 sq mi) development cost US$35,340,000 (£21 million; €25.5 million) and included construction of a luxury hotel, ice rink, swimming pool and restaurants. Official revenue forecasts suggest that 5,000 people will visit each day, generating an estimated annual income of $18,750,000 (£11.1 million; €13.5 million). The Masikryong (literally, "horse-resting pass") project was initiated by the North Korean government as part of a drive to "make people not only possess strong physiques and sound mentality, but also enjoy their sports and cultural lives in a world’s advanced condition (sic)."

Despite political tensions with neighbouring South Korea, leaders in the North hoped to host some events at the 2018 Winter Olympics. Constructed in just ten months, North Korea's first public ski resort was part of a drive by leader Kim Jong Un to increase foreign tourist numbers from 200,000 to 1 million per annum by 2016.

== Local environment ==
The limestone and gneiss Masikryong range runs 150 kilometres (93 mi) from Chorwon County in the southwest to the northeast corner of Kangwon Province with average heights of 800 to 1,500 metres (2,600 to 4,900 ft). A gentle slope on the western side of the ridge contrasts with a sharp descent to the east.

The area is home to a wide variety of deciduous trees including oak and lime. Average annual temperatures are 10.4 °C (50.7 °F) with an average of −3.6 °C (25.5 °F) in January and 22.5 °C (72.5 °F) in July. It snows on the ridge from mid-November until early April.

== Facilities ==
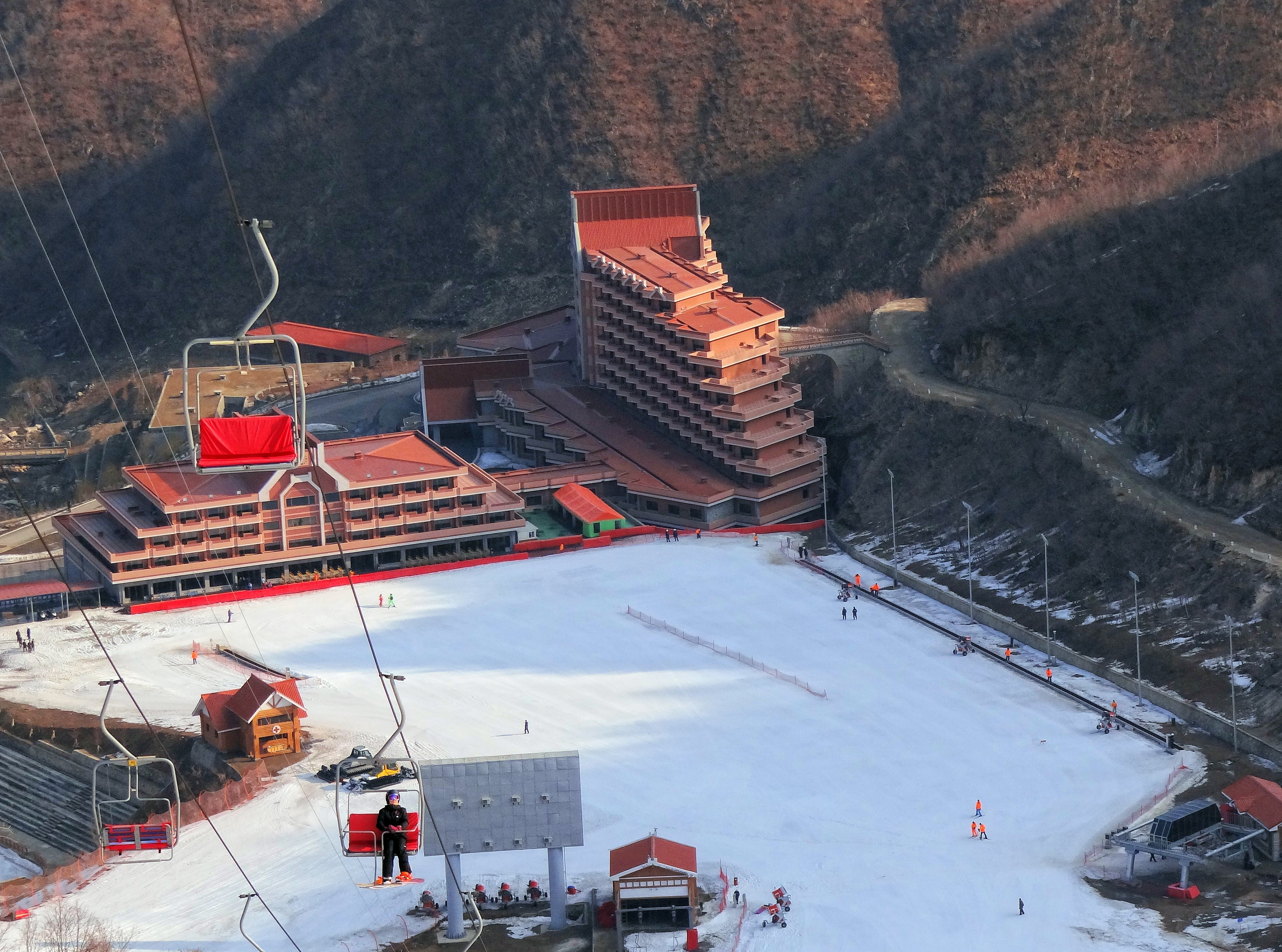
The hotel at the Masikryong Ski Resort.

Along with nine beginner to intermediate level pistes, the site includes a ski school and kindergarten as well as a children's snow park. The on-resort Masikryong Hotel has a swimming pool and sauna, massage room, beauty parlour, billiards room, restaurants and an ice-skating rink. There is also a helipad across from the hotel.

Designed by the Pyongyang Architectural Institute, the 120-room hotel has twin pyramidal towers with the taller of the two having nine floors. Conversion of the Kalma airforce base in nearby Wonsan into an international airport is underway as part of plans to create a special tourism area with the Masikryong resort as a major attraction.

== Cultural impact ==
Soldiers of the Korean People’s Army constructed the resort in only 10 months, giving rise to the new slogan "Masikryong speed", which has become a symbol of national pride as well as a propaganda device. The Daily Telegraph observed that "Masikryong speed" is a throwback to the Stakhanovite Chollima Movement introduced by former North Korean leader Kim Il Sung following the Korean War (1950–1953).

== Controversy ==
A US$7.5 million (£4.5 million; €5.5 million) deal with a Swiss ski-lift manufacturer was blocked in August 2013 after the country's government issued a directive based on United Nations Security Council Resolution 2094, itself a response to North Korea’s January 2013 nuclear test, that prohibited export sales of “installations for infrastructure and equipment for sports facilities with a luxury character.” A spokesperson from Switzerland’s State Secretariat for Economic Affairs (Seco) described the resort as a “prestigious propaganda project for the [North Korean] regime.” The Korean Central News Agency responded with a statement saying: "This is an intolerable mockery of the social system and the people of the DPRK and a serious human rights abuse that politicizes sports and discriminates against the Koreans."

The resort opened the same year, featuring a 30-year-old Austrian-made gondola lift, retired from Ischgl, that China supplied to North Korea. China's interpretation of the international sanctions excludes ski resorts from the banned "luxury" category.

== See also ==
- Tourism in North Korea
