= Mine Yıldırım =

Turkish human rights and religious freedom scholar

Mine Yıldırım is a scholar of human rights law and Turkey's leading expert on international protection of religious freedom. She is the founder of the Freedom of Belief Initiative, established in 2011 as the first permanent Turkish human rights organization specializing in freedom of religion or belief. Yildirim has also served as a consultant for Turkey's Education Reform Initiative on compulsory religious education in light of Turkey's human rights obligations. Her academic and policy work covers different facets of religious freedom, including conscientious objection to military service, accommodation of faith in workplaces, and restitution of religious minority properties.

== Education ==
Yıldırım received her bachelor's degree in International Relations from Marmara University, Istanbul, and her master's degree in Human Rights and Civil Liberties from the University of Leicester in the United Kingdom. She received her PhD from Finland's Åbo Akademi University in 2015, with her dissertation titled The Collective Dimension of Freedom of Religion or Belief in International Law: The Application of Findings to the Case of Turkey. She later worked at the same university's Institute of Human Rights as a post-doctoral researcher.

== Publications ==
Yıldırım is the co-editor of the volume Freedom of Religion and Belief in Turkey, a comprehensive study of religious freedom issues in Turkey. She is also a regular contributor to Forum 18 New Service and independent press agency Bianet.

== Awards ==
In 2016, Yıldırım was awarded the Stefanus Prize for her struggle for human rights and freedom of religion or belief.
