= Aiman Umarova =

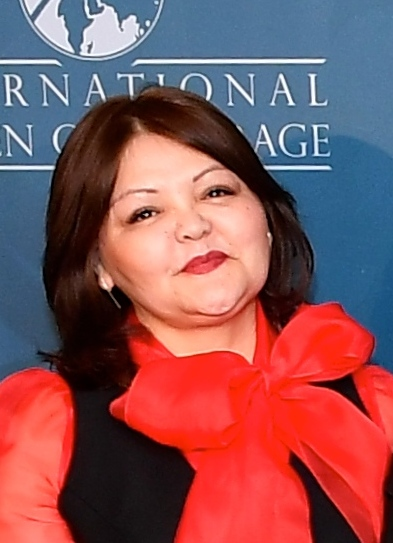
Image of Aiman Umarova

Aiman Umarova (Kazakh: Айман Омарова) is a Kazakh human rights lawyer. She received the International Women of Courage Award in 2018.
