= Volkan Canalioğlu =

Turkish politician

Personal details
- Born: 1 May 1950 (age 75); Trabzon Province, Turkey
- Political party: Republican People's Party (2004–2014)
- Spouse: Nermin Canalioğlu

Mehmet Volkan Canalioğlu (born 1 May 1950) is a Turkish politician who served as mayor of Trabzon from 2004 to 2009.

In 2009, he became the Mayoral candidate of the Republican People's Party (CHP) in Trabzon. Although he was successful in his campaign, he was ineligible to serve a further term as Mayor.

== Biography ==
Volkan was born in Trabzon - Hizirbey (Sotka), studied in Kaledibi primary school, Karma primary school and Trabzon High School. After he graduated from Black Sea Technical University In 1971, he started his teaching career in 1972.

In 1975, while still working as a teacher, he joined the army. He then resumed his teaching career after he finished his job as a soldier in Isparta. He worked at Trabzon Karma Primary School, Trabzon Industrial Professional High School Erzurum, Poet Nafi Primary School and Mustafa Necati Primary school as a teacher and a deputy manager. He was chosen to be a deputy manager of Trabzon Ministry of National Education while still working as a manager at Trabzon Derecik Primary school in 1983.

In 1985, he became the manager of Trabzon's Culture and Tourism department and later, the manager of Trabzon's Ministry of Tourism In 1989. He worked as vice governor in Trabzon 3 period and later elected as Mayor of Trabzon. In 2009, he couldn't be elected and since 2009, Orhan Fevzi Gümrükçüoğlu has served as a mayor in Trabzon.

== Awards ==
- 1970 Trabzon Tradition Awards
- 1972 Yenigün Newspaper Amateur Sportsman of Year
- 2000 The best manager and director

== Membership ==
- Black Sea Technical University Aware - founder member,
- Great Süleyman Aware - founder member,
- Tourism Aware,
- Trabzon High School's old students association,
- Tourism association - manager,
- Trabzon handicapped children protect association,
- leucemiad children protect association - manager member,
- Trabzon Sportif Club - member of management,
- Turkey Ministry of Youth and Sport,
