= Citrus (disambiguation) =

Citrus is a genus of flowering plants including the orange and lemon.

Citrus may also refer to:

== Places in the United States ==
- Citrus, California, a census-designated place in Los Angeles County
- Kearsarge, California, formerly named Citrus
- Citrus College, a community college located in Glendora, California
- Citrus County, Florida

== Other uses ==
- Citrus (album), a 2006 album by shoegazing band Asobi Seksu
- Citrus Project, a multilingual programming environment
- AirTran Airways (call sign Citrus), a former US airline
- Citrus (manga), a yuri manga by Saburouta
- Citrus (titular see), a titular see of the Roman Catholic Church
- Citrus Leisure, a Sri Lankan hotel chain
- Tetraclinis (known as citrus in antiquity), a North African species of cypresslike tree
- USCGC Citrus, a cutter ship previously employed by the US Coast Guard
