= Colombo Land and Development Company =

Sri Lankan property development company

Colombo Land and Development Company PLC
- Type: Public
- Traded as: CSE: CLND.N0000
- ISIN: LK0050N00001
- Industry: Real Estate and Retail Industry
- Founded: 8 December 1981; 44 years ago
- Headquarters: Colombo, Sri Lanka
- Key people: Asoka Weerasooriya (Chairman - Independent Non Executive Director); P S Weerasekera (Executive Director/Group CEO)
- Revenue: ▲LKR 339.16 million (2023)
- Operating income: ▼LKR 223 million (2023)
- Net income: ▼LKR 731 million (2023)
- Total assets: ▲LKR 13,306 billion (2023)
- Total equity: ▼LKR 7,992 billion (2023)
- Owners: E. G. Ng (23.709%); Hikkaduwa Beach Resort PLC (20.219%); Urban Development Authority of Sri Lanka (17.447%); Bank of Ceylon/Ceybank Unit Trust (9.453%)
- Number of employees: 35
- Subsidiaries: Liberty Developers; Liberty Holdings; Agri Spice (Pvt) Ltd.
- Website: colomboland.com

Colombo Land and Development Company PLC (CLDC) is a Sri Lankan property development and holding company involved in mixed development projects in the real estate and retail sector. Established on 8 December 1981, CLDC was subsequently listed on the Colombo Stock Exchange on 19 March 1986. The company is the developer and the owner of Liberty Plaza, Colombo.

The company's principal activities encompass the development and leasing of investment properties, particularly at Liberty Plaza. Additionally, CLDC manages vehicle car parks at both Liberty Plaza and Pettah locations.

== Operations ==
CLDC's primary activities include the development and leasing of investment properties. Notably, Liberty Plaza serves as a flagship project, reflecting the company's ability to sustain the relevance of the mall through expansion, modernisation, and diversification of retail brands and tenants. The group currently holds 83 shops, 10 offices, and apartments at Liberty Plaza, covering over 16,400 m^{2} (176,000 sq ft). Additionally, CLDC owns and manages five levels of car park operations at the complex, accommodating over 250 cars and 100 motorcycles.

== Leadership ==
CLDC's leadership comprises Asoka Weerasooriya (chairman - independent non-executive director) and P. S. Weerasekera (executive director/group CEO). Notably, Dilith Jayaweera, a non-executive director, stepped down in September 2023 upon entering politics. His departure extended to other directorial roles in Citrus Leisure PLC, Waskaduwa Beach Resort PLC, and Hikkaduwa Beach Resort PLC.

== Investment properties ==
=== Liberty Plaza ===
CLDC's flagship project, Liberty Plaza, covers 16,400 m^{2} (176,000 sq ft), hosting 83 shops, 10 offices, and apartments.

=== Gasland Car Park ===
Situated in the heart of Colombo, Gasland Car Park serves as a vital distribution hub primarily used by traders for goods transported into the city via lorries and container trucks. Covering nearly 1.2 ha (3 acres), Gasland Car Park represents one of the highest-value investment properties within CLDC's portfolio.

=== People’s Car Park ===
Located atop the People's Park shopping complex, the People's Car Park underwent a refurbishment in 2021. With 185 vehicle parking bays and 80 motorcycle bays, the car park now features a newly built roof equipped with solar power panels, establishing it as a renewable energy source for the entire complex.

=== Agri Spice ===
Its fully owned subsidiary, Agri Spice (Pvt) Ltd., operates a 41 ha (102 acres) plantation in Avissawella cultivating Mahogany, Rubber, and Alstoniya.

== See also ==
- List of companies listed on the Colombo Stock Exchange
