= List of John Monash Scholars =

List of recipients of the John Monash Scholarship

This is a list of John Monash Scholars, recipients of the John Monash Scholarship, a prestigious postgraduate scholarship awarded to outstanding Australians with leadership potential who wish to study at any university overseas. The scholarship program was established in 2004 by the General Sir John Monash Foundation.

As of 2026, 299 scholarships have been awarded. Recipients study at leading universities worldwide including Oxford, Cambridge, Harvard, MIT, Stanford, and many others, across diverse fields including medicine, law, engineering, science, arts, and public policy.

== Scholars by year ==
Scholars are listed alphabetically by surname within each year. All data verified via the General Sir John Monash Foundation scholars database.

=== 2004 (8 scholars) ===
Name	Field	Degree	University	Scholarship Type
Dr Jacqueline Baker	International Relations, Political Science & Policy Studies	Master of Science in Social Anthropology / Doctor of Philosophy in Comparative Government	London School of Economics, United Kingdom	General
Prof Jean-Paul Carvalho	Business & Economics, Political Science & Policy Studies	Doctor & Master of Philosophy in Economics	University of Oxford, United Kingdom	General
Dr Tom Hanna	Business & Economics, Physics & Maths	Doctor of Philosophy	University of Oxford, United Kingdom	General
Dr Aimee Heuzenroeder	Arts, Society & Culture, Language & Literature	Doctor of Philosophy	University of Cambridge, United Kingdom	General
Dr Jacqueline Mowbray	Law, Political Science & Policy Studies	Doctor of Philosophy	University of Cambridge, United Kingdom	General
Lara Olsen	Business & Economics, Environment & Sustainability	Master of Business Administration	INSEAD Fountainebleau, France	General
Dr Kath Rock	Information Technology & AI, Law	Doctor of Philosophy	University of Oxford, United Kingdom	General
Dr Danielle Roosa	International Relations, Law	Masters of International Law	Harvard University, United States of America	General

=== 2005 (7 scholars) ===
Name	Field	Degree	University	Scholarship Type
A/Prof Matt Baker	Biological Science, Physics & Maths	Doctor of Philosophy	University of Oxford, United Kingdom	General
Prof Katherine Daniell	Environment & Sustainability, Political Science & Policy Studies	Doctor of Philosophy	AgroParisTech, France	General
Dr Ben Etherington	Arts, Society & Culture, Language & Literature	Doctor of Philosophy	University of Cambridge, United Kingdom	General
Andrew Hudson	International Relations, Law	Master of Laws	New York University, United States of America	General
Dr Sarah Milne	Environment & Sustainability, Political Science & Policy Studies	Doctor of Philosophy	University of Cambridge, United Kingdom	General
Dr Olivia Oliver-Thorne	Engineering, Environment & Sustainability	Doctor of Philosophy	University of Cambridge, United Kingdom	General
Prof Cathy Vaughan	Public Health	Doctor of Philosophy	London School of Economics, United Kingdom	General

=== 2006 (8 scholars) ===
Name	Field	Degree	University	Scholarship Type
Dr Hsien Herbert Chan	Medical Studies	Doctor of Philosophy	University of Oxford, United Kingdom	General
Prof Mark Dawson	Biomedical Science, Medical Studies	Doctor of Philosophy	University of Cambridge, United Kingdom	General
A/Prof Kate Manne	Arts, Society & Culture, Philosophy & Religious Studies	Doctor of Philosophy	Massachusetts Institute of Technology, United States of America	General
Prof Justin Moore	Medical Studies	Doctor of Philosophy	University of Oxford, United Kingdom	General
Dr Aruna Sathanapally	Law, Political Science & Policy Studies	Master of Philosophy in Law	University of Oxford, United Kingdom	General
Dr Sally Thompson	Engineering, Environment & Sustainability	Doctor of Philosophy	Duke University, United States of America	General
Prof Tim Trudgian	Physics & Maths	Doctor of Philosophy	University of Oxford, United Kingdom	General
Dr Bridget Vincent	Arts, Society & Culture, Language & Literature	Doctor of Philosophy	University of Cambridge, United Kingdom	General

=== 2007 (7 scholars) ===
Name	Field	Degree	University	Scholarship Type
Dr Jeremy Bell	Arts, Society & Culture, Philosophy & Religious Studies	Doctor of Philosophy	University of Chicago, United States of America	General
David Clarke	Business & Economics, Political Science & Policy Studies	Master of Public Administration	Harvard University, United States of America	General
A/Prof Rosie Dawkins	Biomedical Science, Medical Studies	Master of Public Health	Harvard University, United States of America	General
Dr Kirsty Kuo	Engineering, Environment & Sustainability	Doctor of Philosophy	University of Cambridge, United Kingdom	General
Prof Gemma Sharp	Medical Studies, Behavioural Science	Masters in Oncology	University of Cambridge, United Kingdom	General
A/Prof Owen Siggs	Biomedical Science, Medical Studies	Doctor of Philosophy	University of Oxford, United Kingdom	General
A/Prof Joe Suttie	Medical Studies	Doctor of Philosophy	University of Oxford, United Kingdom	General

=== 2008 (8 scholars) ===
Name	Field	Degree	University	Scholarship Type
Dr Alice Chang	Medical Studies, Public Health	Master of Philosophy in Public Health	University of Cambridge, United Kingdom	General
Dr Johnathon Ehsani	Medical Studies, Public Health	Doctor of Philosophy	University of Michigan, United States of America	General
Hugh Evans	International Relations, Political Science & Policy Studies	Master of Philosophy in International Relations	University of Cambridge, United Kingdom	General
David Hume	Law	Master of Laws	Harvard University, United States of America	General
Dr Dilani Kahawala	Information Technology & AI, Physics & Maths	Doctor of Philosophy	Harvard University, United States of America	General
Dr Brendan Lim	Law	Master of Laws/Juris Doctor	Yale University, United States of America	General
Maj Gen Roger Noble	Defence, Political Science & Policy Studies	Master of International Public Policy	Johns Hopkins University, United States of America	General
Frances Voon	International Relations, Law	Master of Philosophy in Development Studies	University of Oxford, United Kingdom	General

=== 2009 (8 scholars) ===
Name	Field	Degree	University	Scholarship Type
Prof James Daniell	Engineering, Environment & Sustainability	Doctor of Philosophy in Engineering	Karlsruhe Institute of Technology, Germany	General
A/Prof Amy McLennan	Arts, Society & Culture, Public Health	Doctor of Philosophy	University of Oxford, United Kingdom	General
Dr Sarah Meyer	Public Health, International Relations	Doctor of Philosophy	Johns Hopkins University, United States of America	General
Dr Rebecca Nelson	Environment & Sustainability, Law	Master of the Science of Law (JSM)	Stanford University, United States of America	General
Dr Tim O'Shea	Engineering, Biomedical Science	Doctor of Philosophy	Harvard University	General
Dr Katie Quinn	Engineering, Biomedical Science	Doctor of Philosophy	Massachusetts Institute of Technology, United States of America	General
Dr Mark Schembri	Medical Studies, Public Health	Master of Public Health	Harvard University, United States of America	General
Dr Shaun Yow	Business & Economics	Doctor of Philosophy	London School of Economics, United Kingdom	General

=== 2010 (8 scholars) ===
Name	Field	Degree	University	Scholarship Type
Dr Nikki Bart	Medical Studies	Doctor of Philosophy in Physiology, Anatomy and Genetics	University of Oxford, United Kingdom	Pratt Foundation
Dr Phoebe Downing	Education Studies, International Relations	Doctor of Philosophy	University of Oxford, United Kingdom	General
Dr Joe Gattas	Architecture & Built Environment, Engineering	Doctor of Philosophy	University of Oxford, United Kingdom	General
Zelie Heger	Law	Master of Laws	University of Cambridge, United Kingdom	General
Dr Jonathan Kummerfeld	Information Technology & AI	Doctor of Philosophy	University of California, Berkeley, United States of America	General
Sylvia Lockyer	Public Health	Master of Public Health	University of Otago, New Zealand	General
Catherine Stubberfield	International Relations, Law	Masters in Human Rights and Democratisation	European Inter-University Centre for Human Rights and Democratisation (EIUC)	General
Dr Sam Wills	Business & Economics	Doctor of Philosophy	University of Oxford, United Kingdom	General

=== 2011 (8 scholars) ===
Name	Field	Degree	University	Scholarship Type
Dr Melanie Bannister-Tyrrell	Medical Studies, Public Health	Masters in Public Health	London School of Hygiene & Tropical Medicine, United Kingdom	General
Dr Tom Cundy	Medical Studies	Doctor of Philosophy	Imperial College London, United Kingdom	General
Prof Jodi Gardner	Law	Doctor of Philosophy	University of Oxford, United Kingdom	General
Laura Grant	International Relations, Political Science & Policy Studies	Masters in Peace and Conflict Studies	Uppsala University, Sweden	General
A/Prof Davis McCarthy	Biomedical Science, Physics & Maths	Doctor of Philosophy	University of Oxford, United Kingdom	General
Alison O'Connor	Arts, Society & Culture, Political Science & Policy Studies	Master of Science	University of Oxford, United Kingdom	General
Anna Rakoczy	Business & Economics	Master of the Science of Law (JSM)	Stanford University, United States of America	General
Dr David Smerdon	Business & Economics, Political Science & Policy Studies	Doctor of Philosophy	Tinbergen Institute, Netherlands	General

=== 2012 (9 scholars) ===
Name	Field	Degree	University	Scholarship Type
Dr Sam Brophy-Williams	Medical Studies, Public Health	Master of Public Health	Harvard University, United States of America	General
Anita George	Law, Political Science & Policy Studies	Master of Public Administration	Sciences Po Paris, France	General
Madeline Gleeson	Law, Political Science & Policy Studies	Masters of International Law	Graduate Institute of International and Development Studies, Switzerland	General
A/Prof Fergus Green	Environment & Sustainability, Political Science & Policy Studies	Master of Research in Political Science / Doctor of Philosophy in Political Theory	London School of Economics, United Kingdom	General
Kate Griffiths	Environment & Sustainability, Political Science & Policy Studies	Masters in Biodiversity, Conservation & Management	University of Oxford, United Kingdom	Origin Foundation
Dr Ashley Kingsborough	Engineering, Environment & Sustainability	Doctor of Philosophy	University of Oxford, United Kingdom	General
Christopher Lowe	Defence, Engineering	Master of Science in Aerospace, Aeronautical and Astronautical Engineering	Massachusetts Institute of Technology, United States of America	Origin Foundation
Claudia Newman-Martin	Business & Economics, Law	Master of Public Policy	Harvard University, United States of America	General
Iwan Walters	Business & Economics, Education Studies	Masters in Education / Master of Public Policy	University of Oxford, United Kingdom	General

=== 2013 (10 scholars) ===
Name	Field	Degree	University	Scholarship Type
Dr Alexander Barbaro	Defence, Physics & Maths	Doctor of Philosophy	University of Oxford, United Kingdom	Zelman Cowen
Dr Sarah Bourke	Arts, Society & Culture, Medical Studies	Master of Philosophy in Medical Anthropology	University of Oxford, United Kingdom	BHP
Jessica Denniss	Language & Literature	Doctor of Philosophy	University of Toronto, Canada	Australian Universities'
Jillian Kilby	Business & Economics, Engineering	Master of Business Administration / Master of Public Policy	Stanford University, United States of America	BHP
Dr Kate Mitchell	Law, Political Science & Policy Studies	Doctor of Philosophy	University of Oxford, United Kingdom	Zelman Cowen
Dr Alexandra Phelan	Public Health, Law	Doctor of Juridical Science (SJD)	Georgetown University, United States of America	Pratt Foundation
Huw Pohlner	Environment & Sustainability, Political Science & Policy Studies	Master of Philosophy in Geography and the Environment	University of Oxford, United Kingdom	General
Stephanie Pow	Political Science & Policy Studies	Master of Public Administration -International Development / Master of Business Administration	Harvard University	NSW Premier's
Dr Kate Smith	Engineering, Environment & Sustainability	Master of Environmental Science and Engineering	Tsinghua University, China	Origin Foundation
Cavin Wilson	Business & Economics, Environment & Sustainability	Master of Philosophy in Economics	University of Cambridge, United Kingdom	Chairman's Circle

=== 2014 (15 scholars) ===
Name	Field	Degree	University	Scholarship Type
Dr Fernando do Campo	Creative Arts	Masters in Fine Arts	Parsons New School, United States of America	Australian Cultural
Dr Catherine Drummond	Law	Master of Laws	University of Cambridge, United Kingdom	Chairman's Circle
Bridget Healy	Business & Economics	Master of Public Administration	INSEAD Fountainebleau	Woodside
Dr James Kwiecinski	Physics & Maths	Doctor of Philosophy	University of Oxford, United Kingdom	Zelman Cowen
Sarah Lux-Lee	Education Studies, Political Science & Policy Studies	Master of Public Administration	Columbia University, United States of America	Chairman's Circle
Dr Genevieve Martin	Medical Studies	Doctor of Philosophy in Clinical Medicine	University of Oxford, United Kingdom	Wesfarmers
Dr Emma McIntosh	Environment & Sustainability, Political Science & Policy Studies	Doctor of Philosophy in Geography and the Environment	University of Oxford, United Kingdom	BHP
Alexa Morcombe	Business & Economics	Executive Master of Public Administration	INSEAD Singapore, Singapore	Woodside
Dr Ben Mylius	Environment & Sustainability, Political Science & Policy Studies	Master of Laws / Doctor of Philosophy in Political Philosophy	Columbia University	Murray-Darling Basin Authority
Dr Kumaran Nathan	Engineering, Environment & Sustainability	Doctor of Philosophy in Engineering	University of Cambridge, United Kingdom	Origin Foundation
Dr Kathryn Roberts Parker	Language & Literature, Performing Arts	Masters in English Language, Literature and Letters	King's College London, United Kingdom	Australian Cultural
Alexandra Readhead	Business & Economics, Political Science & Policy Studies	Master of Public Policy	University of Oxford, United Kingdom	BHP
Jim Round	Business & Economics, Political Science & Policy Studies	Master of Research (Economics)	London School of Economics, United Kingdom	Australian Universities'
May Samali	Business & Economics	Master of Public Policy	Harvard University, United States of America	NSW Premier's
Chelsea Tabart	Law, Political Science & Policy Studies	Master of Public Policy	University of Oxford, United Kingdom	Zelman Cowen

=== 2015 (14 scholars) ===
Name	Field	Degree	University	Scholarship Type
Dr Lydia Braunack-Mayer	Public Health, Physics & Maths	Master of Science in Statistics	ETH Zurich, Switzerland	Commonwealth Bank
Dr Victoria Cox	Medical Studies, Public Health	Master of Philosophy in Evidence Based Intervention & Policy Evaluation	University of Oxford, United Kingdom	Chairman's Circle
Claire Daniel	Architecture & Built Environment, Information Technology & AI	Master of Science	University College London, United Kingdom	Commonwealth Bank
Dr Laura Diment	Engineering, Biomedical Science	Doctor of Philosophy	University of Oxford, United Kingdom	Australian Universities'
Grace Keesing	Law	Bachelor of Civil Law	New York University, United States of America	Zelman Cowen
Dr Dylan Morris	Medical Studies	Doctor of Philosophy	University of Oxford, United Kingdom	Zelman Cowen
Dr Jack Muir	Environment & Sustainability, Physics & Maths	Doctor of Philosophy	California Institute of Technology (Caltech), United States of America	Origin Foundation
Dr Brent O'Carrigan	Biomedical Science, Medical Studies	Doctor of Philosophy	University of Cambridge, United Kingdom	NSW Premier's
Hugh Passmore	Business & Economics, Political Science & Policy Studies	Master of Public Policy	Harvard University, United States of America	Roth/Segal
Macushla Robinson	Arts, Society & Culture, Creative Arts	Master of Fine Art	Parsons New School, United States of America	Myer Foundation
Alies Sluiter	Creative Arts, Performing Arts	Master of Fine Arts	Columbia University, United States of America	Australian Cultural
Dr Lauren Ward	Engineering, Biomedical Science	Doctor of Philosophy	University of Salford, United Kingdom	BHP
Dr Phoebe Williams	Medical Studies	Doctor of Philosophy	University of Oxford, United Kingdom	ANZAC Centenary
Tom Williams	Business & Economics	Global Executive Master of Business Administration	China Europe International Business School (CEIBS), China	Woodside

=== 2016 (17 scholars) ===
Name	Field	Degree	University	Scholarship Type
Dr Arjuna Dibley	Environment & Sustainability, Law	Doctor of Science of Law	Stanford University, United States of America	Woodside
Stephen Dietz	International Relations, Law	Master of Laws	Columbia University, United States of America	Susan and Isaac Wakil Foundation
Giles Dunseath-Hamilton	Business & Economics, Environment & Sustainability	Master of Science in Economics, Policy of Energy and the Environment	University of Oxford, United Kingdom	Chairman's Circle
Reuben Finighan	Business & Economics, Political Science & Policy Studies	Doctor of Philosophy	London School of Economics, United Kingdom	Commonwealth Bank
Dr Andrew Frampton	Performing Arts	Doctor of Philosophy	University of Oxford, United Kingdom	Australian Universities'
Michael Grebla	Performing Arts	Masters of Music Composition	New England Conservatory of Music, United States of America	Zelman Cowen
Dr Eloise Hamilton	Physics & Maths	Doctor of Philosophy	University of Oxford, United Kingdom	BHP
Dr Emma Howard	Environment & Sustainability, Physics & Maths	Doctor of Philosophy in Geography and the Environment	University of Oxford, United Kingdom	Origin Foundation
Timothy James-Matthews	International Relations, Law	Master of Laws	University of Cambridge, United Kingdom	Zelman Cowen
Katherine Mansted	Defence, Political Science & Policy Studies	Master of Public Policy	Harvard University, United States of America	Roth/Segal
Abigael Mawby	International Relations, Law	Master of Laws	Columbia University, United States of America	Chairman's Circle
Harriet Mercer	Arts, Society & Culture	Doctor of Philosophy	University of Oxford, United Kingdom	ANZAC Centenary
Anirudh Mukkavilli	Business & Economics, Environment & Sustainability	Master of Public Administration	INSEAD Fountainebleau	Woodside
Jacqueline Pitt	Law	Master of Laws	Columbia University, United States of America	Zelman Cowen
Prof Harrison Steel	Engineering, Biological Science	Doctor of Philosophy	University of Oxford, United Kingdom	Roden Cutler NSW
Samuel Williams	Creative Arts, Language & Literature	Doctor of Philosophy	University of Cambridge, United Kingdom	Australian Cultural
Sasha Zegenhagen	Business & Economics, Public Health	Master of Science in Health Policy, Planning and Financing	London School of Hygiene & Tropical Medicine, United Kingdom	Susan and Isaac Wakil Foundation

=== 2017 (20 scholars) ===
Name	Field	Degree	University	Scholarship Type
Dr Maja Arsic	Environment & Sustainability, Biological Science	Doctor of Philosophy	University of Copenhagen, Denmark	BHP
Hannah Barber	Education Studies, Political Science & Policy Studies	Master of Education	Harvard University, United States of America	Roth/Segal
Dr Damon Binder	Physics & Maths	Doctor of Philosophy	Princeton University, United States of America	Chairman's Circle
Dr Mark Brooke	Medical Studies, Information Technology & AI	Doctor of Philosophy	University of Oxford, United Kingdom	Ian Potter Foundation
Dr Timothy Delport	Engineering, Environment & Sustainability	Doctor of Philosophy	University of Oxford, United Kingdom	Wesfarmers
Dr Garang Dut	Medical Studies, Public Health	Master of Public Health	Harvard University, United States of America	Roth/Segal
Dr Katherine Franklin	Medical Studies, Public Health	Master of Science	University of Oxford, United Kingdom	Zelman Cowen
Dr Vafa Ghazavi	Business & Economics, Political Science & Policy Studies	Doctor of Philosophy in Public Policy	University of Oxford, United Kingdom	Commonwealth Bank
Miranda Gronow	Arts, Society & Culture	Master of Philosophy in Classical Archaeology	University of Oxford, United Kingdom	ANZAC Centenary
Bridget Hickey	Arts, Society & Culture	Master of Science (Journalism)	Columbia University, United States of America	Zelman Cowen
Dr Ling San Lau	Medical Studies, Public Health	Master of Public Health	Columbia University, United States of America	Helen and Michael Gannon
Dr Arlie McCarthy	Environment & Sustainability, Biological Science	Doctor of Philosophy in Zoology	University of Cambridge, United Kingdom	David Turner
Dr Brett Parkinson	Engineering, Environment & Sustainability	Doctor of Philosophy	Imperial College London, United Kingdom	Woodside
Dr Catherine Richards	Engineering, Environment & Sustainability	Doctor of Philosophy in Engineering	University of Cambridge, United Kingdom	Origin Foundation
Dr Martin Seneviratne	Public Health, Information Technology & AI	Master of Science	Stanford University, United States of America	Roden Cutler NSW
Mark Shelton	Business & Economics, Information Technology & AI	Master of Science	Stanford University, United States of America	Zelman Cowen
Zulpha Styer	Law, Political Science & Policy Studies	Master of Public Administration	Columbia University, United States of America	Australian Universities'
Dr Trung Ton	Defence, Public Health	Master of Business Administration	University of Oxford, United Kingdom	Susan and Isaac Wakil Foundation
Dr Ida Whiteman	Medical Studies, Public Health	Master of Science in International Health and Tropical Medicine	University of Oxford, United Kingdom	Helen and Michael Gannon
Shevaun Wright	Creative Arts, Law	Master of Fine Arts (Art & Law)	University of California, Los Angeles, United States of America	Australian Cultural

=== 2018 (18 scholars) ===
Name	Field	Degree	University	Scholarship Type
Nicola Bilton	Defence, Physics & Maths	Doctor of Philosophy in Physics	Imperial College London, United Kingdom	BHP
Amy Burton	Law	Master of Laws	Georgetown University, United States of America	Zelman Cowen
James Campbell	International Relations, Law	Master of Laws	University of California, Berkeley, United States of America	Victorian Government
Ryan Carters	Political Science & Policy Studies	Master of Public Policy	Harvard University, United States of America	Roth/Segal
Dr Jarrah Dale	Environment & Sustainability, Biological Science	Doctor of Philosophy in Zoology	University of Oxford, United Kingdom	Chairman's Circle
Amy Dennison	Environment & Sustainability, Law	Master Liberal Arts (Sustainability)	Harvard University, United States of America	Woodside
Felix Donovan	Education Studies, Political Science & Policy Studies	Master of Public Policy	University of Oxford, United Kingdom	Roden Cutler NSW
Dr Jordan English	Law	Bachelor of Civil Law	University of Oxford, United Kingdom	Zelman Cowen
Dr Steven Ettema	Engineering, Environment & Sustainability	Doctor of Philosophy in Engineering Science	University of Oxford, United Kingdom	Woodside
Marianne Haines	Environment & Sustainability, Biological Science	Doctor of Philosophy in Geoscience	University of Calgary, Canada	Origin Foundation
Dr Ahmad Shah Idil	Engineering, Biomedical Science	Doctor of Philosophy in Medical Physics & Bioengineering	University College London, United Kingdom	Australian Universities'
Dr Nate Johnson	Defence, Engineering	Doctor of Philosophy in Computer Engineering	Arizona State University, United States of America	Pratt Foundation Commemorative Defence AAA
Dr Louis Klee	Creative Arts, Language & Literature	Doctor of Philosophy in English	University of Cambridge, United Kingdom	Australian Cultural
Sonia Loudon	Education Studies, Political Science & Policy Studies	Master of Education in Education Policy and Management	Harvard University, United States of America	Helen and Michael Gannon
Dr Heather Muir	Engineering, Physics & Maths	Doctor of Philosophy in Physics	University of Cambridge, United Kingdom	ANZAC Centenary
Brighid Sammon	Architecture & Built Environment, Environment & Sustainability	Master of Science in Urban Management and Development	Erasmus University Rotterdam, Netherlands	Susan and Isaac Wakil Foundation
Dr Kevin Tan	Medical Studies, Public Health	Master of Science	University of Copenhagen, Denmark	Susan and Isaac Wakil Foundation
Dr Will Witheridge	Business & Economics, International Relations	Doctor of Philosophy in Economics	New York University, United States of America	Commonwealth Bank

=== 2019 (17 scholars) ===
Name	Field	Degree	University	Scholarship Type
Dr Dustin Barter	International Relations, Political Science & Policy Studies	Doctor of Philosophy in Development Studies	University of Cambridge, United Kingdom	Australian Universities'
Zoe Bush	Environment & Sustainability, Law	Master of Laws	Columbia University, United States of America	Zelman Cowen
Melissa-Ann Gillies	Law, Political Science & Policy Studies	Master of Public Policy	Harvard University, United States of America	Roth/Segal
Freya Jansens	Business & Economics, Political Science & Policy Studies	Master of Public Administration	University of Oxford, United Kingdom	Roden Cutler NSW
Dr Brendan Jones	Biomedical Science, Medical Studies	Doctor of Philosophy in Regenerative Medicine	University College London, United Kingdom	Chairman's Circle
William Leben	Defence, Political Science & Policy Studies	Master of Philosophy in Development Studies	University of Oxford, United Kingdom	ANZAC Centenary
Alexander Makarowsky	Engineering, Environment & Sustainability	Master of Science in Mathematical Modelling and Scientific Computing	University of Oxford, United Kingdom	Commonwealth Bank
Dr William Mitchell	Medical Studies, Public Health	Master of Public Health	Harvard University, United States of America	Chairman's Circle
Minh-Quan Nguyen	Law	Bachelor of Civil Law	University of Oxford, United Kingdom	Australian Universities'
Sarah Schwartz	Law, Political Science & Policy Studies	Master of Laws	Harvard University, United States of America	Roden Cutler NSW
Jessie Smith	Defence, Law	Doctor of Philosophy in Law	University of Cambridge, United Kingdom	Susan and Isaac Wakil Foundation
Kay Song	Engineering, Environment & Sustainability	Doctor of Philosophy in Engineering Science	University of Oxford, United Kingdom	BHP
Dr Michaela Taylor-Williams	Biomedical Science, Physics & Maths	Doctor of Philosophy in Physics	University of Cambridge, United Kingdom	Woodside
Maris Tebecis	Environment & Sustainability, International Relations	Master of Science	London School of Economics, United Kingdom	Australian Universities'
Ashlee Uren	Law, Political Science & Policy Studies	Master of Laws	Georgetown University, United States of America	Commonwealth Bank
Hugh Utting	Architecture & Built Environment, Environment & Sustainability	Master of Philosophy in Planning, Growth and Regeneration	University of Cambridge, United Kingdom	Ian Potter Foundation
Dr Georgia Walker	Medical Studies, Public Health	Master of Tropical Medicine and International Health	London School of Hygiene & Tropical Medicine, United Kingdom	Helen and Michael Gannon

=== 2020 (20 scholars) ===
Name	Field	Degree	University	Scholarship Type
Dr Maria Bilal	Medical Studies, Public Health	Accelerated Master of Public Health	Harvard University, United States of America	Australian Universities'
Jonty Coy	Performing Arts	Master of Early Music	Royal Conservatoire of The Hague, Netherlands	Gandel Philanthropy
Chloe D'Souza	Law, Political Science & Policy Studies	Master of Laws	Harvard University, United States of America	Bob Hawke
Dr Alli Devlin	Engineering, Environment & Sustainability	Doctor of Philosophy in Engineering Science	University of Oxford, United Kingdom	Commonwealth Bank
Dr Nick Duddy	Language & Literature, Performing Arts	Doctor of Philosophy in English	University of Oxford, United Kingdom	Tim Fairfax AC
Brooke Greenwood	Law, Political Science & Policy Studies	Master of Laws	Harvard University, United States of America	Roden Cutler NSW
Jessie Hughes	Creative Arts, Information Technology & AI	Master in Screenwriting	London Film Academy, United Kingdom	Lee Liberman
Tom Jenkins	Engineering, Environment & Sustainability	Global Master of Public Administration	IE University Madrid, Spain	Wesfarmers
Tess Kelly	Public Health, Political Science & Policy Studies	Master of Public Administration	Harvard University, United States of America	Zelman Cowen
Rob Lean	Business & Economics	Master of Public Administration	University of Cambridge, United Kingdom	ANZAC Centenary
Dr Matthew Lennon	Biomedical Science, Medical Studies	Master of Neuroscience	University of Oxford, United Kingdom	Tim Fischer
Eva Mackinley	International Relations	Master of International Relations and Security Studies	University of Bradford, United Kingdom	Chairman's Circle
Dr Prashanti Manchikanti	Public Health, Political Science & Policy Studies	Master of Science Society and Health: Social Epidemiology	University College London, United Kingdom	Helen and Michael Gannon
Michael McGuire	Business & Economics, International Relations	Master of Public Administration	INSEAD Singapore, Singapore	Zelman Cowen
Dr Luke Milross	Biomedical Science, Medical Studies	Master of Research (Immunobiology)	Newcastle University, United Kingdom	Roden Cutler NSW
Ruth Moorman	Engineering, Environment & Sustainability	Doctor of Philosophy in Environmental Science and Engineering	California Institute of Technology (Caltech), United States of America	Australian Universities'
Ryan Parker	Physics & Maths	Doctor of Philosophy in Physics	University of Cambridge, United Kingdom	Chairman's Circle
Sam Parker	Engineering, Biomedical Science	Doctor of Philosophy in Biomedical Engineering	Brown University, United States of America	Susan and Isaac Wakil Foundation
Joel Paterson	Defence, International Relations	Master of International Security	Sciences Po Paris, France	Victorian Government
Dylan Sherman	Engineering, Environment & Sustainability	Doctor of Philosophy in Engineering Science	University of Oxford, United Kingdom	BHP

=== 2021 (13 scholars) ===
Name	Field	Degree	University	Scholarship Type
Lauren Bennett	Information Technology & AI,Biological Science	Doctor of Philosophy in Ecological Brain	University College London, United Kingdom	Judith Neilson Foundation (Sustainable Futures)
Dr Mark Chia	Medical Studies	Doctor of Philosophy in Ophthalmology	University College London, United Kingdom	Commonwealth Bank
Peter Clark	Performing Arts	Doctor of Musical Arts	City University of New York, United States of America	Judith Neilson Foundation (Social Cohesion and Innovation)
Jess Coldrey	Engineering, Environment & Sustainability	Master of Humanitarian Engineering with Management	University of Warwick, United Kingdom	Victorian Government
Alice Crawford	Law, Political Science & Policy Studies	Master of Public Administration	Harvard University, United States of America	Bob Hawke
Maj Amrinder Singh Ghuman	Defence, Engineering	Master of Business Administration	London Business School, United Kingdom	ANZAC Centenary
Bronte Gosper	Arts, Society & Culture, Creative Arts	Oral History Master of Arts	Columbia University, United States of America	Gandel Philanthropy
Dr Ashray Gunjur	Biomedical Science, Medical Studies	Doctor of Philosophy in Biological Science	University of Cambridge, United Kingdom	Helen and Michael Gannon
Hannah Phelps	Environment & Sustainability, Physics & Maths	Doctor of Philosophy in Atmospheric Science	University of British Columbia, Canada	Chairman's Circle
Emily Ragus	Arts, Society & Culture, Medical Studies	Doctor of Philosophy in Anthropology	University of Amsterdam, Netherlands	Judith Neilson Foundation (Cross Sectoral)
Holli Sargeant	Information Technology & AI, Law	Doctor of Philosophy in Law	University of Cambridge, United Kingdom	BHP
Dr Brett Shannon	Medical Studies, Public Health	Doctor of Philosophy in the Division of Environmental and Occupational Health Sciences	University of Illinois, United States of America	Australian Universities'
Daniel Yore	Education Studies, Political Science & Policy Studies	Master of Public Administration	University College London, United Kingdom	Tim Fischer

=== 2022 (18 scholars) ===
Name	Field	Degree	University	Scholarship Type
Dr Georgia Behrens	Medical Studies, Public Health	Master of Science in Public Health	London School of Hygiene & Tropical Medicine, United Kingdom	Roden Cutler NSW
Esther Carlin	Arts, Society & Culture, Creative Arts	Master of Art Practice	Ecole de Recherche Graphique, Belgium	Combined Arts
Dr Sean Carter	Biomedical Science, Medical Studies	Doctor of Philosophy in Management and Prevention of Preterm Birth	National University of Singapore, Singapore	Chairman's Circle
Dr Laura Dryburgh	Medical Studies, Public Health	Master of Public Policy	University of Oxford, United Kingdom	Chairman's Circle
Darcy Dunn-Lawless	Engineering, Biomedical Science	Doctor of Philosophy in Engineering Science	University of Oxford, United Kingdom	Australian Universities'
Mr Nicholas Fabbri	Political Science & Policy Studies	Master of Public Policy	University of Oxford, United Kingdom	Bob Hawke
Milan Gandhi	Law, Political Science & Policy Studies	Master of Public Policy / Master of Science	University of Oxford, United Kingdom	Lee Liberman
Hannah Gandy	Law	Master of Laws	University College London, United Kingdom	Victorian Government
Emma Garlett	Law	Master of Laws	University of Auckland, New Zealand	Wesfarmers
Dr Isabel Hanson	Medical Studies, Public Health	Doctor of Philosophy in Primary Care	University of Oxford, United Kingdom	BHP
Cassandra Joore-Short	Arts, Society & Culture, Creative Arts	Doctor of Philosophy in History of Art	University of Oxford, United Kingdom	Australian Universities'
Rebecca Keeley	Business & Economics, Public Health	Master of Business Administration	University of Oxford, United Kingdom	Tim Fischer
Natalie Meiklejohn	Environment & Sustainability	Master of Science in Carbon Management	University of Edinburgh, United Kingdom	Zelman Cowen
Lt Comm Matthew Newman	Defence, Political Science & Policy Studies	Master of Science in International Relations / Master of Public Policy	London School of Economics	Zelman Cowen
Sophie Rose	Creative Arts	Master of Arts	Bard College, United States of America	Dame Quentin Bryce AD CVO
Tim Rownes	Engineering, Environment & Sustainability	Master of Business Administration	INSEAD Fountainebleau, France	Commonwealth Bank
Dr Jesse Schnall	Medical Studies, Public Health	Master of Public Health	Harvard University, United States of America	Roth/Segal
Dr Xin Zhang	Medical Studies	Doctor of Philosophy in Neurology	University College London, United Kingdom	Susan and Isaac Wakil Foundation

=== 2023 (15 scholars) ===
Name	Field	Degree	University	Scholarship Type
Jessica Cong	Business & Economics	Master of Business Administration	Columbia University, United States of America	Roden Cutler NSW
Bridget Dunne	Law, Political Science & Policy Studies	Master of Science in Criminal Justice Policy	London School of Economics, United Kingdom	Zelman Cowen
Sienna Lake	Law, Political Science & Policy Studies	Master of Science in Politics, Violence and Crime	University College London, United Kingdom	Dame Quentin Bryce AD CVO
Henry Marshall	Biomedical Science, Biological Science	Doctor of Philosophy in Biological Sciences	University of Cambridge, United Kingdom	Chairman's Circle
Nick Maurer	Engineering	Doctor of Philosophy in Social and Engineering Systems	Massachusetts Institute of Technology, United States of America	BHP
Eve Poland	Chemical Science	Doctor of Philosophy in Inorganic Chemistry	University of Oxford, United Kingdom	Australian Universities'
Chris Raine	Public Health, Political Science & Policy Studies	Master of Public Administration (mid-career)	Harvard University, United States of America	Roth/Segal
Abi Rajkumar	Political Science & Policy Studies	Master of Public Administration (mid-career)	Harvard University, United States of America	Rio Tinto
Mathilde Ritman	Information Technology & AI, Physics & Maths	Doctor of Philosophy in Atmospheric, Oceanic and Planetary Physics	University of Oxford, United Kingdom	Wesfarmers
Tom Robertson	Medical Studies, Public Health	Master of Public Policy	University of Oxford, United Kingdom	Tim Fischer
Hugo Rourke	Public Health, Political Science & Policy Studies	Master in Public Administration (mid-career)	Harvard University, United States of America	Commonwealth Bank
Alex Schutz	Engineering	Doctor of Philosophy in Engineering Science	University of Oxford, United Kingdom	John and Anna Belfer Trust
Madi Smith	Environment & Sustainability	Master of Disaster Risk and Resilience	University of Canterbury, New Zealand	Bob Hawke
Germain Tobar	Physics & Maths	Doctor of Philosophy in Theoretical Physics	Stockholm University, Sweden	Australian Universities'
Karri Walker	Law, Political Science & Policy Studies	Master of Laws	Harvard University, United States of America	Victorian Government

=== 2024 (16 scholars) ===
Name	Field	Degree	University	Scholarship Type
Famin Ahmed	Law, Political Science & Policy Studies	Master of Public Policy	University of Oxford, United Kingdom	Queensland Government
Alex Batsis	Business & Economics, Law	Master of Science in Law and Finance	University of Oxford, United Kingdom	Roth/Segal
Emma Beal	Business & Economics, Environment & Sustainability	Master of Business Analytics	Massachusetts Institute of Technology, United States of America	Dame Quentin Bryce AD CVO
Noah Bedford	Law	Master of Laws	Harvard University, United States of America	Bob Hawke
Spencer Collaviti	Physics & Maths	Doctor of Philosophy in Physics	École Polytechnique Fédérale de Lausanne (EPFL), Switzerland	BHP
Trent Crawford	Creative Arts	Masters of Fine Arts	Hamburg Fine Arts School, Germany	Zelman Cowen
Nick Felstead	Information Technology & AI, Law	Master of Laws	Columbia University, United States of America	Victorian Government
Dr Praneel Kumar	Medical Studies, Public Health	Master of Public Health	Johns Hopkins University, United States of America	John and Anna Belfer Trust
Dom Kuzinkovas	Engineering, Biomedical Science	Doctor of Philosophy in Bioengineering	Imperial College London, United Kingdom	Chairman's Circle
Dr Dinesh Palipana	Medical Studies	Master of Sciences in Internal Medicine	University of Edinburgh, United Kingdom	Susan and Isaac Wakil Foundation
Dr Alyssa Pradhan	Biomedical Science, Medical Studies	Doctor of Philosophy in Clinical Medicine	University of Oxford, United Kingdom	Australian Universities'
Jordi Rust	Law	Master of Laws	Columbia University, United States of America	Tim Fischer
Georgina Ryan	Physics & Maths	Doctor of Philosophy in Mathematics	University of Oxford, United Kingdom	Commonwealth Bank
Veronica Sebesfi	Law, Biological Science	Master of Laws	University of Cambridge, United Kingdom	Rio Tinto
Tristan Taylor	Law	Bachelor of Civil Law	University of Oxford, United Kingdom	ANZAC Centenary
Elizabeth Younan	Performing Arts	Doctor of Musical Arts in Composition	The Juilliard School, United States of America	Australian Universities'

=== 2025 (18 scholars) ===
Name	Field	Degree	University	Scholarship Type
Anish Badgeri	Education Studies	Master in Comparative Education	University College London, United Kingdom	Geoff Gallop
Sam Cass	Law, Political Science & Policy Studies	Master of Philosophy in Law	University of Oxford, United Kingdom	John and Anna Belfer Trust
Dr Will Choy	Medical Studies, Public Health	Master of Science in Global Health Science and Epidemiology / Master of Public Policy	University of Oxford, United Kingdom	Roden Cutler NSW
Georgia Dallimore	Engineering, Environment & Sustainability	Master of Science (Aerospace Engineering)	Delft University of Technology, Netherlands	Australian Universities'
Bernadette Dillon	Education Studies, Language & Literature	Master of Science in Language Sciences (Sign Language and Deaf Studies)	University College London, United Kingdom	Queensland Government
Cara Faulkner	Physics & Maths	Doctor of Philosophy in Physics and Astronomy	University of Birmingham, United Kingdom	Australian Universities'
Max Foreman	Biological Science, Physics & Maths	Doctor of Philosophy in Atomic and Laser Physics	University of Oxford, United Kingdom	Australian Universities'
Rhona Hamilton	Biomedical Science, Physics & Maths	Doctor of Philosophy in Physics	University of St Andrews, United Kingdom	BHP
Thenu Herath	International Relations, Political Science & Policy Studies	Master of Public Policy	University of Oxford, United Kingdom	Victorian Government
Mikayla Hyland-Wood	Environment & Sustainability, Political Science & Policy Studies	Master of Science in Water Science, Policy and Management	University of Oxford, United Kingdom	Tim Fischer
Dr Hannah Kempton	Business & Economics, Medical Studies	Executive MBA in innovation and Business Creation	The Technical University of Munich, Germany	Helen and Michael Gannon
Sophie Mayo	Defence, International Relations	Master in Security Studies	Georgetown University, United States of America	Zelman Cowen
Dr Dani Nolan	Environment & Sustainability, Public Health	Master of Climate Change and Planetary Health	London School of Hygiene & Tropical Medicine, United Kingdom	Rio Tinto
Isabella Notarpietro	Environment & Sustainability, Political Science & Policy Studies	Master of Public Policy / Master of Science in Public Policy Research	University of Oxford, United Kingdom	Chairman's Circle
Charlie O'Neill	Engineering, Information Technology & AI	Doctor of Philosophy in Computer Science	University of Oxford, United Kingdom	Commonwealth Bank
Hamish Stewart	Environment & Sustainability, Biological Science	Master of Science in Biodiversity, Conservation and Nature Recovery	University of Oxford, United Kingdom	Bob Hawke
Racheline Tantular	International Relations, Political Science & Policy Studies	Master of Public Administration	London School of Economics	Zelman Cowen
Max Yong	Business & Economics, Political Science & Policy Studies	Master of Public Policy	Harvard University, United States of America	ANZAC Centenary

=== 2026 (17 scholars) ===
Name	Field	Degree	University	Scholarship Type
Nick Bradman	Law	Bachelor of Civil Laws	University of Oxford, United Kingdom	Jane Hansen and Paul Little
Linh Co Bui	Engineering	Master of Science in Robotics	Carnegie Mellon University, United States of America	Commonwealth Bank
Adele Burke	Engineering, Environment & Sustainability	Master of Science in Sustainability, Enterprise and the Environment	University of Oxford, United Kingdom	Katrina Dawson
Nick Clarke	Defence	Masters in Defence, Security Leadership and Management	Cranfield University, United Kingdom	Rio Tinto
Dr Dana Forcey	Medical Studies, Public Health	Master of Health Administration	University of British Columbia, Canada	Victorian Government
Luke Heeney	Business & Economics	Doctor of Philosophy in Economics	Princeton University, United States of America	BHP
Lucas Hu	Medical Studies, Public Health	Master of Science in Applied Digital Health	University of Oxford, United Kingdom	Queensland Government
Emersyn Johnson	Engineering	Doctor of Philosophy in Biomedical Engineering	ETH Zurich, Switzerland	Australian Universities'
Georgia Leak	Political Science & Policy Studies	Master of Communication Science (Political Communication)	University of Amsterdam, Netherlands	Chairman's Circle
Sarah Leary	International Relations, Political Science & Policy Studies	Doctor of Philosophy in Area Studies (South Asia)	University of Oxford, United Kingdom	Wesfarmers
Luke Macaronas	Creative Arts, Performing Arts	Master of Arts in Solo / Dance / Authorship	Berlin University of the Arts	Dame Quentin Bryce AD CVO
Karmil Nguyen	Political Science & Policy Studies	Master of Public Policy	Harvard University, United States of America	Bob Hawke
Jordan O'Reilly	Business & Economics, Public Health	Master in Public Administration (Mid-Career)	Harvard University, United States of America	John and Anna Belfer Trust
Tom Schmaltz	Environment & Sustainability, Physics & Maths	Doctor of Philosophy in Geophysics	University of California, San Diego, United States of America	Zelman Cowen
Josh Snow	Physics & Maths	Master of Computational and Mathematical Engineering	Stanford University, United States of America	Geoff Gallop
Dr Imogen Thomson	Medical Studies, Public Health	Master of Science in Global Health Science and Epidemiology	University of Oxford, United Kingdom	Sir James McCusker
Dr Jenny Tran	Medical Studies, Public Health	Master of Science in Translational Health Sciences	University of Oxford, United Kingdom	Tim Fischer

== Statistics ==
=== Scholars by year ===
Year	Number of scholars
2004	8
2005	7
2006	8
2007	7
2008	8
2009	8
2010	8
2011	8
2012	9
2013	10
2014	15
2015	14
2016	17
2017	20
2018	18
2019	17
2020	20
2021	13
2022	18
2023	15
2024	16
2025	18
2026	17
Total	299

=== Most common universities ===
University	Number of scholars
University of Oxford, United Kingdom	91
Harvard University, United States of America	33
University of Cambridge, United Kingdom	32
Columbia University, United States of America	13
University College London, United Kingdom	12
London School of Economics, United Kingdom	8
Stanford University, United States of America	7
London School of Hygiene & Tropical Medicine, United Kingdom	5
Massachusetts Institute of Technology, United States of America	5
Georgetown University, United States of America	4

== See also ==
- John Monash Scholarship
- General Sir John Monash Foundation
- John Monash – the scholarship's namesake
- List of Rhodes Scholars
