= Liberty Plaza, Colombo =

Liberty Plaza
- Location: Kollupitiya, Sri Lanka
- Coordinates: 06°54′43″N 79°51′.3″E
- Address: No 300, RA de Mel Mawatha, Colombo-03
- Opened: 1985; 41 years ago
- Developer: Chitra Weddikkara
- Owner: Colombo Land and Development Company

Liberty Plaza Shopping Complex also popularly known as Liberty Plaza is a Sri Lankan shopping mall which is located at Western Province, Kollupitiya, Colombo. It sells both local and international brands. It is the first shopping complex to be constructed in Sri Lanka. It was constructed in early 1980s and it is regarded as one of Sri Lanka's oldest and iconic shopping complexes. Chitra Weddikkara served as the quantity surveyor for the construction of the site in 1980s.

The shopping mall sells various products such as clothes, toys, wine, food, accessories, jewellery, etc. It is famous for mobile phone shops and it plays a significant role in the mobile phone business. Liberty Plaza also opened the first store of popular tea brand Mlesna in 1985. The shopping complex is opened everyday except for Sunday.

== See also ==
- Lotus Tower
