= Dilith Jayaweera =

Sri Lankan entrepreneur and lawyer

Hon. Dilith Jayaweera MP
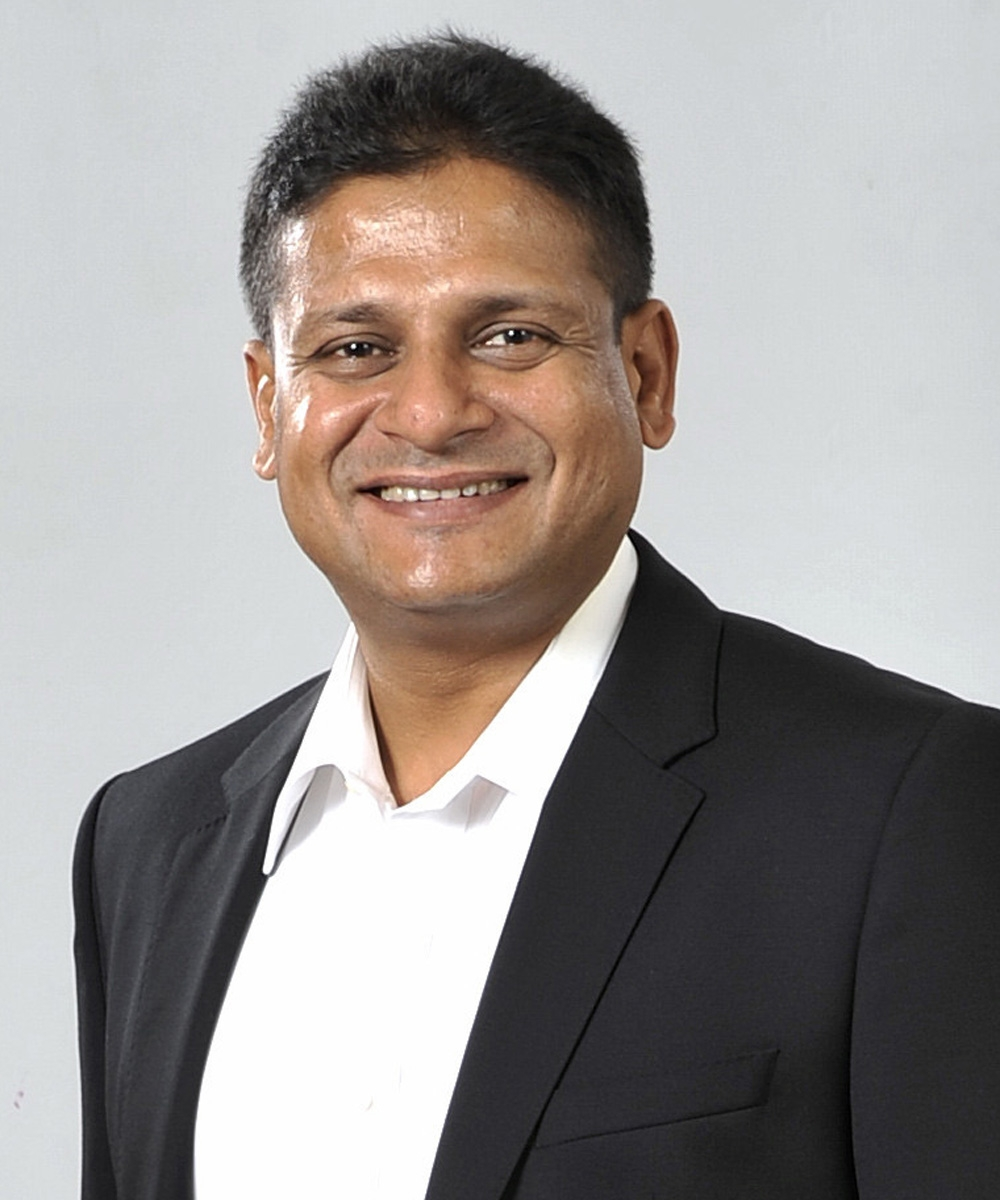
- Dilith Jayaweera

Member of Parliament for National List
- Incumbent
- Assumed office 21 November 2024

Leader of the Mawbima Janatha Pakshaya
- Incumbent
- Assumed office September 2023

Personal details
- Born: Dilith Susantha Jayaweera; 18 September 1967 (age 58) Galle, Sri Lanka
- Party: Mawbima Janatha Pakshaya
- Other political affiliations: Sarvajana Balaya
- Spouse: Nelum Goonewardene
- Education: St. Aloysius' College, Galle; University of Colombo; Sri Lanka Law College
- Occupation: Politician; Entrepreneur; Attorney-at-law
- Website: georgesteuart.lk

Dilith Susantha Jayaweera (born 18 September 1967) is a Sri Lankan businessman, entrepreneur, media mogul, lawyer and politician. He is the former Chairman of George Steuart Group of Companies, and the founder of TV Derana. He entered politics in September 2023 and is the founder and leader of the Mawbima Janatha Pakshaya.

In 2011, he was named by the LMD as one of the top 10 Business People of the Year. In 2020, Jayaweera was among 100 corporate leaders named by the LMD on its A-list of businesspeople in Sri Lanka.

== Early life and education ==
Jayaweera was raised in Angulugaha, a village close to the city of Galle, along with his three brothers Lalith, Gayan and Upul. His father, Gunapala Jayaweera, was an Additional Registrar of Lands, and his mother, Dharma Jayaweera, was a school teacher and principal.

Jayaweera received his primary and secondary education at St. Aloysius' College, Galle, and later joined the Faculty of Law at the University of Colombo, and subsequently Sri Lanka Law College, where he qualified as an Attorney-At-Law. It was at the University of Colombo he met his wife, Nelum Goonewardene. He also holds an MBA from the University of Wales.

Jayaweera is an acquaintance of Dinesh Palipana, a Sri Lankan-Australian doctor and Queensland's first quadriplegic medical intern. Palipana has credited Jayaweera with helping him progress through the accident that left him a quadriplegic.

== Entrepreneurial career ==
A lawyer by profession, Jayaweera set up Triad Advertising (Pvt.) Limited in 1993, in partnership with Varuni Amunugama, whom he had met at the Faculty of Law, University of Colombo.

Jayaweera also funded the ‘Api Wenuwen Api’ Housing Project, a campaign created on behalf of the Sri Lankan Armed Forces to raise the profile of the Sri Lankan army, navy and air forces during the latter stages of the Sri Lankan civil war against the LTTE.

In the post-war Sri Lankan economy, Jayaweera rose to prominence as an aggressive investor – his investment arm Divasa Equity is a majority shareholder in public listed companies such as Citrus Leisure PLC and Colombo Land & Development Company PLC. In October 2011, Jayaweera took over the 176-year-old George Steuart Group, Sri Lanka's oldest mercantile establishment. Jayaweera has held board positions on the Boards of several companies including Citrus Leisure PLC, Colombo Land PLC, and Triad (Pvt.) Ltd, and is the Chairman of the George Steuart Group of Companies.

Jayaweera's media investments includes two national television channels (Derana Macro Entertainment (Television)), one national radio channel (Derana Macro Entertainment (Radio)) and three national newspapers (Liberty Publishers). Jayaweera has also entered industries such as travel and leisure, pharmaceuticals, property and manufacturing via the George Steuart Group of Companies.

== Political career ==
Jayaweera played a significant role in Gotabaya Rajapaksa's 2019 presidential campaign, with Jayaweera using his media influence to amplify the Rajapaksa campaign's visibility islandwide.

Jayaweera formally entered Sri Lankan politics in 2023 when he founded and was appointed as the leader of the Mawbima Janatha Pakshaya (MJP), succeeding Hemakumara Nanayakkara, who was appointed to an advisory position as Senior Leader of the party. Prior the announcement, Jayaweera resigned from several of his company board positions.

On 4 August 2024, Jayaweera was announced as the presidential candidate of the Sarvajana Balaya in the 2024 Sri Lankan presidential election. The Sarvajana Balaya was a political alliance led by Jayaweera consisting of the Jathika Nidahas Peramuna, Pivithuru Hela Urumaya, Mawbima Janatha Pakshaya, the Democratic Left Front, the Communist Party of Sri Lanka and the Independent MP’s Forum. Jayaweera submitted nominations from the Communist Party to contest under the "star" symbol.

Jayaweera finished in sixth place in the first round, winning 122,396 votes.

Jayaweera contested the 2024 parliamentary election from the Gampaha district, but failed to secure a seat. However, he entered parliament through the only national list seat his party gained at the election.

== Controversies ==
In 2011, District Judge of Colombo issued an enjoining order against Shan Wickremesinghe, TNL TV chairman and brother of former president Ranil Wickremesinghe, and one of his directors preventing them from defaming Dilith Jayaweera on a local radio channel Isira Radio. The order was given consequent to action filed by Dilith Jayaweera against Shan Wickremesinghe and his co-host for defamatory comments made on a radio show. Jayaweera also sent the BBC Sinhala service a letter of demand for defamation for carrying a story on the subject.

In 2015, one notable incident was his investigation for stock market manipulation through pump-and-dump schemes by the Financial Crimes Investigation Division (FCID). But nothing has been proven yet.

During the COVID-19 pandemic, there was significant controversy and criticism regarding the profits made from COVID-19 test kits distributed by George Steuart Health, Jayaweera's company. Critics, including members of the Buddhist clergy, claimed that the company made excessive profits by selling the test kits at high prices to private hospitals. Jayaweera responded to the accusations by going to courts to prevent coverage of the incident by News First, claiming to be a victim of defamation.
