= Blue Orbit =

Revolving restaurant in Sri Lanka

- Location within Central Colombo

General information
- Type: Revolving restaurant
- Location: Colombo, Sri Lanka
- Coordinates: 6°55′37″N 79°51′30″E
- Opened: December 2023; 2 years ago
- Operator: Citrus Leisure PLC.

Height
- Height: 751 feet (229 m)

Technical details
- Lifts/elevators: 8

Design and construction
- Architect: Kamilka Perera

Other information
- Seating capacity: 225

Website
- www.blueorbit.lk

Blue Orbit by Citrus Leisure is Sri Lanka's first and only revolving restaurant at the 751 ft (229 m) located on the 26th floor of the Colombo Lotus Tower, which is also South Asia's tallest restaurant. It is managed by Citrus Leisure PLC.

== Overview ==
Blue Orbit is designed to accommodate up to 225 guests, with diverse selection of international cuisines, throughout the day. Operating from 11 am. to 11 pm, the lunch service is available from 11:30 am to 3:30 pm and there are two dinner sittings; 6:30pm to 8:30pm and 9pm to 11:30pm.

In conjunction with Blue Orbit, Citrus Leisure PLC also opened the Cosmic banquet hall within the Colombo Lotus Tower.

== Cosmic (Banquet Hall) ==
Cosmic is a banquet hall, located on the 26th floor of the Colombo Lotus Tower. It has a seating capacity of 350 guests, making Cosmic one of the largest banquet venues in South Asia, catering to various events such as weddings and corporate functions.

== Design ==
The interior design of Blue Orbit was overseen by Chartered Architect and Designer Kamilka Perera. Drawing inspiration from celestial elements, creating an ambiance that complements the restaurant's elevated location.

== See also ==
- List of revolving restaurants
