= Mawbima Janatha Pakshaya =

Mawbima Janatha Pakshaya මව්බිම ජනතා පක්ෂය தாய்நாடு ஜனதா கட்சி
- Abbreviation: MJP
- Leader: Dilith Jayaweera
- Chairman: Roshan Ranasinghe
- Senior Leader: Hemakumara Nanayakkara
- Founded: 11 October 2023
- Headquarters: No. 11, Park Avenue, Colombo 08.
- Ideology: Sinhalese nationalism
- National affiliation: Sarvajana Balaya
- Colors: Blue
- Parliament of Sri Lanka: 1 / 225

Election symbol
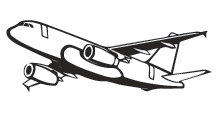

Website
- mjp.lk

The Mawbima Janatha Pakshaya (MJP; Sinhala: මව්බිම ජනතා පක්ෂය, romanized: Mawbima Janathā Pakshaya; Tamil: தாய்நாடு ஜனதா கட்சி, romanized: Tāynāḍu Janathā Kaṭci; lit. 'Motherland People's Party') is a political party in Sri Lanka, founded and led by media mogul, entrepreneur and lawyer Dilith Jayaweera. Former minister Roshan Ranasinghe serves as the party chairman. The party is a constituent member of the Sarvajana Balaya, a political alliance formed in 2024.

== History ==
The party headquarters was inaugurated on 11 October 2023, at Park Avenue in Colombo 08. Dilith Jayaweera assumed leadership of the party, succeeding former MP Hemakumara Nanayakkara, who assumed the position of senior leader of the party. Ranjan Seneviratne is the party's General Secretary. Dr. Sarath Amunugama who was appointed as chairman resigned a few days after the party was created.

On 4 August 2024, MJP leader Dilith Jayaweera was announced as the presidential candidate of the Sarvajana Balaya in the 2024 Sri Lankan presidential election. The Sarvajana Balaya is a political alliance led by Jayaweera consisting of the Jathika Nidahas Peramuna, Pivithuru Hela Urumaya, Mawbima Janatha Pakshaya, the Democratic Left Front, the Communist Party of Sri Lanka and the Independent MP’s Forum. Jayaweera submitted nominations from the Communist Party to contest under the "star" symbol. Jayaweera finished in sixth place in the first round, winning 122,396 votes.

The MJP contested in the 2024 parliamentary election as part of the Sarvajana Balaya, however the alliance failed to secure a single seat and only won one national list seat. The Sarvajana Balaya nominated Jayaweera as its national list MP.

== Ideology ==
The MJP, according to Jayaweera, emphasises an entrepreneurial approach to address the nation's challenges. The party seeks to promote an entrepreneurial mindset, encouraging the youth to contribute to the nation's growth and attracting foreign income. Recognising historical challenges related to majoritarian nationalism, the MJP aims to bridge divides between communities.
