= Chitra Weddikkara =

Sri Lankan professor of economics and architect

Dona Enfreeda Rangani Chitra Weddikkara (1947), known as Chitra Weddikkara, is a Sri Lankan professor of building economics, a chartered architect, a chartered quantity surveyor, an external examiner, an administrator, and a frequent speaker at construction-related professional venues.

== Early life and education ==
Weddikkara, was born in Negombo, Sri Lanka, the eldest daughter in a family of five children. Her father was an education inspector who worked during the British colonial period and her mother was a school principal. Weddikkara gained her primary education at the Ave Maria Convent in Negombo, and she completed her secondary education at the Good Shepherd College in Kotahena, Colombo. She completed a B.Sc Built Environment degree in the University of Colombo and went on to study architecture at the Western Australian Institute of Technology (now, the Curtin University), and qualified in architecture in 1975. She later earned a Ph.D. in Dispute Resolution at the College of Law, Murdoch University, Perth, Western Australia, a Master of Science (Building Studies), Curtin University of Technology, Western Australia, a Bachelor of Applied Science in Quantity Surveying, Curtin University of Technology, Perth, Western Australia, an Associate Diploma in Quantity Surveying, Western Australian Institute of Technology, Perth, a Certificate in Mediation (LEADR), Australia, a Certificate in International Construction Management, Sweden, and Associateship in Architecture, Western Australian Institute of Technology.

In 2013, she was presented with an honorary degree from the University of Salford.

== Academic career ==
In 1983, Weddikkara joined the Department of Architecture at the University of Moratuwa, Sri Lanka as a part-time lecturer. In 1985, she became a full-time lecturer. In 1987, she took over the position of Head of the Department of Building Economics at the University of Moratuwa, managing the newly created degree course in Quantity Surveying. During her tenure the department introduced new degree courses, including B.Sc in Facilities Management, M.Sc in Project Management and M.Sc in Law and Dispute Resolution in Construction, and a postgraduate degree leading to the M.Sc. in Landscape Architecture.

Weddikkara later became the Dean of the Faculty of Architecture at the University of Moratuwa, Sri Lanka, acting as Project Director of the Project Consultancy Unit of the Faculty of Architecture. She was a senior lecturer at the University of Western Sydney in New South Wales, Australia. She later became an honorary visiting professor at the University of West Indies in the Department of Geomatics Engineering and Land Management, Faculty of Engineering, St Augustine.

== Research ==
Weddikkara has researched and written about space planning and management in higher educational institutes, sustainability in quality survey professional culture, skills and competencies required for facilities managers in the Middle East, the importance of trade unions to construction workers in Sri Lanka, the design of buildings towards environment sustainable construction, financing of infrastructure and leisure facilities in developing countries, and, more recently, the maintainability of highrise buildings.

In 2005 she prepared an evaluation and assessment of tsunami damages to health facilities for the World Bank and also completed consultancy work for contract administration of 108 schools for NCCSL through the Building Economics research unit.

== Committees ==
Weddikkara is a Fellow of the Royal Institution of Chartered Surveyors (RICS) UK, the Institute of Quantity Surveyors, Sri Lanka, and the Sri Lanka Institute of Architects (S.L.I.A).

She is a member of Constitution board of RICS, the Australian Institute of Quantity Surveyors (A.I.Q.S), the Institute of Project Managers (I.P.M.(SL) and the Royal Australian Institute of Architects (R.A.I.A) She is an associate member of the Australian Institute of Builders (A.I.O.B), and of the Institute of Arbitrators and Mediators.

Weddikkara has been a member of many committees and boards of directors at the University of Moratuwa.

In 2014 Weddikkara is the incumbent President of the Institute of Quantity Surveyors Sri Lanka, Senior Vice President of the Institute of Architects Sri Lanka, Former Chairman of the Board of Architectural Education at the Sri Lanka Institute of Architects (SLIA), a founding council member of the Chamber of Construction Industry, a member of the Advisory board for Construction and Engineering Services, former Director of Board of Institute of Construction, Training and Development (ICTAD), Chairperson of the RICS chapter in Sri Lanka, Advisor for the Council of the Ceylon Institute of Builders (CIOB) member of advisory board on professional services for the export development Board, Director of the Green council in Sri-Lanka and overseas representative of the Australian Institute of Quantity surveyors. She was also the chairperson of the conference of 15th Pacific association of Quantity surveyors held in Colombo Sri-Lanka and the member of the National Advisory council on construction accredited mediator of the Commercial mediation center of Sri Lanka.

In 2013 Chitra Weddikkara was elected secretary of the Commonwealth Association of Surveying and Land Economy.

In 2014, she was the Director of the Green Building Council of Sri Lanka.

== Professional career ==
Weddikkara began her professional career in 1971 as a junior assistant architect in the Department of Buildings, Colombo, Sri Lanka. She also worked as an assistant architect for John Pidgeon Architect West Perth, Australia and Christopher R Thompson & Associates, West Perth, Australia, where in 1974 she was promoted to Architect. She was Architect at the Royal Perth, Hospital WA. From 1977 to 1980. She worked as a Quantity Surveyor at Ian Silver Partnership, Quantity Surveyors, Project Management & Cost Planning Consultants, Como, Western Australia, and later as Project Quantity Surveyor for the State Engineering Corporation of Sri Lanka. In 1983 she became a Director of Design Consortium Ltd. In 2014 she is a director of Susil Weddikkara & Associates (Pvt.) Ltd, and Managing Director of QServe (Pvt) Ltd., QServe (Global) (Pvt) Ltd and QServe Qatar.

Weddikkara was the project Quantity surveyor for the Ramada Renaissance hotel in Sri Lanka, Housing Complex at Colombo-8 for Dart Express, Air Lanka Peacock Lounge at Bandaranaike Airport, Katunayake, Deer Park Hotel at Giritale, New Zealand Milk Product factory & office at Biyagama, Ella Rest house at Ella, South East University at Oluvil, Mendis Apartments at Colombo-7, Renuka city Hotel at Colombo-3, Crescat Development, Bank of Ceylon Kandy, Peoples Property Development Ltd., Ceylinco Development Projects, in addition to cost assessment and insurance claims related to Damage to Twin Towers due to bomb blast, Assessment of Hotel Intercontinental, Assessment of Liberty Plaza (for Colombo Lands), Assessment of reinstatement of Medhufushi Island Resort at Mulaku Atoll, Republic of Maldives.

Weddikkkara has also been involved in the process of legal recognition of the Institute of Quantity Surveyors, Sri Lanka (IQSSL), leading to the Institute of Quantity Surveyors, Sri Lankan Act No 20 of 2007. As per article 13 of the Act, the Associate members are designated as Chartered Quantity Surveyors.

== Conferences and presentations ==
Weddikkara has spoken at various conferences, including the 10th and 12th Pacific Association of Quantity Surveyors Congress, Singapore and Edmonton, the CASLE conference in Cypress, 2009, the 13th Asian Congress of Architects in Busan, Korea, the National Sri Lanka Institute of Architects Conference 2006 at BMICH. She has also conducted seminars and workshops at BMICH, University of Moratuwa, Sri Lanka Institute of Architecture, CCI, and RICS.

She has also taught short course in Effective Financial Control in Construction, (Department of Building Economics, University of Moratuwa: ETA Learning Center Dubai), Construction Claims (Department of Building Economics, University of Moratuwa: ETA Learning Center Dubai) and Value management (for M.Sc. Students University of Western Sydney Australia 2002).

== Publications ==
- The Impact of Professional Culture On Dispute Resolution (ISBN 978-3-639-08054-4) Published by VDM Verlag Dr. Muller Aktiengesellschaft & Co.
- Weddikkara, Chitra. and Cambell Hugh Building Quantities and Estimating 5 2184F (Assessment guide and lecture notes for Open Training Education Network (OTEN) 2001 TAFE Sydney-Australia
- Dezylva E, Weddikkara, Chitra & Emmanuel, M.P.R. Sri-Lanka Construction Industry in the 80's IDA/UNDP/ILO for Ministry of Policy Planning and Implementation & Institute of construction training and development
- Weddikkara, Chitra & Manewa, R.MA.S (2010). "Designing buildings towards the environment sustainable construction", PAQS conference Singapore
- Weddikkara, Chitra, (2009)."Financing of leisure sector" CASLE conference in Cyprus 2009
- Weddikkara, Chitra & Ramachandra, Thanuja (2008). "Claims Maintainability of High – Rise Buildings and the Associated Risks Publication of the National Construction Contractors Association of Sri Lanka
- Weddikkara, Chitra, (2008). "Financing of infrastructure in the developing countries", CASLE Conference in India
- Weddikkara, Chitra & Ramachandra, Thanuja (2007). "Claims Maintainability of High – Rise Buildings and the Associated Risks, PAQS conference Malaysia
- Weddikkara, Chitra (2006). " The Sri Lankan Construction Industry- The Past, Present and Future".
- Weddikkara, Chitra. (2006) "Sri Lanka Construction Industry in the 80’s", ILO/ for Ministry of Policy Planning and Implementation. Institute For Construction Training and Development.
- Weddikkara, Chitra (2005). "Sri Lanka Economics by QS", in Sri Lanka Architects, vol. 100(8).
- C. Weddikkara and S. Menaha, "The Myths of Project Management as practiced in Sri Lanka Today", Chamber of Construction industry bulletin, Volume 03, May/June 2004
- C. Weddikkara, "Sri Lankan construction industry in the past, present and future", Chamber of construction industry bulletin, December, 2004.
- Weddikkara, Chitra (2003). The procurement & Cost management of a high-rise building in Colombo Sri Lanka A case study proceedings International conference in Project cost Management May 2003
- Weddikkara, Chitra (2003) Study of some Economic aspects of the Building Boom in Sri Lanka in 1978 with reference to a selected area in Colombo (Abstract published in "Architect"- The Journal of Sri Lanka Institute of Architects 2003, vol. 301(6) Oct/Nov)
- Weddikkara, Chitra. The outlook of the Sri Lankan construction Industry Present and Future constructor 2002
