= Mlesna =

Tea production company

- Company type: Private
- Industry: Beverage
- Founded: 1983; 43 years ago
- Headquarters: Colombo, Sri Lanka
- Area served: Worldwide
- Key people: Anselm Perera
- Products: Tea
- Website: www.mlesnateas.com

Mlesna Tea is a tea company owned by Euro-Scan Exports based in Sri Lanka. The company produces a range of loose teas, tea bags and gifts including: black tea, green tea, flavoured teas, and herbal teas.

== History ==
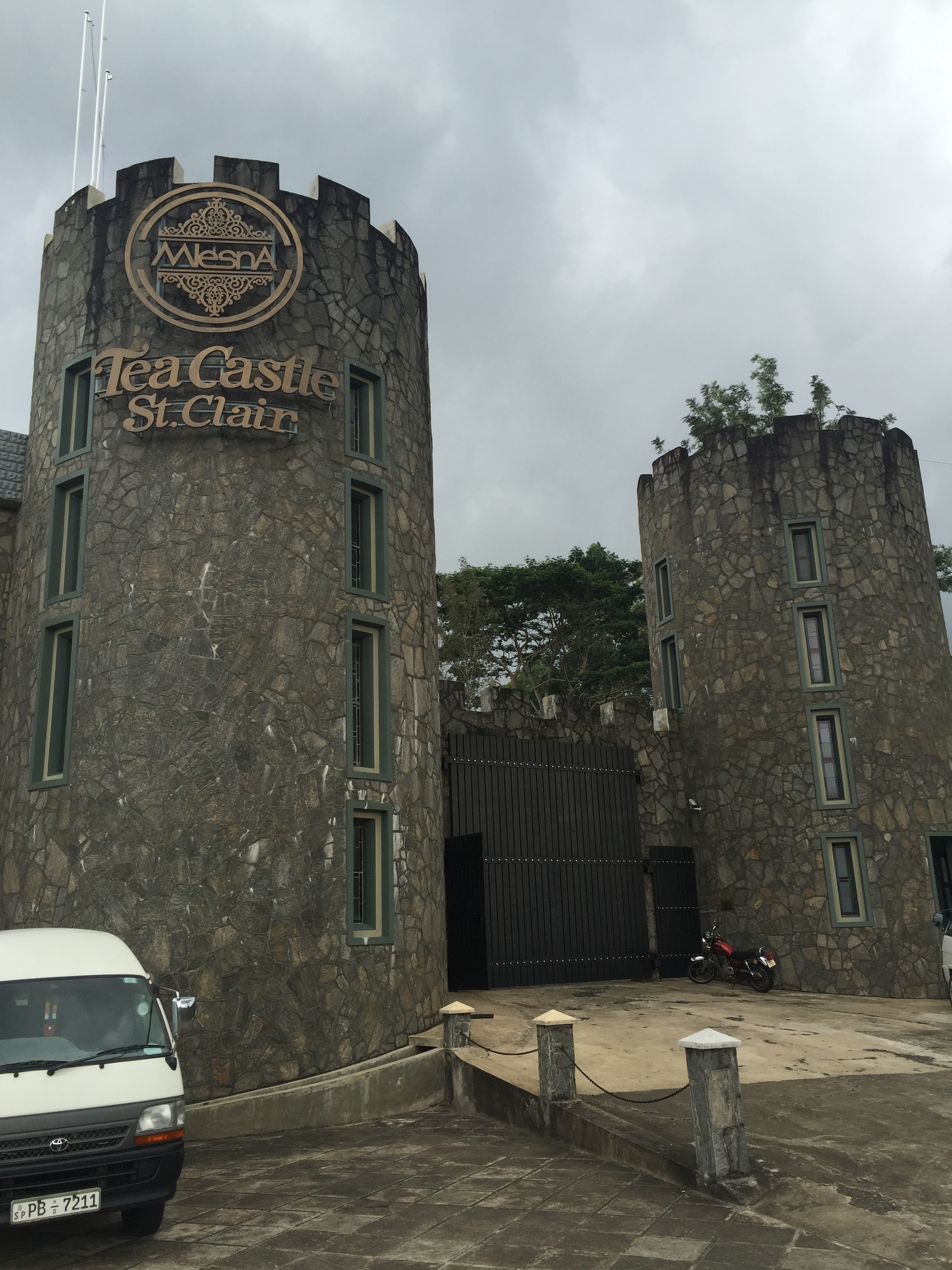

The company was established by Anselm Perera in 1983. Perera was initially employed as a tea taster for Brooke Bond in 1969 at eighteen. He remained with Brooke Bond for ten years before becoming the Tea Manager at Shaw Wallace and Hedges and within one and a half years was promoted to Tea Director. In 1983 he decided to form his own company, Mlesna, which is a mirror image of his first name Anselm (as he was born on St Anselm’s Day).

Mlesna innovated the Tea Centre and Tea Kiosk concept in Sri Lanka, opening their first store in Liberty Plaza, Colombo in 1985. The company now has sixteen outlets throughout the country. This concept has been further expanded with outlets in Russia, Japan, Taiwan, Australia, Greece and India.

== Awards ==
Mlesna has won 82 awards, consisting of 19 Presidential Export Awards, 11 National Export Awards, 23 Lanka Star Awards (National Packaging Awards), 17 Asia Star Awards (Asian Packaging Awards) and nine World Star Awards (Packaging Excellence and Superior Quality, awarded by the World Packaging Organisation).
