= Sarvajana Balaya =

Sarvajana Balaya සර්වජන බලය சர்வஜன அதிகாரம்
- Abbreviation: SB
- Leader: Dilith Jayaweera
- Founded: 2024
- Preceded by: Supreme Lanka Coalition
- Headquarters: No. 11, Udyana Road, Colombo 08.
- Ideology: Big tent; Sinhalese nationalism; Socialism
- Political position: Centre-left to far-left
- Colors: Blue
- Parliament of Sri Lanka: 1 / 225
- Local government: 226 / 8,793

Election symbol
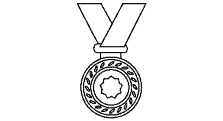
- Medal

Website
- sarvajanabalaya.com

Sarvajana Balaya is a political alliance in Sri Lanka founded in 2024. It is led by media mogul, entrepreneur and lawyer Dilith Jayaweera. Initially, the alliance consisted of Jayaweera's own party, the Mawbima Janatha Pakshaya, and several other left-wing nationalist parties.

== Member parties ==
The Sarvajana Balaya consists of the following parties:

- Mawbima Janatha Pakshaya
- Communist Party of Sri Lanka
- Democratic Left Front (formerly)
- Independent MP's Forum
- Jathika Nidahas Peramuna (formerly)
- National Organization for Duty
- Pivithuru Hela Urumaya

== Electoral history ==
=== Presidential ===
On 4 August 2024, Dilith Jayaweera was announced as the presidential candidate of the Sarvajana Balaya in the 2024 Sri Lankan presidential election. Jayaweera submitted his nomination under the Communist Party to contest under the "star" symbol. Jayaweera came in sixth place in the first round, receiving 122,396 votes.

Election	Candidate	Votes	%	Result
2024	Dilith Jayaweera	122,396	0.92%	Lost

=== Parliamentary ===
The Sarvajana Balaya contested the 2024 parliamentary election, but failed to win a single seat and won only one national list seat. Dilith Jayaweera was nominated as the alliance's national list MP.

Election	Votes	%	Seats	+/–	Result
2024	178,006	1.60%	1 / 225	New	Opposition

=== Local ===
Election	Votes	%	Seats	+/–
2025	294,681	2.83%	226 / 8,793	New
