= Dinesh Palipana =

Australian doctor, lawyer and disability advocate

Dinesh Palipana OAM
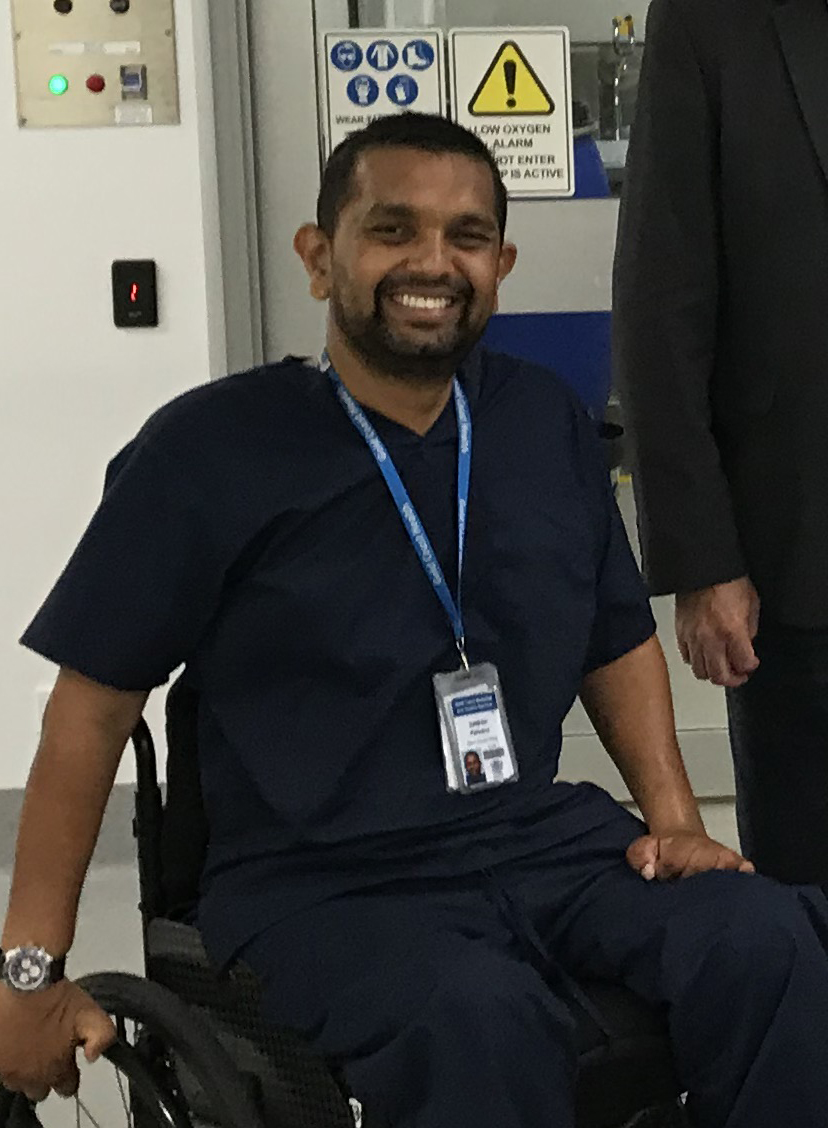
- Born: 1984 (age 41–42); Kandy, Sri Lanka
- Education: Griffith University; Queensland University of Technology
- Occupations: Doctor and Lawyer
- Political party: Liberal National
- Awards: 2021 Queensland Australian of the Year
- Honours: Order of Australia Medal

Dinesh Palipana (born 1984) is an Australian doctor, lawyer, scientist and disability advocate. He is the first quadriplegic medical intern in Queensland, Australia. He is the second person with quadriplegia to graduate as a doctor in Australia and the first with spinal cord injury.

Palipana has been an advocate for medical students with disabilities in Australia, where significant barriers existed.

== Career ==
Dinesh Palipana obtained a degree in law from the Queensland University of Technology. He then commenced a Doctor of Medicine at the Griffith University, graduating in 2016 as the first quadriplegic medical graduate in the state of Queensland, the second in Australia. He graduated with several awards and was featured in the Griffith University video Dinesh Palipana is remarkable. He completed a medical clerkship at Harvard Medical School. Palipana holds the title of lecturer at Griffith University. Dinesh was admitted as a lawyer in September, 2020. He became a fellow of the Australasian College of Legal Medicine in 2026.

Following a spinal cord injury, Palipana found adapted ways to be trained as a quadriplegic doctor in partnership with Griffith University and the Gold Coast University Hospital. This was a previously unaccomplished feat in Queensland. He has consequently openly advocated for training medical students with disabilities in Australia.

Despite spending two years in clinical training as a medical student at the Gold Coast University Hospital, Palipana faced challenges in securing initial employment in his home state of Queensland under Queensland Health. At one point, he was the only Queensland medical graduate without an employment offer for the year 2016 despite testaments to his ability.

He was eventually employed by the Gold Coast University Hospital to become Queensland's first quadriplegic intern. He has worked in the emergency department at the hospital, the second busiest department in Australia in 2017. He was nominated for an Intern of the Year award at the Gold Coast University Hospital in 2017.

With an interest in radiology, he is a contributor on Radiopaedia, a radiology education portal designed for medical professionals.

In 2020, Palipana became the team doctor for the Gold Coast Titans Physical Disability Rugby League team. He served as a senior advisor to the Royal Commission into Violence, Abuse, Neglect and Exploitation of People with Disability.

Palipana was appointed to the board of directors at George Steuart Group in 2024.

== Injury ==
During medical school, Palipana was involved in a car accident causing a spinal cord injury and quadriplegia. He was 25 years old at the time. The 2010 motor vehicle accident occurred on Brisbane's Gateway Motorway. A physician attending the accident scene with emergency services had taught Palipana during medical school. During his recuperation, Palipana experienced complications that included sepsis and pleural effusion.

Palipana subsequently spent seven months at a spinal injuries unit in the Princess Alexandra Hospital. He met the boxer Joe Frazier during his admission in hospital.

== Advocacy ==
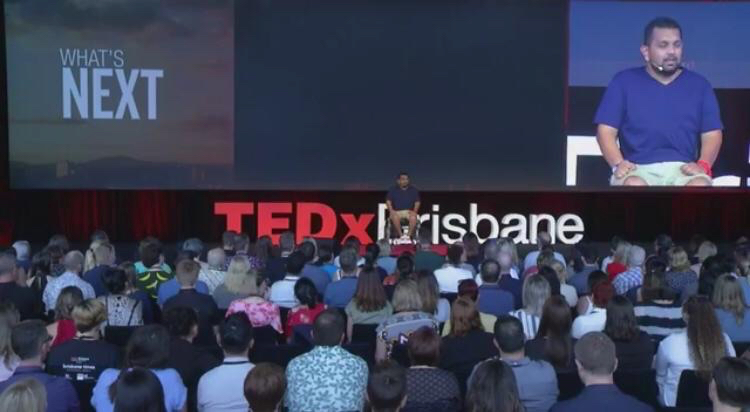
Dinesh Palipana at TEDxBrisbane 2018

While recuperating from his injury, Palipana spent some time in Sri Lanka. During that time, he was noted for raising awareness and funding for spinal cord injury in the country. In 2013, he gifted a stock of medical supplies for spinal cord injury to the then minister of health Maithripala Sirisena. Palipana sits on the council of the Sri Lanka Spinal Cord Network.

In 2015, the Medical Deans of Australia and New Zealand issued a set of guidelines providing Australian medical schools the power to exclude students with a range of disabilities. The guidelines can potentially be used exclude medical students with similar conditions to Palipana. By using his story as an example, Palipana has been a vocal advocate for taking an inclusive approach to medical education in the country instead. Palipana has been using his story to demonstrate ways in which doctors, and the wider population, can work effectively with disabilities. In 2018, he was a keynote speaker at Stanford Medicine X at the Stanford University and TEDxBrisbane on the topic. Through various capacities, he has been an advocate for inclusive employment generally.

He is a founding member of Doctors with Disabilities Australia, an advocacy group for physicians with disabilities. Through Doctors with Disabilities Australia, Palipana supported some Indian peers in an Indian High Court case during 2019. The case involved a challenge of the Medical Council of India's decisions around medical education and disabilities.

Palipana is a member of the Ambassador Council at the Hopkins Centre, a centre for research in rehabilitation and resilience. He has been a member of the Australian Medical Association Queensland's Council of Doctors in Training since 2017. Palipana has worked with the Australian Medical Association to promote inclusion in the profession. Since gaining employment at the Gold Coast University Hospital, Palipana has promoted inclusion within the organisation.

He became an ambassador for Physical Disability Australia in 2020. In 2021, he became an ambassador to the IncludeAbility project of the Australian Human Rights Commission.

During the COVID-19 pandemic, Palipana advocated for the interests of people with disabilities, particularly in healthcare. Palipana appeared on ABC's Q&A to speak about the issue. He spoke at the 2020 Disability Royal Commission on the topic. He has advocated for safer air travel for people with disability, having experienced challenges in air travel himself.

Palipana was involved in advocating for changes to a spinal injuries unit in Queensland.

== Research ==
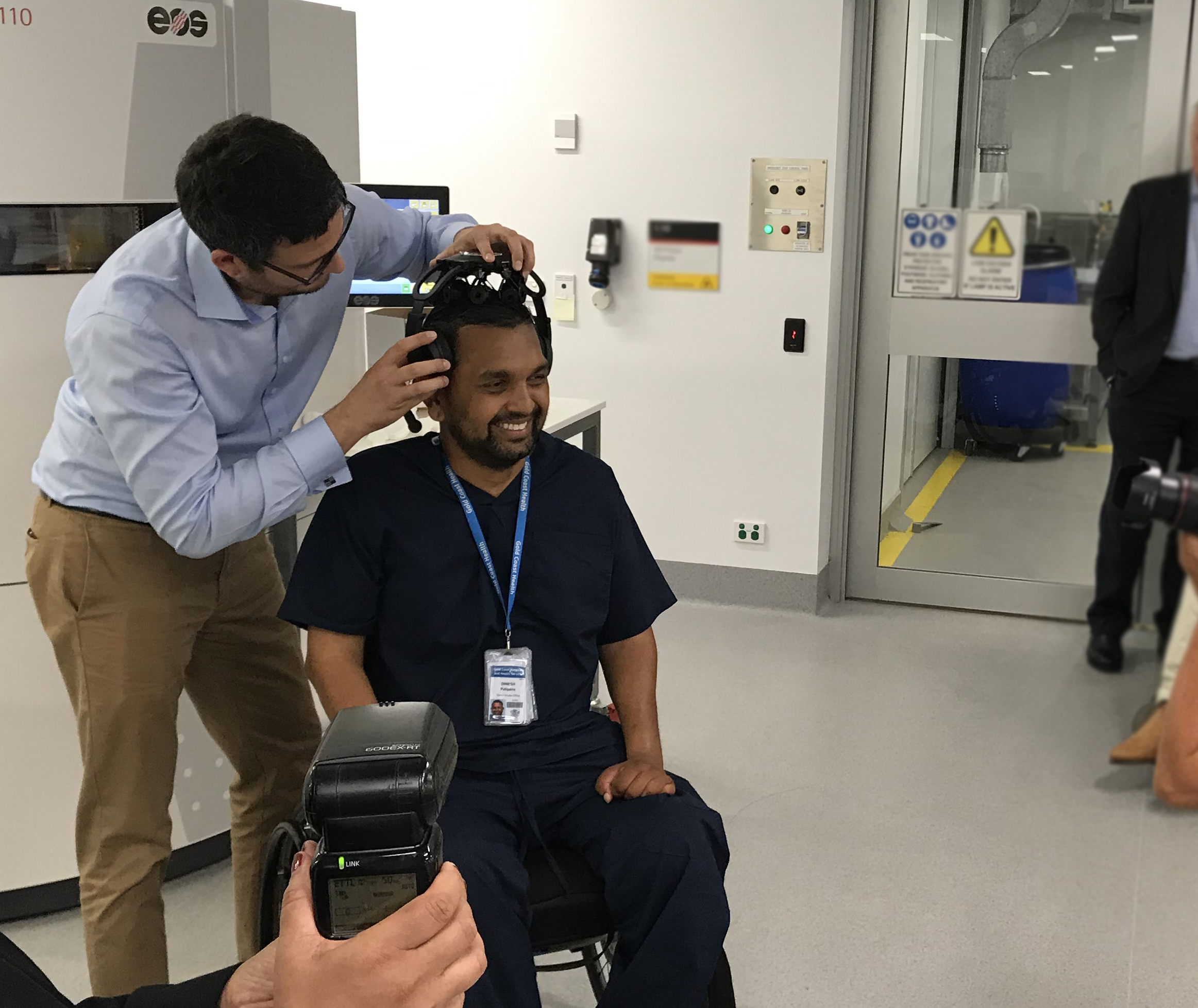
Dr Dinesh Palipana OAM being photographed at Griffith University's Advanced Design and Prototyping Technologies Institute, where he co-leads the innovative Biospine project with Dr Claudio Pizzolato.

Palipana has interests in spinal cord injury research. He was awarded $2 million in 2019 to pursue research in thought-controlled rehabilitation. The study was featured on The Project. The work received a further $3.8 million in 2023. He attributes this passion to his own injury. Palipana is a member of the Perry Cross Spinal Research Foundation's scientific committee.

Palipana's interest includes non-invasive interventions to promote functional improvement in spinal cord injury. Some of these interventions have involved electroencephalography (EEG) and electrical stimulation, which was highlighted in Griffith University's Be Remarkable media campaign. He has been encouraged by a mentor at Harvard University, where he was one of the first visiting medical students of this nature. The project received $2 million Australian in 2019 from the Queensland Government.

Palipana has published articles on disability, COVID-19 and medicine.

== Accessible adventure tourism ==
Palipana was one of the first to scale the world’s first inclusive bridge climb on Brisbane’s Story Bridge. He was one of the first to trial the world’s first vertical restaurant using a wheelchair. He has bungee jumped from a wheelchair.

== Personal life ==
Palipana was born in Kandy, Sri Lanka to Chithrani and Sanath Palipana. He grew up in Byron Bay and Brisbane, Australia. Palipana attributes much of his success to the support of his mother.

== Media ==
Palipana's story was featured on the popular ABC radio show Conversations with Richard Fidler, the ABC television show Australian Story, BBC Outlook, Today, and Vice (magazine). He appeared on the cover of Sri Lanka's Pulse Magazine in January 2020. Dinesh has spoken at various events such as TED (conference) and alongside figures such as Kerry O'Brien and Deng Thiak Adut regarding his experiences.

Palipana has written for Ars Technica, ABC News (Australia) and Medscape.

Palipana was a runway model for the Adaptive Fashion Collective at the Australian Fashion Week and appeared in Vogue and Harper's Bazaar. He has been featured in the Brisbane Portrait Prize.

Palipana's autobiography Stronger was released by Pan MacMillan in 2022.

== Awards, recognition and honours ==
- 2019: Medal of the Order of Australia for service to medicine
- 2019: Junior Doctor of the Year at the Gold Coast University Hospital
- 2019: Third Australian to be awarded the Henry Viscardi Achievement Award
- 2019: 'Change Making' in National Awards for Disability Leadership
- 2020: Aspire Awards: Individual Best Achievement in Medicine
- 2021: Queensland Australian of the Year
- 2021: Griffith University Young Alumnus of the Year
- 2021: International Day of People with Disability Ambassador
- 2022: Red Bull Wings for Life World Run Ambassador
- 2022: Australia Day Ambassador
- 2022: The Courier Mail's Power list: Queensland’s most influential in health, wellbeing - number 33
- 2022: The Gold Coast Titans STAR Ambassador
- 2024: John Monash scholarship
- 2026: The Courier Mail: Queensland's most powerful health figures - number 61
- 2026: Gold Coast Bulletin's 15 smart Gold Coasters to watch
- 2026: Sri Lanka Day community champion
- 2026: The Courier Mail: Queensland’s 50 most inspiring men

Coat of arms of Dinesh Palipana
Notes Granted 28 January 2022 Crest Upon a helm with a wreath Agent and Sable a demi lion Argent gorged with chain Or pendent therefrom a rose Gules barbed Vert charged with a Maltese cross Argent and holding with the dexter paw a Rod of Aesculapius in bend sinister Sable the serpent Argent. Escutcheon Per bend bevilled Sable and Argent issuant in chief and on the sinister a phoenix Argent enflamed Proper. Motto Invictus Per Aspera
