= Lotus Tower =

Telecommunications tower in Colombo, Sri Lanka and tallest tower in South Asia

- නෙළුම් කුළුණ தாமரைக் கோபுரம்
- Lotus Tower in 2018

- Location within Central Colombo Location within Sri Lanka Location within Asia Location within Earth

Record height
- Tallest in South Asia since 2019^{[I]}

General information
- Status: Completed
- Type: Mixed use: Digital Terrestrial Television ISDB-T; Telecommunications; Observation; Hospitality; Events; Tourist attraction; Retail
- Location: Colombo, Sri Lanka
- Coordinates: 6°55′37″N 79°51′30″E
- Completed: 15 September 2019
- Opened: 16 September 2022

Height
- Antenna spire: 351.5 m (1,153.2 ft)

Technical details
- Floor count: 13 (6 in base, 7 in flower)
- Lifts/elevators: 8

Website
- https://colombolotustower.lk/

References
- I. "Our Story - Lotus Tower Colombo". Archived from the original on 1 February 2024.

The Lotus Tower (Sinhala: නෙළුම් කුළුණ, romanized: Nelum Kuluna; Tamil: தாமரைக் கோபுரம், romanized: Tāmaraik Kōpuram), also known as the Colombo Lotus Tower, stands at a height of 351.5 meters (1,153 feet) in Colombo, Sri Lanka. It has become a symbolic landmark for the country. As of 2019, the tower is the tallest self-supported structure in South Asia and the second tallest overall, behind the guy-wire-supported INS Kattabomman antenna tower in India. It ranks as the 11th tallest tower in Asia and the 19th tallest tower in the world. Initially, the tower was proposed to be built in Peliyagoda, but the Government of Sri Lanka later decided to change the location. The lotus-shaped structure serves various purposes, including communication and observation, as well as leisure facilities. The estimated cost of construction was approximately US$113 million.

== Location ==
Colombo 01, near Beira Lake. After an initial decision to construct the tower within the confines of a suburb of the country's economic capital city of Colombo, Sri Lanka's government announced their plans to shift the location to the heart of the city. Therefore, the tower's location is on the waterfront of the Beira Lake.

== Construction ==
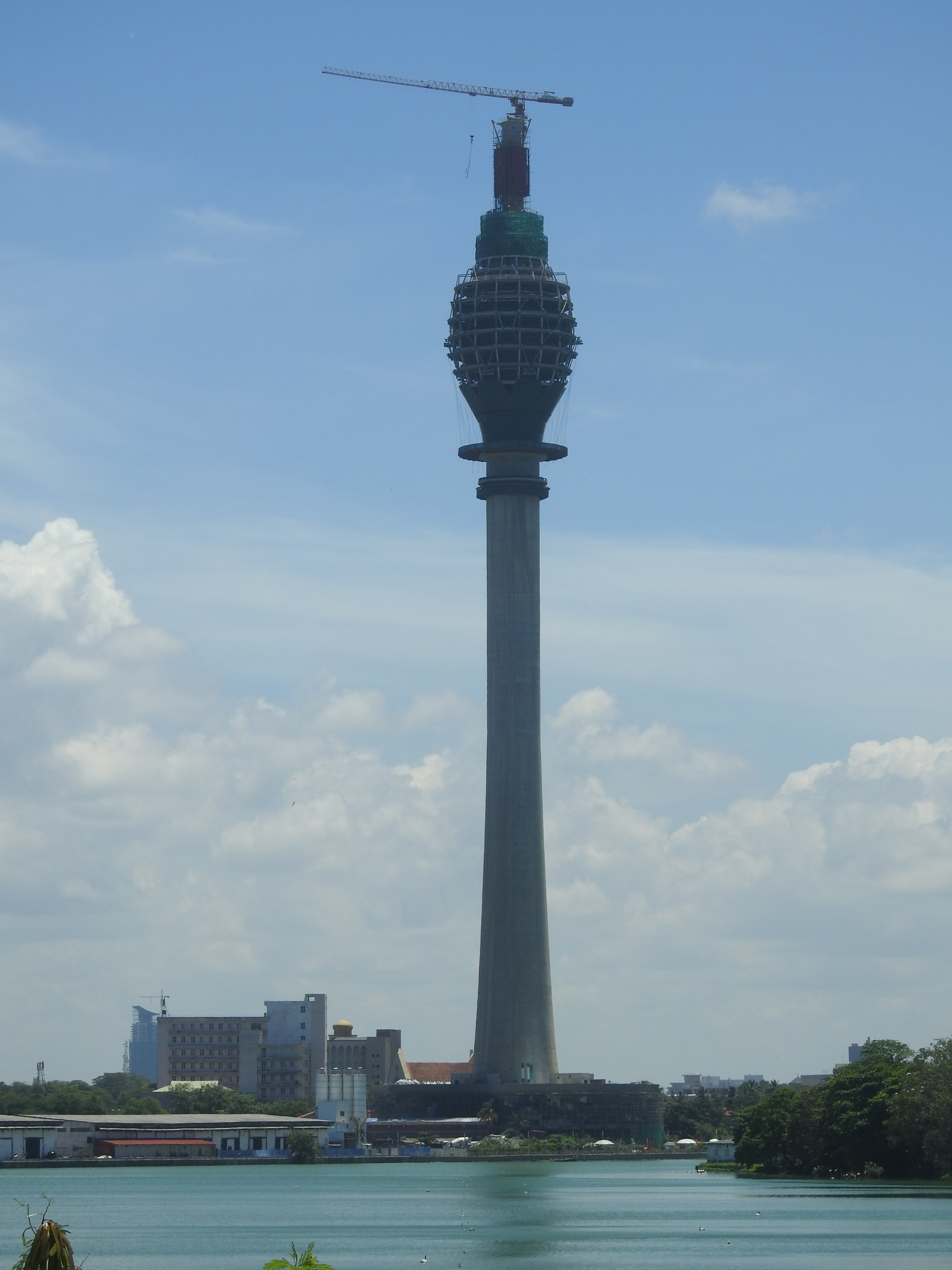
Lotus Tower under construction

With the witness of the President of Telecommunications Regulatory Commission of Sri Lanka (TRCSL), the Secretary of the Sri Lanka Foreign Ministry, the Presidents of China National Electronics Import & Export Corporation (CEIEC) and Aerospace Long March International Trade Co. Ltd (ALIT) signed the contract with the Director-General of TRCSL, Anusha Palpita, for the project on 3 January 2012.

This project coordinate by Sri Lankan government the construction began on 20 January 2012 following a foundation stone-laying ceremony. The site is located on the waterfront of Beira Lake and alongside a part of the D. R. Wijewardene Mawatha.

In December 2014, the tower's construction crossed the 125 m (410 ft) milestone and in July 2015, the tower reached 255 m (837 ft).

== Design and function ==
Lotus Tower at night in 2023

The design of this building is inspired by the Lotus flower. The lotus symbolizes purity within Sri Lankan culture and is also said to symbolize the country's flourishing development. The tower base is inspired by the lotus throne and will also be formed by two inverted trapezoids. The tower's color can be changed by RGB lights.

The tower is 350 m (1,150 ft) tall and covers 30,600 m^{2} (329,000 sq ft) of floor area. South Asia's most prestigious casino Majestic Pride is located in Lotus tower

The Lotus Tower's main revenue sources are tourism and antenna leasing. It functions as a radio and television broadcasting antenna ISDB-T and proposed DVB-T2 support structure for 50 television services, 35 FM radio stations and 20 telecommunication service providers, and will house a variety of tourist attractions.

The tower has four entrances, with two being used as VIP (distinguished guests and state leaders) entrances. A telecommunications museum and restaurant are located on the ground floor. The tower podium consists of 6 floors. The first floor of the podium accommodates a museum and two exhibition halls. The second floor is utilised for several conference halls with seating space for more than 500 people. Restaurants, supermarkets, and food courts are situated on the third floor. A 1000-seat auditorium is located on the fourth floor, which is also used as a ballroom. The fifth floor includes luxury hotel rooms and large ballrooms, and the seventh floor hosts an observation gallery. The landscaping is planned in the form of a large water park.

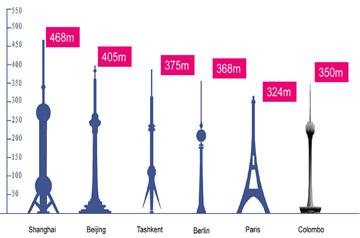
Lotus Tower, as compared to some of the tallest towers around the world

== Transport hub ==
The Colombo Monorail, which was a proposed monorail system in Colombo, and the BRT system were to converge at a common 'multi-modal hub' located in close proximity to the Lotus Tower, making the tower a major city center. The Monorail was canceled in 2016, and both, a light rail will be constructed in Malabe.

== Controversy ==
During the opening ceremony, which was held on 16 September 2019, President Maithripala Sirisena at a ceremonial speech mentioned and claimed an allegation on a scam regarding an advance of 2 billion rupees which was given to an approved company ALIT in 2012 by the then government, was later revealed in 2016 that such a company did not exist. However, this was later proven to be false as ALIT was in fact the acronym of the Chinese state-owned Aerospace Long-March International Trade Co. ALIT denied receiving the payment claiming that the entire amount was paid to the China National Electronics Import & Export Corporation (CEIEC) as ALIT had left the project. It also noted that the TRC paid $15.6 million (2 billion rupees) into CEIEC's account in Exim Bank in October 2012, the same amount which Sirisena claims to have been "misappropriated" by ALIT.

== Gallery ==
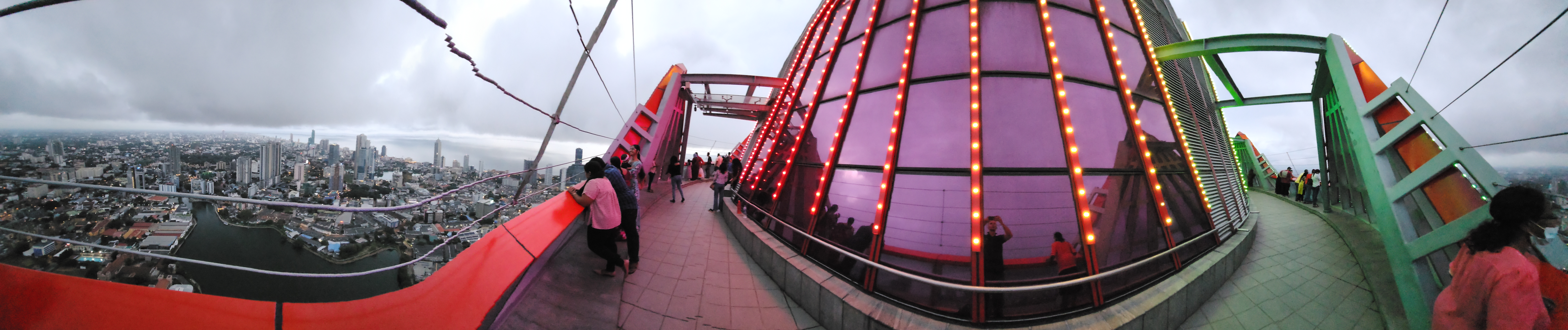
Lotus Tower Observation Deck
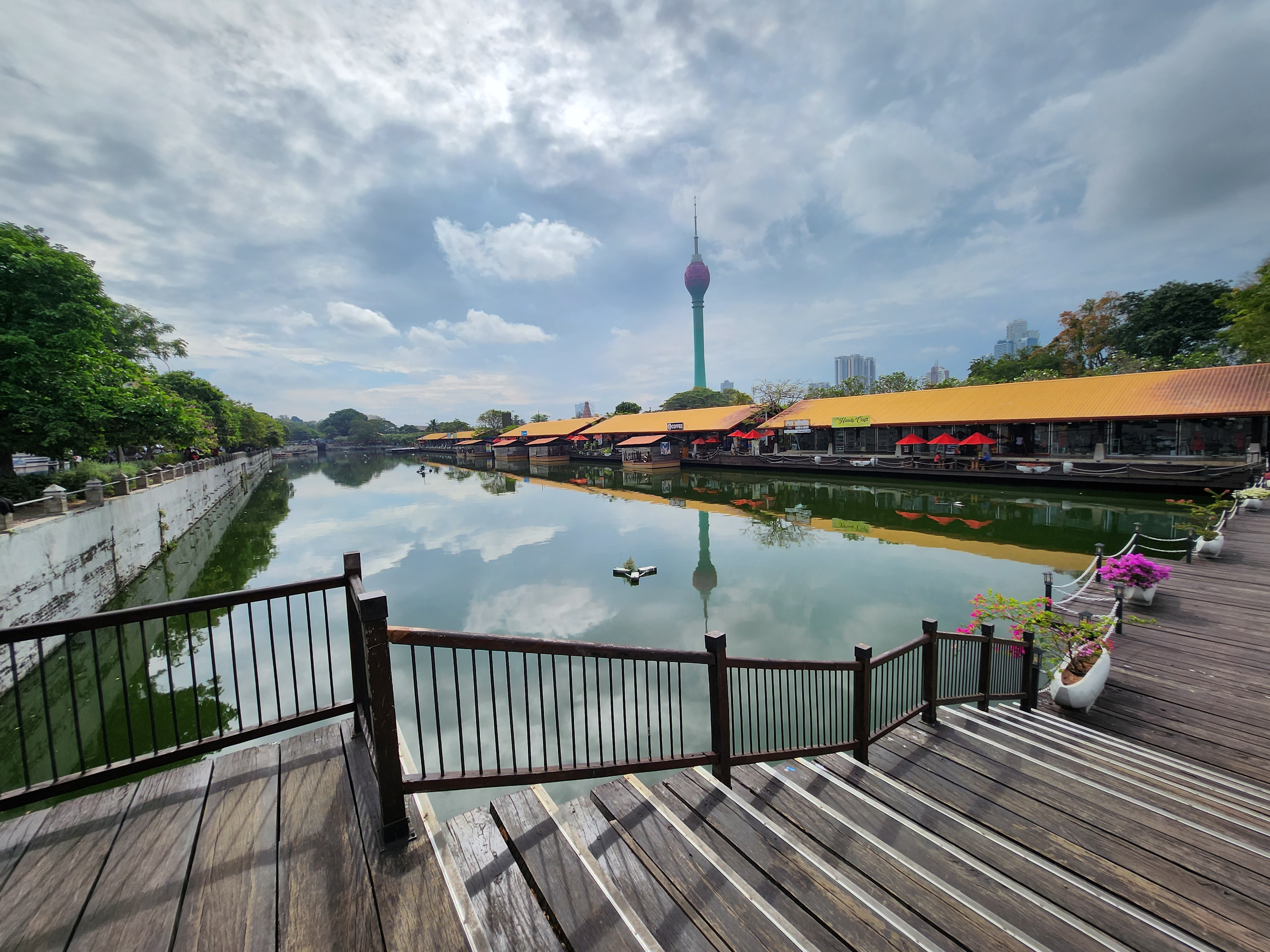
Lotus Tower from Pettah Floating Market in 2023

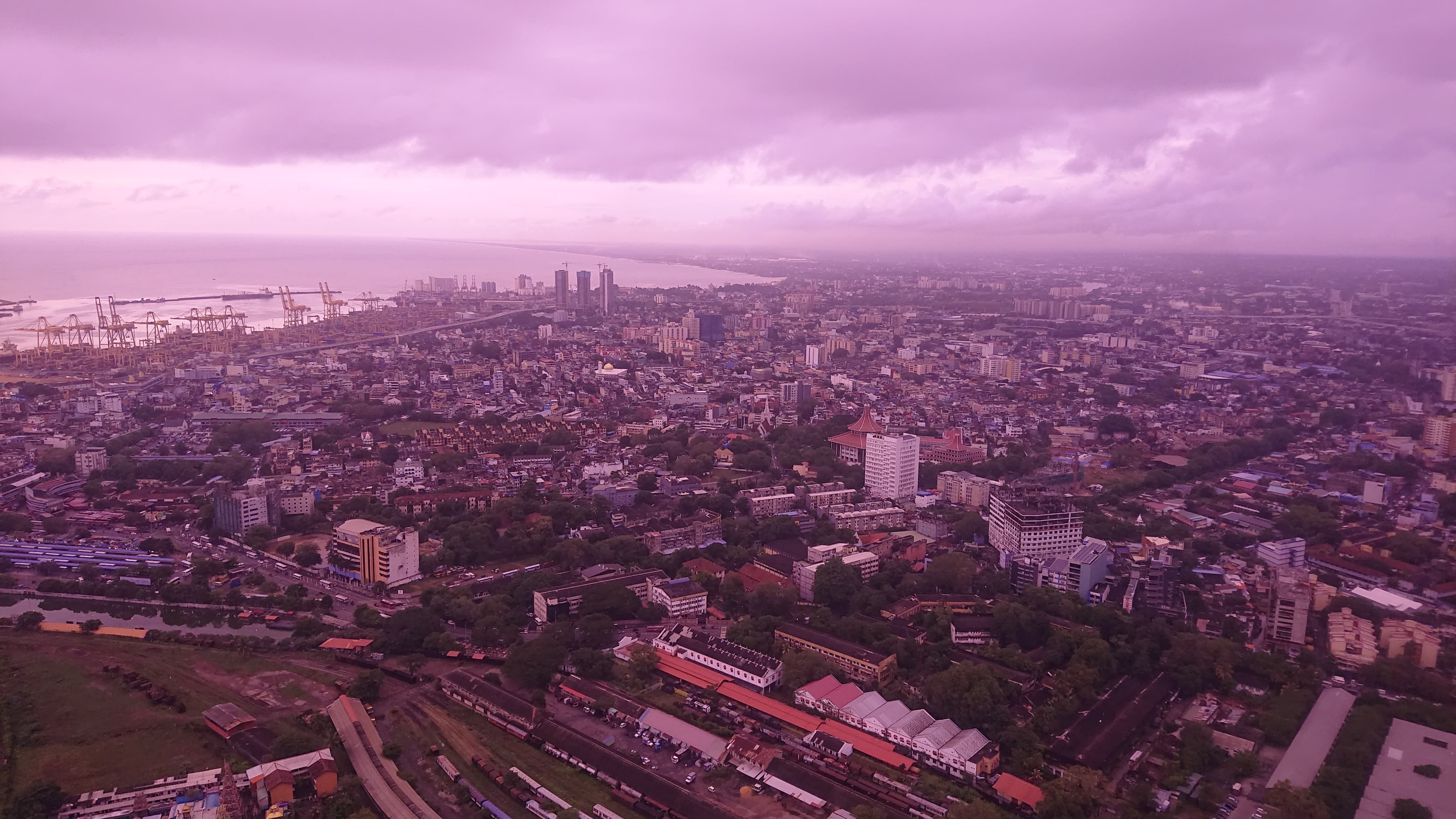
View of the Colombo City through the Pink-tinted glass of the Banquet Hall on the Fourth Floor

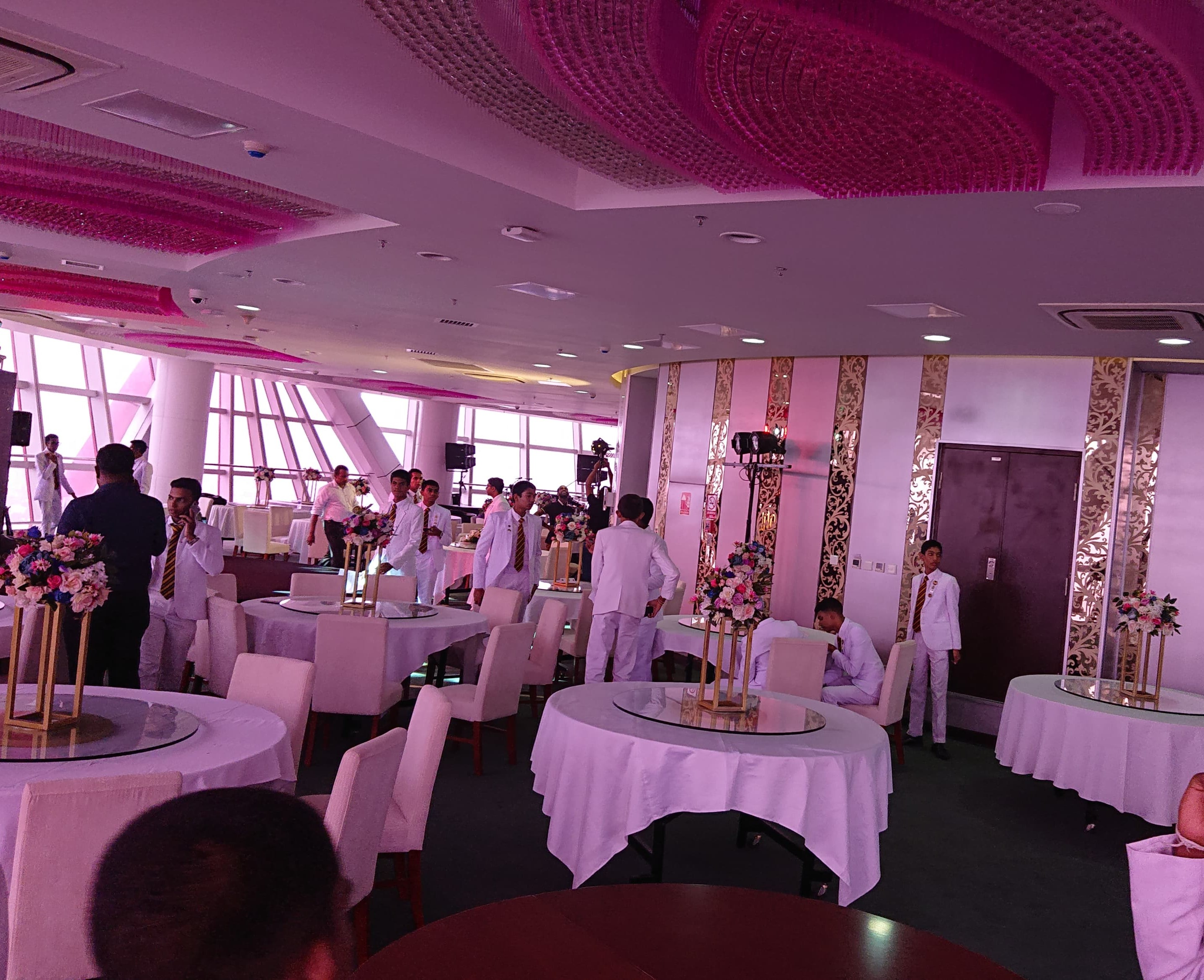
Inside of the Banquet Hall on the Fourth Floor with Pink-tinted glass

== See also ==
- Nelum Pokuna Mahinda Rajapaksa Theatre
- List of tallest structures in Sri Lanka
- Blue Orbit Restaurant (Revolving restaurant)
