= John Monash Scholars =

Postgraduate scholarship in Australia

The General Sir John Monash Foundation
- Named after: General Sir John Monash GCMG, KCB, VD
- Formation: 2001
- Type: Not for Profit
- Legal status: Deductible Gift Recipient (DGR1)
- Headquarters: Melbourne, Australia
- Services: Postgraduate Scholarships for study outside of Australia
- Patron-in-Chief: Her Excellency The Honourable Sam Mostyn AC
- Chairman: Ms Jillian Segal AO
- CEO: Mr Ross Youngman
- Website: www.johnmonash.com

John Monash Scholars are recipients of a prestigious postgraduate scholarship awarded to outstanding Australians with leadership potential who wish to study at any university overseas. The John Monash Scholarship is Australia's only civic funded Scholarship, with awards being facilitated by the Australian Federal Government, State Governments, corporations like Commonwealth Bank, Rio Tinto, and BHP.

== History ==
The General Sir John Monash Foundation was established in 2001 with an initial contribution from the Australian Federal Government together with further contributions from corporate and private sponsors and donors. The first John Monash Scholarships were awarded in 2004 to a total of eight Scholars. Recipients of the John Monash Scholarships are recognised as John Monash Scholars. As of December 2022, 248 John Monash Scholars have been selected, all of whom possess significant leadership potential, are outstanding in their chosen fields and aspire to make the world a better place. The Foundation is named after General Sir John Monash GCMG KCB VD.

The mission of the Foundation is "to invest in outstanding Australians from all fields of endeavour who demonstrate remarkable qualities of leadership and have the ability to deliver outcomes and inspire others for the benefit of Australia".

== Criteria and selection process ==
John Monash Scholarships are open to outstanding Australians with demonstrated leadership skills who are studying or working in areas of potential benefit to Australia. The Scholarship is publicised at all Australian universities to highlight the opportunity it offers for recipients to undertake postgraduate studies at an international institution.

=== Criteria ===
In awarding the John Monash Scholarships, factors considered include:

- Australian citizenship;
- Outstanding intellect – demonstrated by academic excellence (having completed or about to complete a university degree or degrees with outstanding results); excellence can also be demonstrated through language skills, musical skills and/or publications;
- Leadership – demonstrated and potential – within or outside of an applicant's field of study or professional field; Citizenship – community service;
- Program – a defined research project or study programme to be conducted at an overseas university;
- Proposed career trajectory – a credible and concrete pathway, addressing an issue the applicant is passionate about which is of benefit to Australia;
- Referee reports supporting the applicant's profile.

The John Monash Scholarships are not restricted by, age, gender, field of study or choice of overseas institution.

=== Selection process ===
The initial selection process involves an assessment of all written applications. Applicants successful in the initial review are then interviewed by Selection Panels at the State level, followed by the National level. Panels are composed of high-calibre members drawn from academia, industry, government and community organisations. Following this stringent assessment process, the National Selection Panel recommends candidates to the General Sir John Monash Foundation Board for endorsement as recipients of the John Monash Scholarships.

== Recipients ==
=== Scholar fields and locations ===
John Monash Scholars are working and studying in their fields of expertise in Australia and around the world. In November 2022, 15 individuals were announced as John Monash Scholars to commence their studies in 2023, bringing the total number of John Monash Scholars to date to 248. John Monash Scholars are currently studying throughout the world at institutions in the UK, USA, Europe, Asia, Canada and New Zealand. John Monash Scholarships are not restricted by field of study and as such the range of disciplines of the John Monash Scholars is very diverse and includes medicine, law, social science, science and Technology, economics and finance, sustainability, engineering, humanities, arts, education, mathematics, defence and cyber security.

=== Notable scholars ===
Many John Monash scholars are already having an impact in Australia and abroad.

- Associate Professor Mark Dawson (2006 John Monash Scholar) is Head of the Mark Dawson Laboratory and Consultant Haematologist and Head of Cancer Epigenetics Laboratory at Peter MacCallum Cancer Centre. Dawson has commenced an international treatment trial which is the result of his commitment to nearly a decade of research. The trial will focus on the treatment of acute myeloid leukaemia, a rare blood cancer. It is being conducted both in Australia and internationally.
- Major General Roger Noble (2008 John Monash Scholar) completed his Masters of International Public Policy at Johns Hopkins University in the US in 2009. His focus was on strategy in conflict management. Noble was the first member of the Australian military to receive a John Monash Scholarship. On his return from the US, Noble was promoted to brigadier in 2010, commanded the 3rd Brigade based in Far North Queensland from 2013 to 2015, and advanced to major general in 2017.
- Squadron Leader Chris Lowe (2012 John Monash Scholar) completed a Masters of Science in Aeronautics and Astronautics at the Massachusetts Institute of Technology in the US in 2014. During his studies, Lowe conducted research into the integration of unmanned aircraft systems into non-segregated civil airspace. A member of the Royal Australian Air Force since 2005, he has served in operations in Kandahar, Afghanistan. He is currently working within Air Force Headquarters to address and resolve a range of policy, regulatory, technical, operational and legal issues that will permit the normalisation of unmanned aviation across Australia and internationally.
- Fergus Green (2012 John Monash Scholar) is a widely published authority on Australian and international climate change policy. His paper "China's 'New Normal': Structural Change, Better Growth, and Peak Emissions", co-authored with Lord Nicholas Stern of the Grantham Research Institute on Climate Change and The Environment, received over 600 media mentions globally. Green is a regular commentator on the issue and has spoken at conferences around the world.
- Catherine Drummond (2014 John Monash Scholar) has worked in international law for a firm in Paris, for the United Nations International Criminal Tribunal in Rwanda and for the Queensland Court of Appeal. She was nominated for Australian of the Year in 2012 for leading community initiatives that promote human rights, and in 2015 won the prestigious Whewell Scholarship in International Law, awarded by Cambridge University.
- Dr Phoebe Williams (2015 John Monash Scholar) has stated:
  I plan to use my John Monash Scholarship to travel to Kenya to work with the University of Oxford's research unit. My aim is to help identify the best and most effective way to administer oxygen therapy to critically ill and malnourished children. This is a really important project because it has the potential to change the way oxygen therapy is administered worldwide, including to children who are admitted to hospitals in Australia. I am absolutely thrilled to have been given this opportunity.
  Other noteworthy scholars include:
  - Lara Olsen (2004), Tesla Motors; formerly head of strategy at CitiPower and Powercor, chief executive of Coolnrg International
  - Danielle Malek Roosa (2004), senior legal counsel, The World Bank Group
  - Andrew Hudson (2005), executive director, Crisis Action
  - Dr Matthew Baker (2005), postdoctoral research assistant at Victor Chang Cardiac Research Institute; ABC Radio National 2015 Top 5 Scientist under 40
  - Hugh Evans (2008), 2004 Young Australian of the Year and CEO of the Global Poverty Project
  - Dr Alice Chang (2008), child and adolescent psychiatrist at Cairns & Hinterland Hospital and Health Service; 2015 John Monash Oration Key Note Speaker
  - David Smerdon (2011), an Australian chess grandmaster and economist; lecturer at the University of Queensland
  - Madeline Gleeson (2012), research associate, Andrew & Renata Kaldor Centre for International Refugee Law at UNSW
  - Sarah Lux Lee (2014), Master of Public Administration, Columbia University; one of The Australian Financial Review and Westpac's 2014 100 Women of Influence
  - Dinesh Palipana (2024), quadriplegic doctor and lawyer

== Governance ==
All state Governors serve as Patrons of the General Sir John Monash Foundation, with the Governor-General serving as Patron-in-Chief.
