= Citrus Leisure =

Hospitality company in Sri Lanka

Citrus Leisure PLC
- Type: Public
- Traded as: CSE: REEF.N0000
- ISIN: LK0083N00002
- Industry: Hospitality
- Founded: December 5, 1973; 52 years ago
- Headquarters: Colombo, Sri Lanka
- Key people: E. P. A. Cooray (Chairman); P. C. B. Talwatte (CEO); Dilith Jayaweera (Director); Varuni Fernando (Director)
- Revenue: ▲LKR1,625 million (2023)
- Operating income: ▲LKR(214) million (2023)
- Net income: ▼LKR(1,437) million (2023)
- Total assets: ▲LKR9,992 million (2023)
- Total equity: ▼LKR3,361 million (2023)
- Owners: George Steuart & Co Ltd (75.16%); Divasa Equity (9.85%); Vallibel One (3.13%)
- Number of employees: 26 (2023)
- Parent: George Steuart Group
- Subsidiaries: Hikkaduwa Beach Resort PLC (82.86%); Waskaduwa Beach Resort PLC 74.55%; Citrus Silver Ltd (100%)
- Website: www.citrusleisure.com

Citrus Leisure PLC is a hotel chain in Sri Lanka. The hospitality company owns and operates Citrus Waskaduwa, Citrus Hikkaduwa and the Steuart by Citrus. The company was incorporated as Hotel Reefcomber Limited in 1973. In 2010, the company was rebranded as Citrus Leisure when Dilith Jayaweera and Varuni Fernando of Triad Advertising bought a stake in the company. In 1984, the company was quoted on the Colombo Stock Exchange.

== History ==
Citrus Hikkaduwa was incorporated in 1973 as Hotel Reefcomber Limited. Hotel Reefcomber was listed on the Colombo Stock Exchange in 1984. The hotel company was rebranded as Citrus Leisure PLC in 2010. Sri Lankan entrepreneur, Dhammika Perera acquired the hotel in 2004 for LKR26 million. Perera divested the hotel for LKR328 million in 2010. Dilith Jayaweera and Varuni Fernando of Triad Advertising acquired a stake in the company in the same year. The Criminal Investigation Department opened an investigation in 2013 on a land purchase by Citrus Leisure in 2013. Citrus Leisure purchased land in Pasikudah for LKR139 million for a new resort called Passikudah Beach Resort. The ownership of the land was disputed in court by two Swiss nationals. The company resolved the dispute with a payment of LKR80 million to the party who instituted the legal dispute.

=== Kalpitiya Beach Resort ===
Citrus Leisure applied for listings on the Colombo Stock Exchange for two of its subsidiaries, Waskaduwa Beach Resort and Kalpitiya Beach Resort in February 2011. Kalpitiya Beach Resort's IPO oversubscribed 2.3 times while Waskaduwa Beach Resort's IPO oversubscribed by 3.4 times. Building Citrus Kalpitiya was delayed in 2013. Initially, Kalpitiya Beach Resort PLC was planned to build a 150-roomed, four-star resort and 50 villas. The number of villas planned to build was lowered to 32 in 2013. The lack of infrastructure such as roads and pipe-borne water that the government promised to develop was cited as the cause of the delay.

The Securities and Exchange Commission of Sri Lanka ordered Kalpitiya Beach Resort to call an extraordinary general meeting. The Commission expressed "grave concern" that the company has not built the resort within the time stipulated in the IPO. The Commission ordered the company to reveal its true financial position to the shareholders and pass an alternative course of action. The company issued a clarification regarding a statement made by prime minister Ranil Wickremesinghe in the parliament.

=== Restructuring ===
In September 2016, Citrus Leisure underwent a corporate restructuring. Waskaduwa, Kalpitiya resorts and privately held Passikudah Beach Resort were placed under Hikkaduwa Beach Resort. In 2018, Citrus Leisure decided to abandon the plans to develop the Kalpitiya Resort. The company stated the capital would be employed to settle the debts of the company. Following the merger of Kalpitiya Beach Resort with Hikkaduwa Beach Resort, the Colombo Stock Exchange decided to delist Kalpitiya Beach Resort in 2018. Citrus Leisure opened Ceylon Curry Club, a Sri Lankan contemporary food restaurant in the Dutch Hospital, Colombo. Citrus Leisure opened Blue Orbit, Sri Lanka's first and only revolving restaurant, and South Asia's tallest restaurant at Colombo Lotus Tower.

== Properties ==
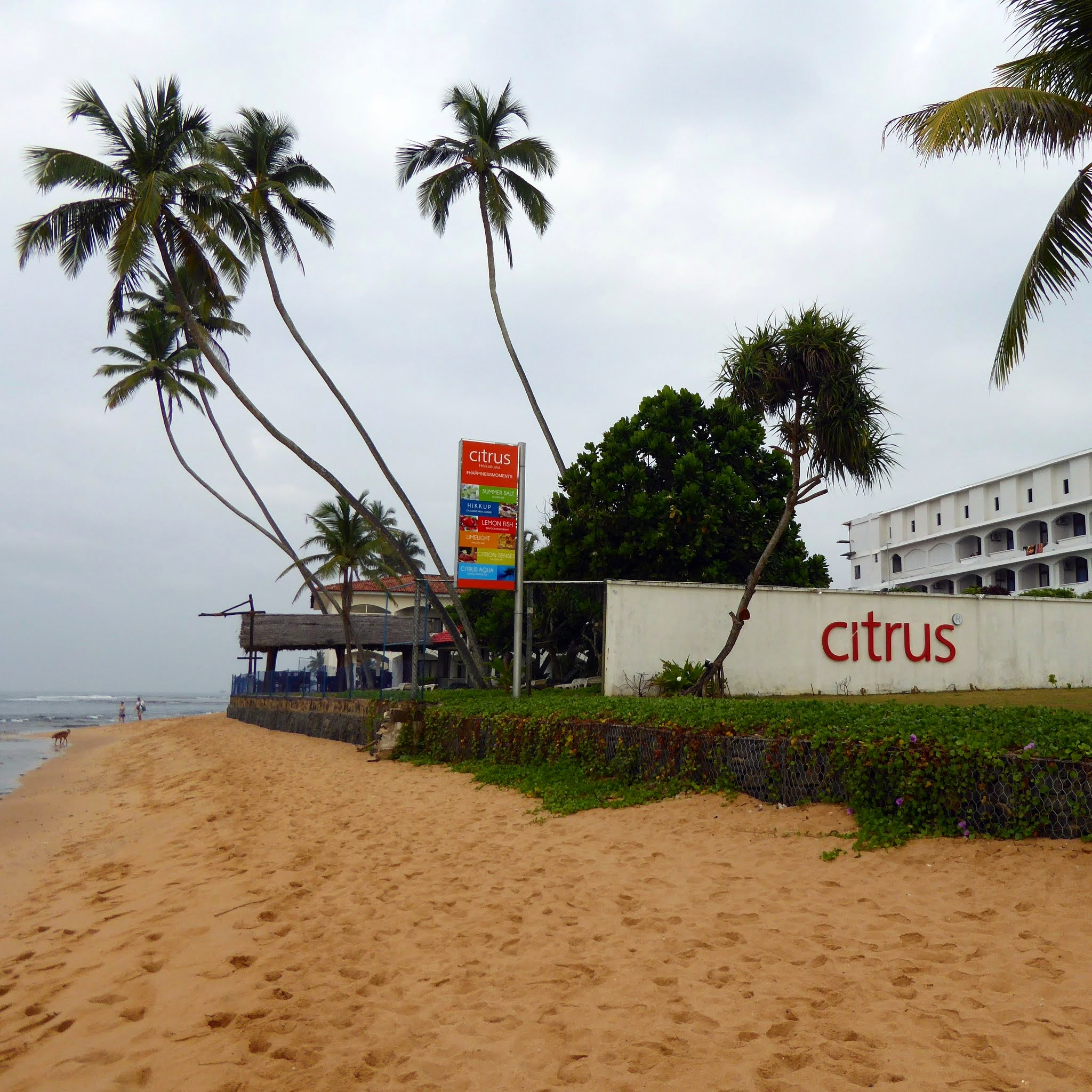
The beachfront of Citrus Hikkaduwa

Citrus Waskaduwa is a 150-roomed five-star resort in Waskaduwa. The hotel commenced operations in April 2014 with the participation of president Mahinda Rajapaksa. Citrus Hikkaduwa is formerly known as Hotel Reefcomber. Hotel Reefcomber opened in 1973. The hotel was relaunched as Citrus Hikkaduwa in January 2012. Citrus Hikkaduwa consists of 100 rooms and is located in Hikkaduwa. In 2015, the 175 year-old Steuart House in Colombo Fort was converted into a city hotel. George Steuart Group, the parent company of Citrus Leisure, leased the property to Citrus Silver Ltd to operate a 50-roomed, Scottish-themed hotel. The hotel was named the Steuart by Citrus. The rooms of the hotel are named after Scottish toponyms.

== See also ==
- List of companies listed on the Colombo Stock Exchange
