= George Steuart Group =

- Type: Privately held
- Industry: various
- Founded: 1835; 191 years ago
- Headquarters: Colombo, Sri Lanka
- Key people: Sarva Ameresekere (Chairman)
- Products: Health; Tea; Citrus - Leisure; Travel; Consumer; Recruitment; Industrial Solutions; Investments; Aviation; Insurance Brokers; Optimize; Laboratories; Seri Naturals

George Steuart Group of Companies (George Steuarts) is Sri Lanka's oldest mercantile establishment, having been established in 1835 during British occupation of Ceylon. It is the oldest surviving mercantile firm in the country, with a recorded history dating back to the early 19th century, and is the first on the register of companies in Sri Lanka

Having begun operations as a merchant banker and then a produce broker, George Steuarts today includes businesses engaged in tea, exports, health, leisure, travel, real estate, telecommunications, shipping, insurance, solutions, recruitment and higher education.

== History ==
The Company traces its origins to Captain James Steuart (1790-1870), a British sea captain, who sailed the southern seas in the early 1800s and settled in Ceylon in 1818. Seeing the commercial potential of the island, Captain Steuart set himself up as merchant and banker. Steuart was subsequently appointed "Master Attendant of the Roads of Colombo", a position which precluded him from continuing his commercial activities. As a result, he invited his younger brother George (1808-1896), to take over the business, which in 1835 resulted in the establishment of George Steuart and Company.

In the late 1830s and early 1840s Ceylon became a major producer of coffee and the company became a large scale exporter of the commodity. In 1863 John Lewis Gordon took over the company. From 1869 Ceylon's coffee industry was decimated by coffee rust that afflicted its plantations; George Steuart was amongst the pioneers that converted their export interests to tea, supporting an industry that would soon become synonymous with Ceylon.

George Steuart 1808 - 1896

James Steuart 1790 - 1870

The descendants of the Steuart Brothers incorporated George Steuart & Co in 1954, building a high-rise office building "Steuart House" at 14 Queen Street, Colombo fort, which became the company headquarters.

In 1975, the Sri Lankan government launched a nationalisation programme of privately held tea plantations; which led to the take-over of 90% of the group's holdings, the largest acreage of tea plantations at the time. As a result, the company proceeded on a path of diversification, expanding into textile production, automotive spare parts, gem exports, telecommunications and jewellery manufacturing, thereby reducing its exposure to any single industry. Over the next few decades, the Group expanded its footprint in several industries; as of 2014, major subsidiaries of George Steuarts included GS Health, GS Teas, GS Travel, GS Aviation, GS Finance, GS Solutions, GS Optimize, GS Insurance Brokers and GS Recruitment.

In September 2011 Nimal Perera and Dilith Jayaweera, through his investment company, Divasa Equity Ltd., acquired over 40% of George Steuarts, in a deal worth approximately Rs 1 billion. Divasa subsequently in October increased their stake in the company to a controlling 51% and Perera's holdings increased to 30%. A few months later, Nimal Perera exited George Steuarts, selling his stake to Jayaweera's Divasa Equity.
