= List of hotels: Countries N-O =

This is a list of what are intended to be the notably top hotels by country, five or four star hotels, notable skyscraper landmarks or historic hotels which are covered in multiple reliable publications. It should not be a directory of every hotel in every country:

== Namibia ==
- Windhoek Country Club Resort, Windhoek

== Nauru ==
- Menen Hotel, Anibare Bay
- OD-N-Aiwo Hotel, Aiwo
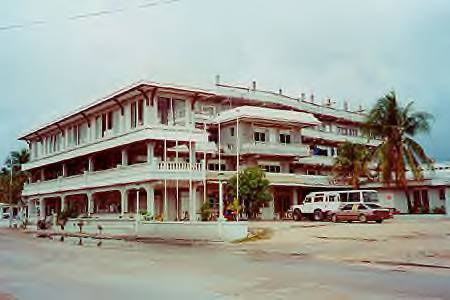
OD-N-Aiwo Hotel

== Nepal ==
- Grand Hotel Kathmandu, Kathmandu
- Hotel Shanker, Kathmandu

== Netherlands ==
- American Hotel, Amsterdam
- Amsterdam Hilton Hotel, Amsterdam
- Apollo Hotel Amsterdam
- Hotel de Bilderberg, Oosterbeek
- Grand Hotel Karel V, Utrecht
- Hotel de l'Europe, Amsterdam
- Hotel de Wereld, Wageningen
- Hotel New York, Rotterdam
- Hotel Pulitzer, Amsterdam
- InterContinental Amstel Amsterdam, Amsterdam
- Landhuishotel Bloemenbeek, De Lutte
- Lauswolt, Beetsterzwaag
- Lloyd Hotel, Amsterdam
- NH Grand Hotel Krasnapolsky, Amsterdam
- Oud Poelgeest, Oegstgeest
- Swissôtel Amsterdam, Amsterdam
- Townhouse Designhotel Maastricht, Maastricht
- YOTEL, Amsterdam
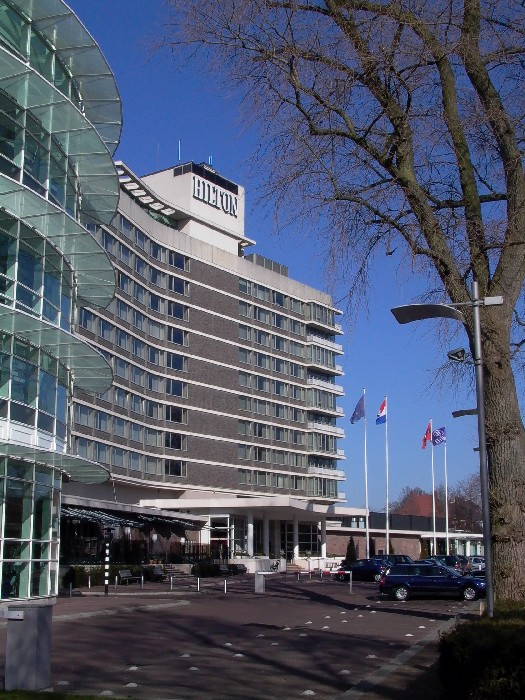
Amsterdam Hilton Hotel

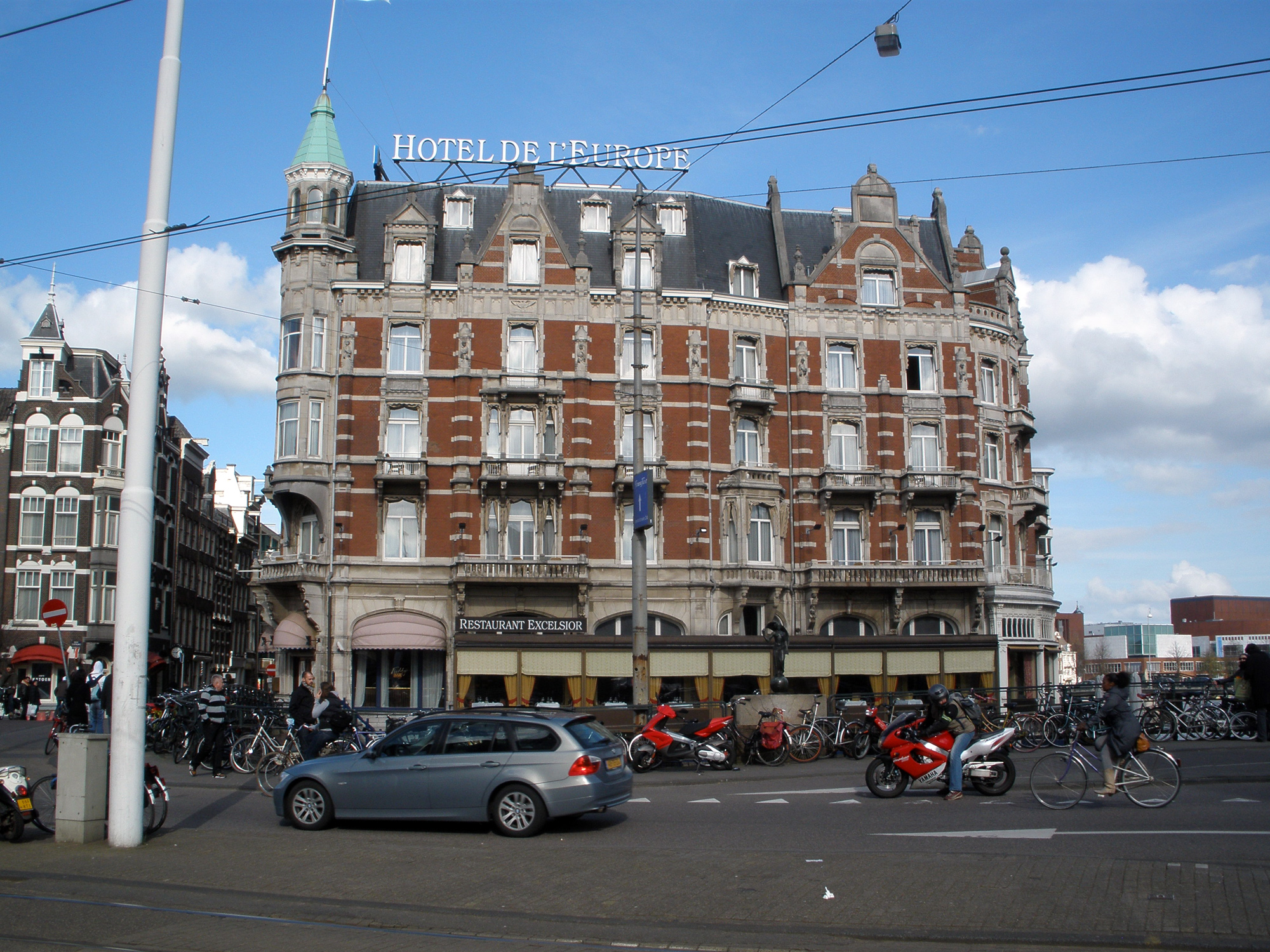
Hotel de l'Europe (Amsterdam)

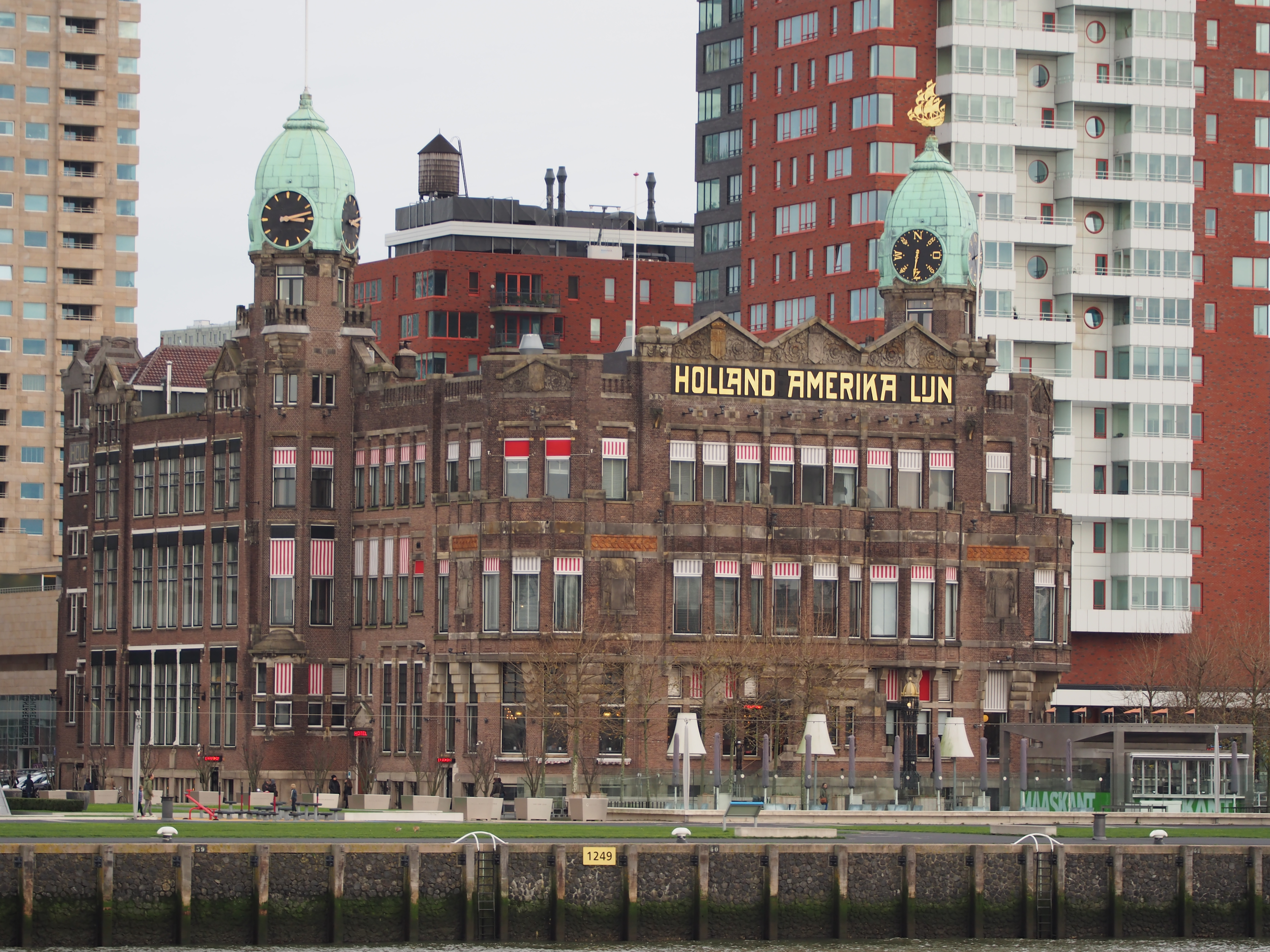
Hotel New York (Rotterdam)

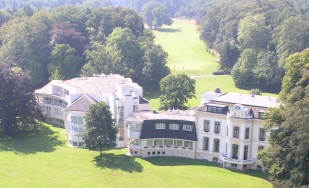
Lauswolt

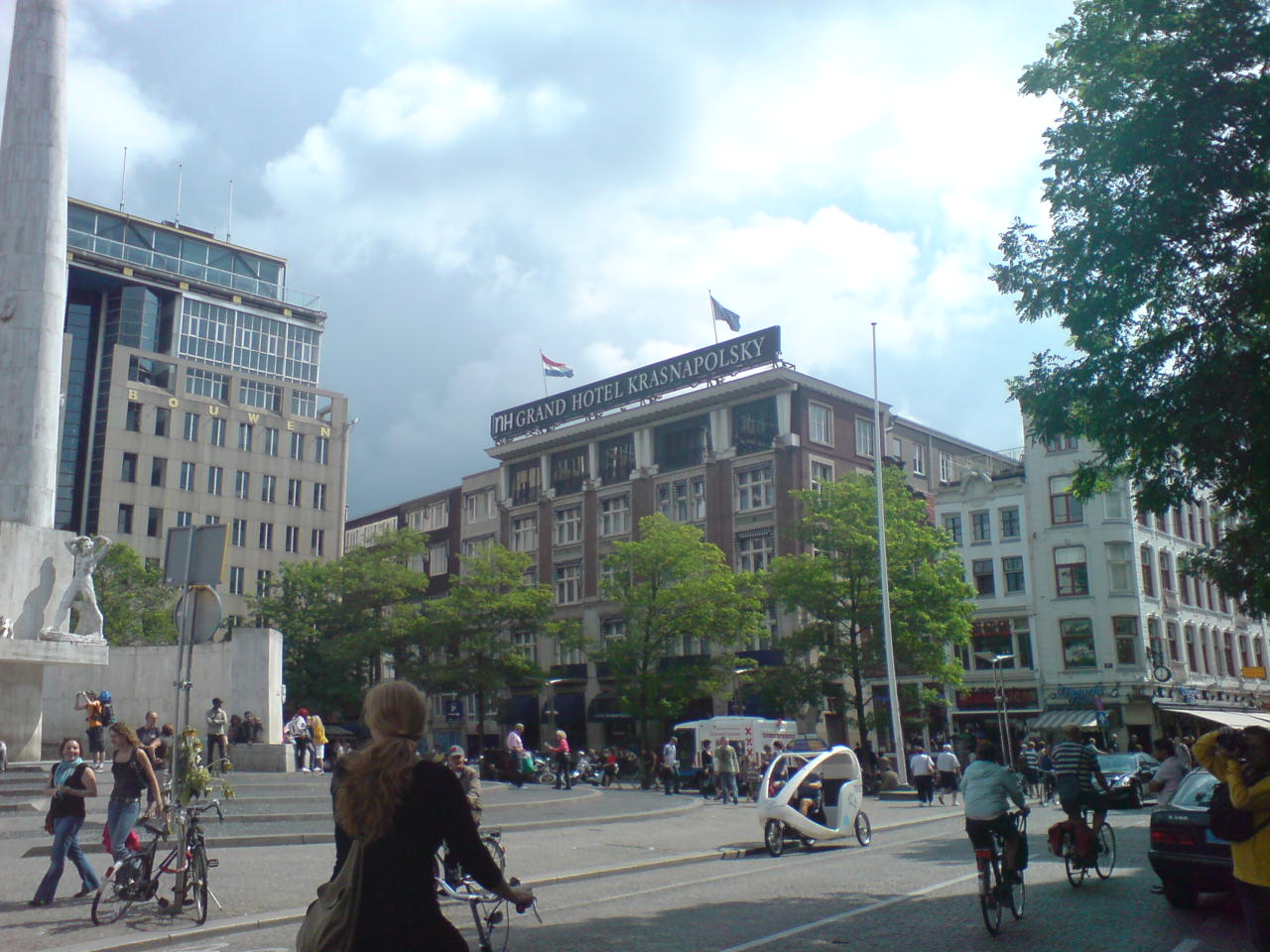
NH Grand Hotel Krasnapolsky

== New Zealand ==
- Eagles Nest, Bay of Islands
- Eichardt's Hotel, Queenstown
- Excelsior Hotel, Christchurch
- Grand Hotel, Auckland
- Langham Hotel, Auckland
- Metropolis, Auckland
- Museum Hotel de Wheels, Wellington
- Princes Wharf, Auckland
- Skycity Auckland, Auckland
- St. George Hotel, Wellington

=== Cook Islands ===
- Aitutaki Lagoon Private Island Resort, Aitutaki

=== Tokelau ===
- Luana Liki Hotel, Nukunonu

== Nicaragua ==
- Santa María de Ostuma, Matagalpa
- Selva Negra Mountain Resort, Matagalpa

== Niger ==
- Taguelmoust, Agadez

== Niue ==
- Niue Hotel

== North Korea ==
- Chongnyon Hotel, P'yongyang
- Kaesong Folk Hotel, Kaesong
- Koryo Hotel, P'yongyang
- Ryugyong Hotel, P'yongyang
- Yanggakdo Hotel, P'yongyang
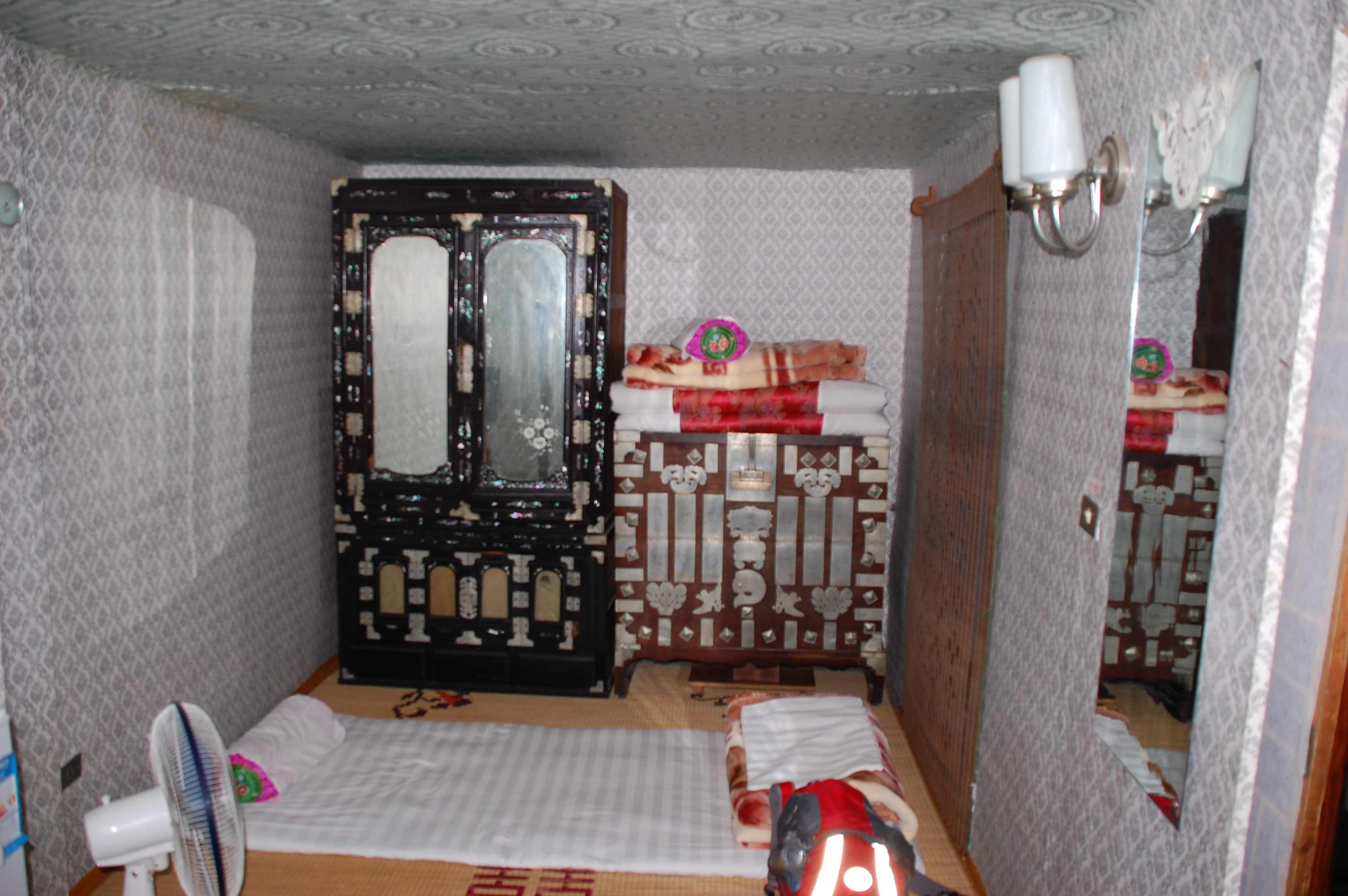
Kaesong Folk Hotel

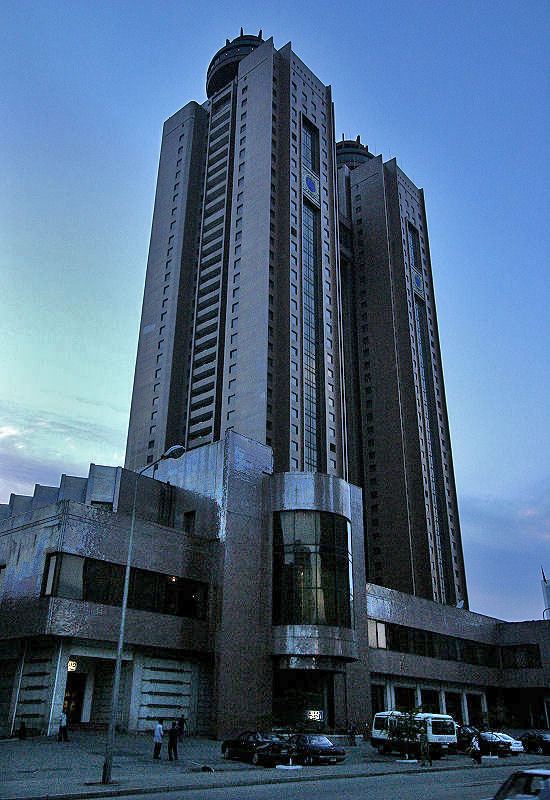
Koryo Hotel

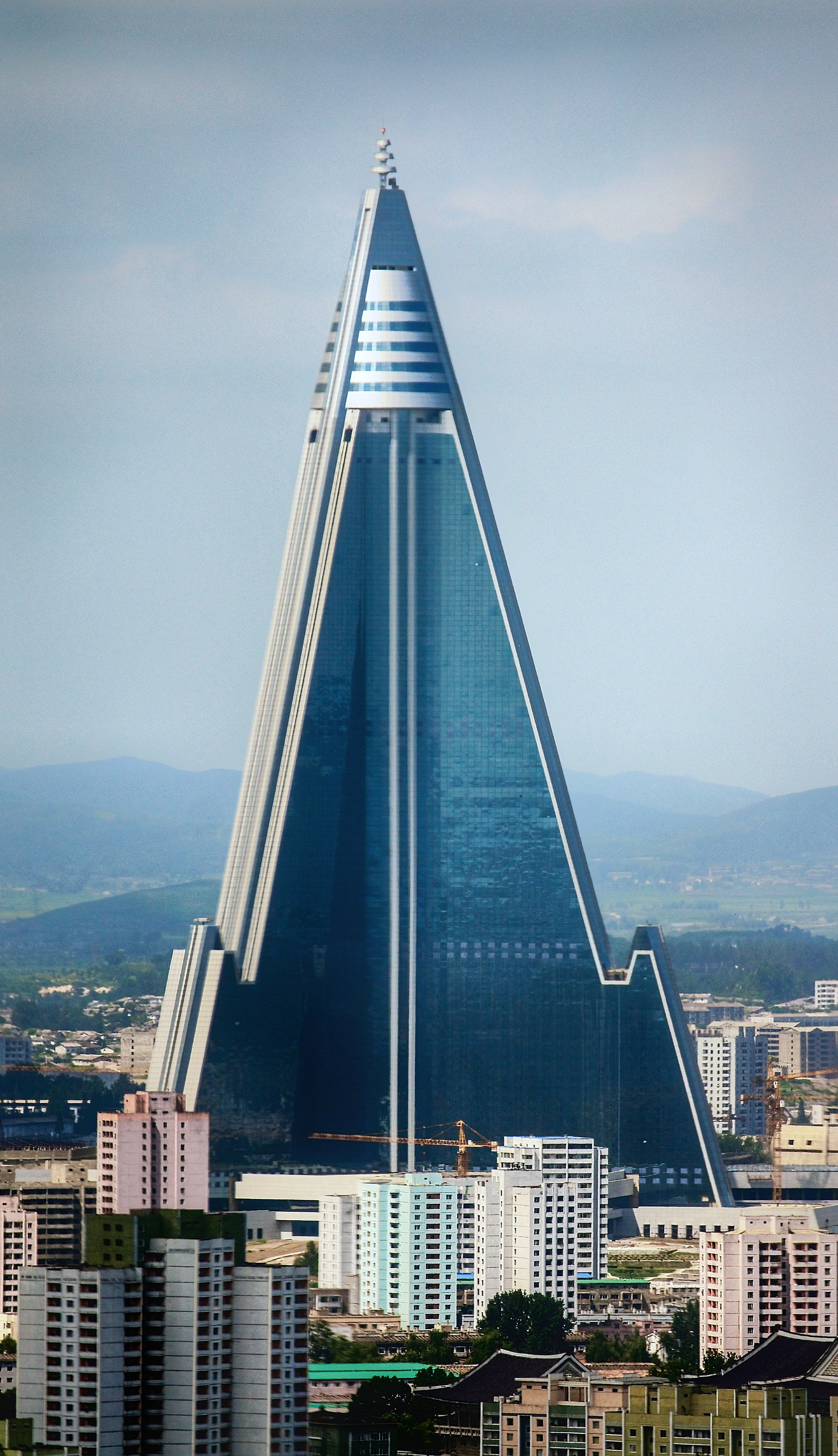
Ryugyong Hotel

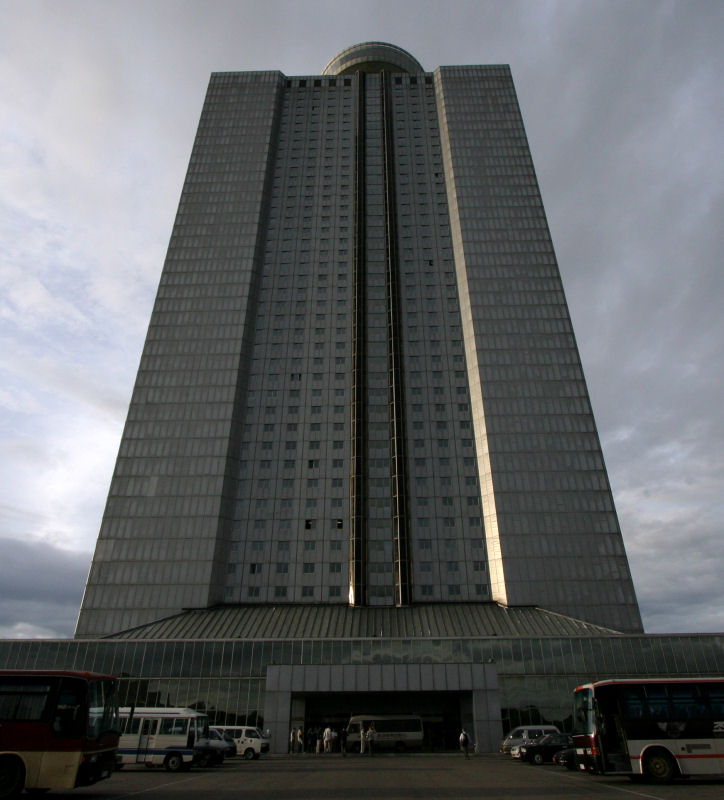
Yanggakdo Hotel

== Norway ==
- Dr. Holms Hotel, Geilo
- Fru Haugans Hotel, Mosjøen
- Grand Hotel, Oslo
- Holmenkollen Park Hotel Rica, Holmenkollen, Oslo
- Hotel Alexandra, Loen
- Hotel Bristol, Oslo
- Hotel Continental, Oslo
- Hotel Royal Christiania, Oslo
- Kongsvoll, Drivdalen valley
- Oslo Plaza, Oslo
- Radisson SAS Scandinavia Hotel Oslo, Oslo
- Refsnes Gods, near Moss
- Rica Seilet Hotel, Molde
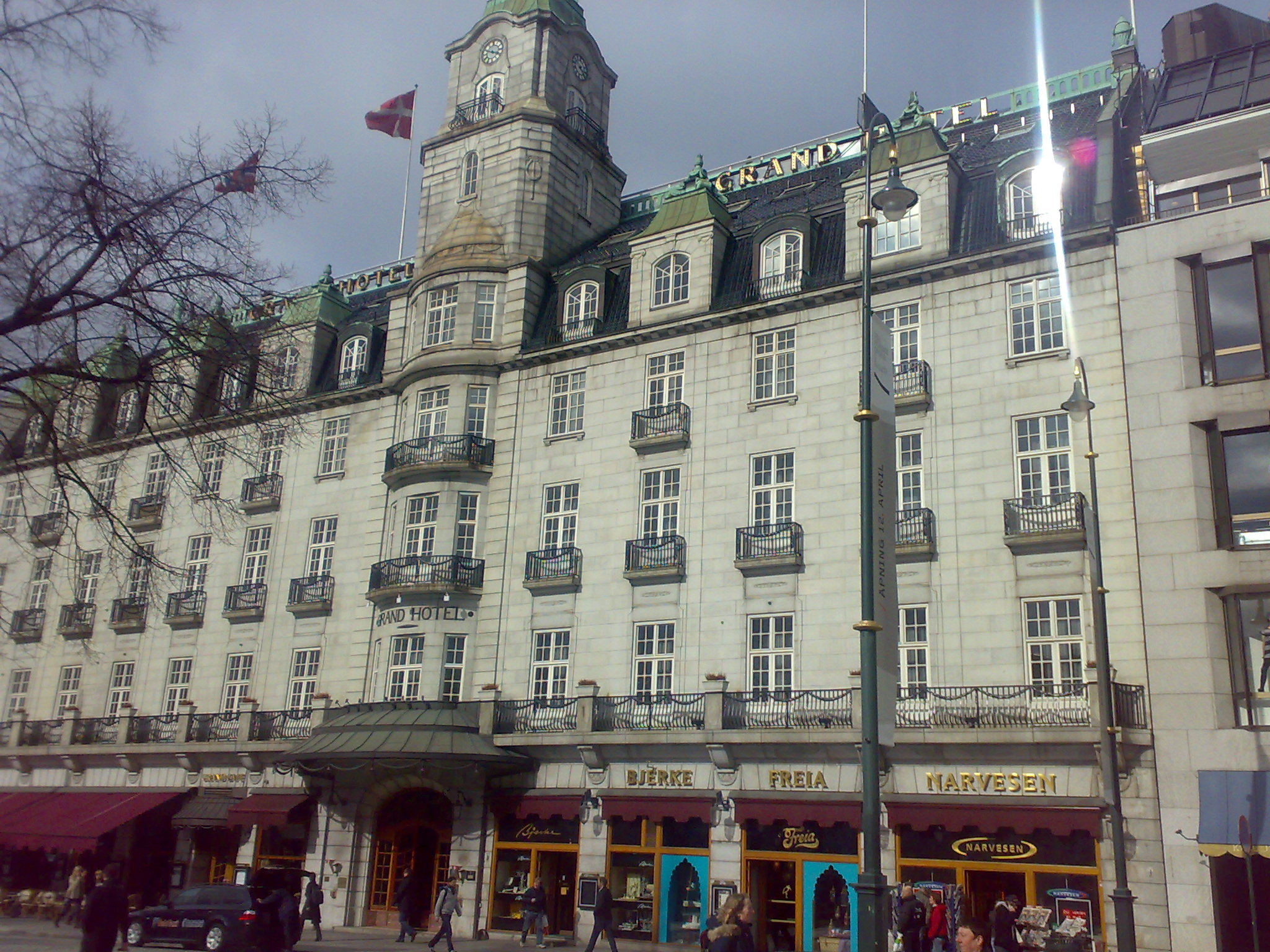
Grand Hotel

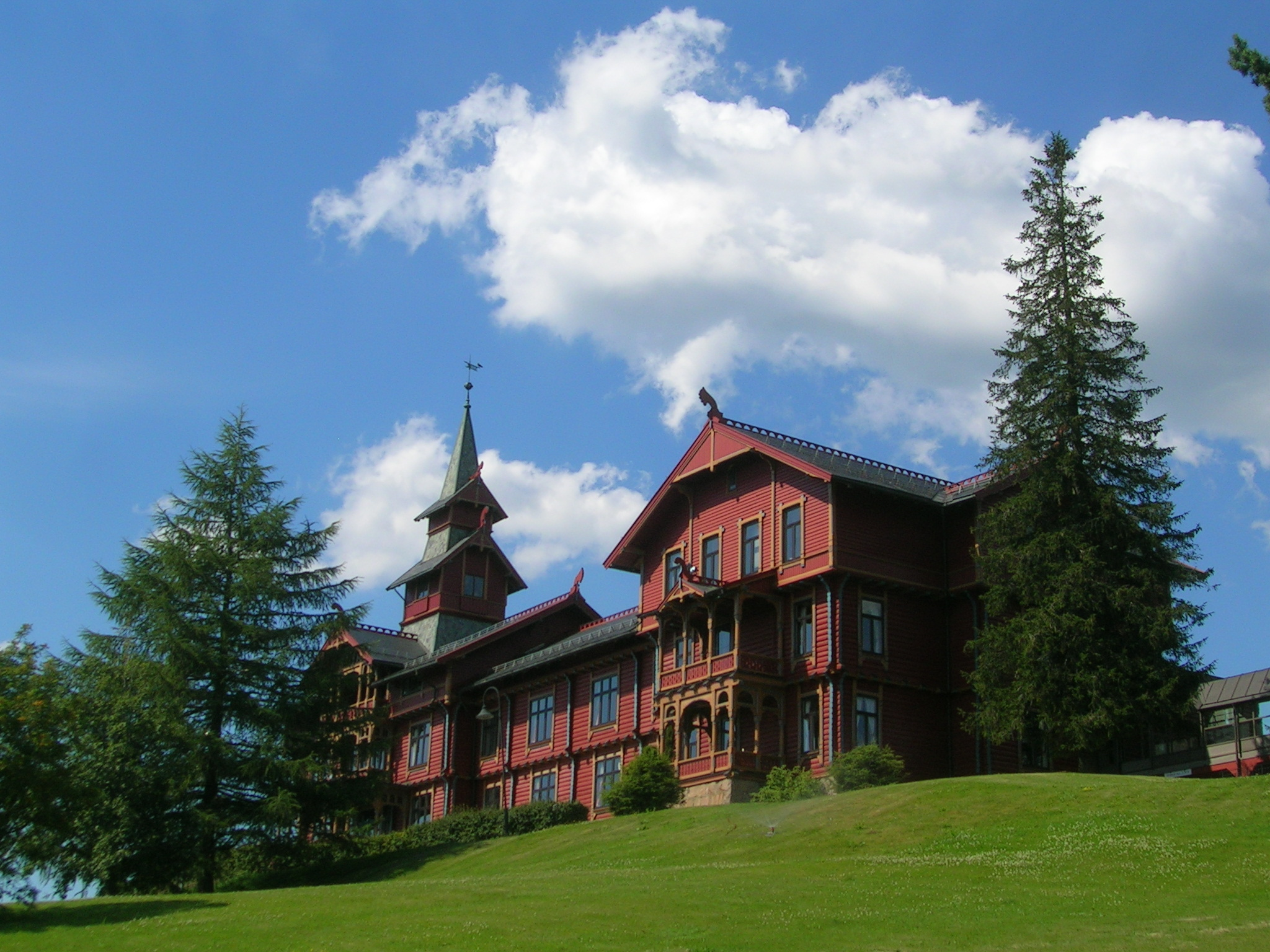
Holmenkollen Park Hotel Rica

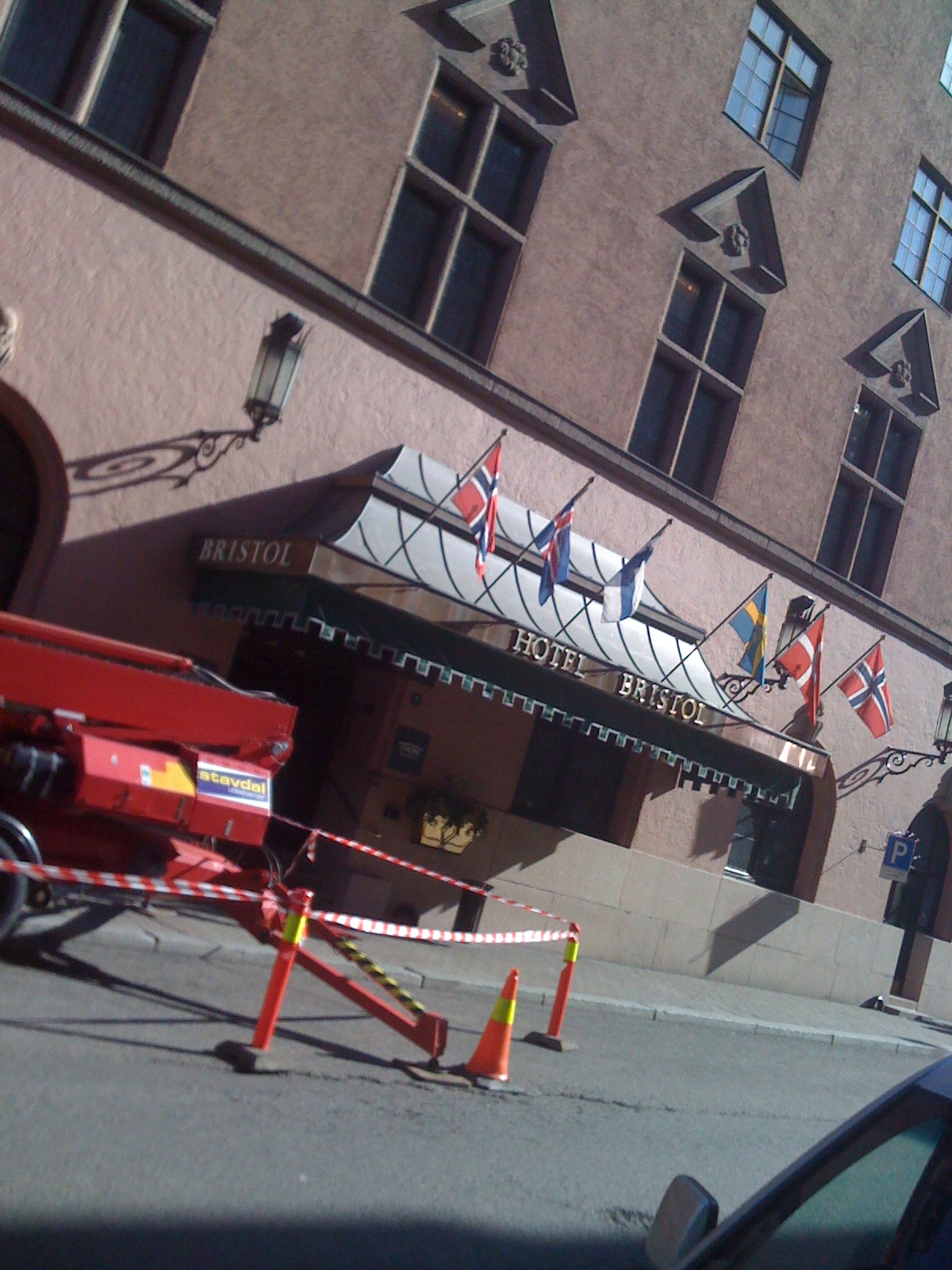
Hotel Bristol (Oslo)

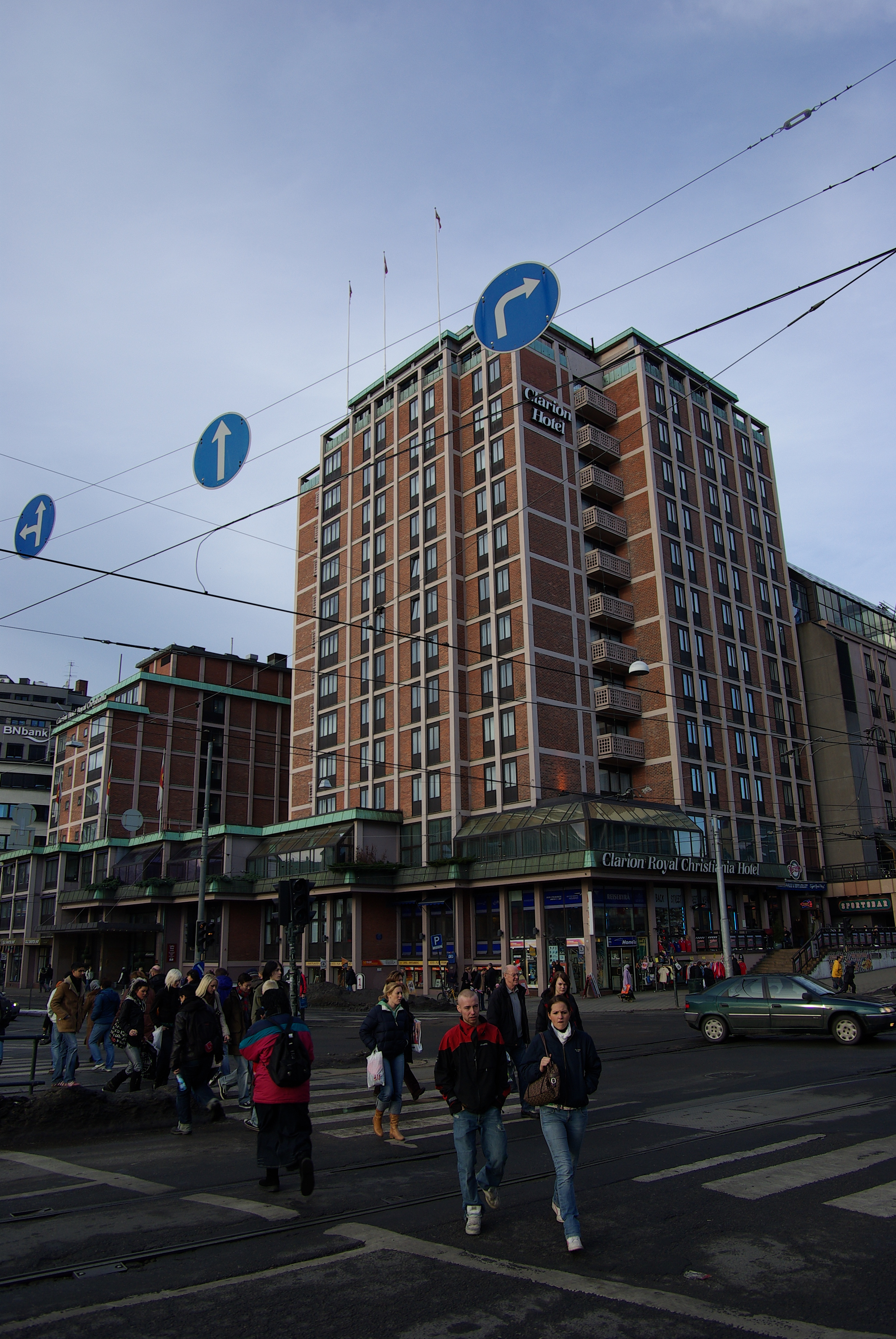
Hotel Royal Christiania

== Oman ==
- Muscat Bay
- Shangri-La's Barr Al Jissah Resort & Spa
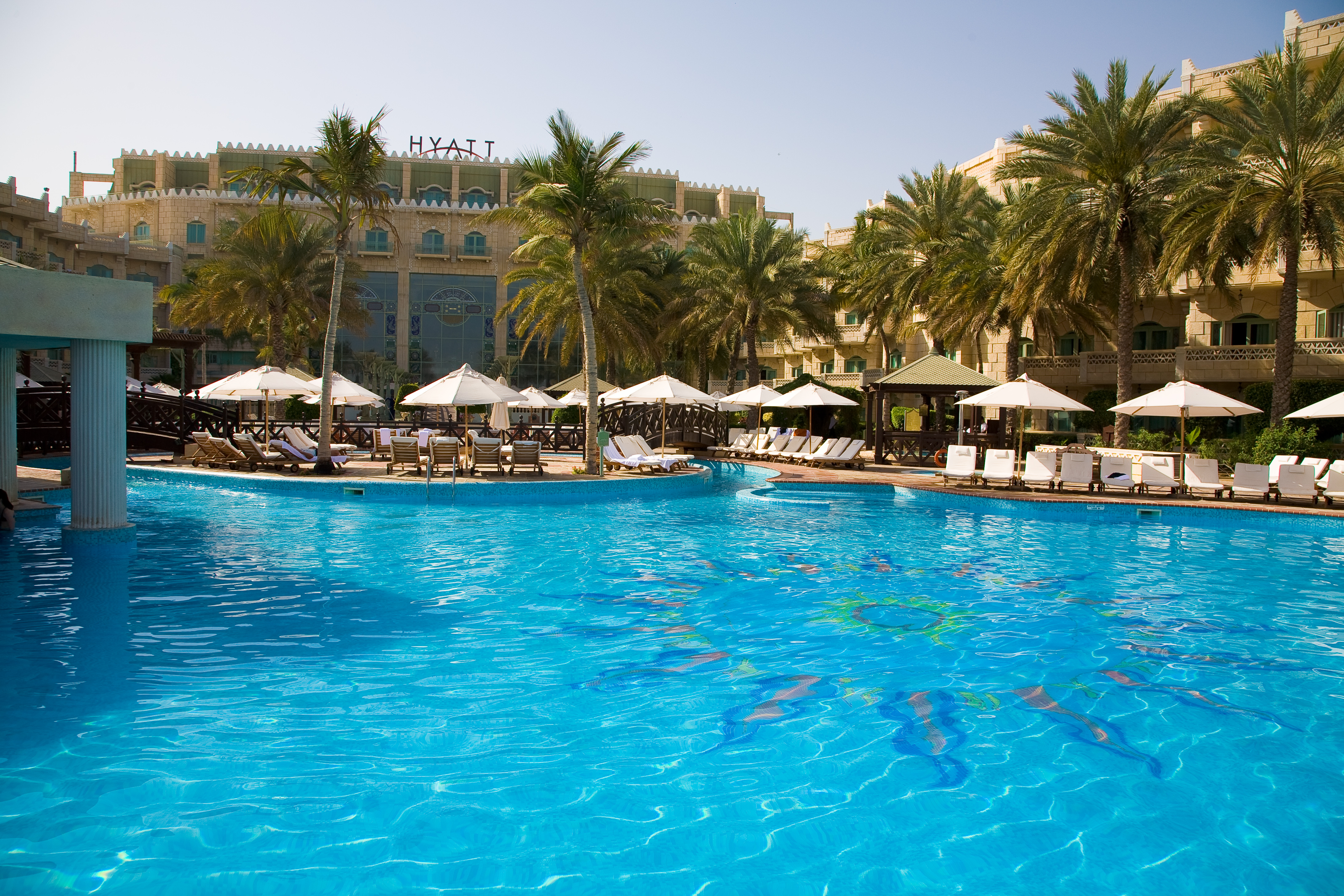
Grand Hyatt Muscat Hotel
