= Halvemaan =

Coordinates: 52°19′42.07″N 4°52′40.39″E

- Interactive map of Halvemaan

Restaurant information
- Established: 1989
- Closed: 2018
- Head chef: John Halvemaan
- Rating: Michelin Guide
- Location: Van Leijenberghlaan 320, Amsterdam, 1082 DD, Netherlands
- Website: Official website

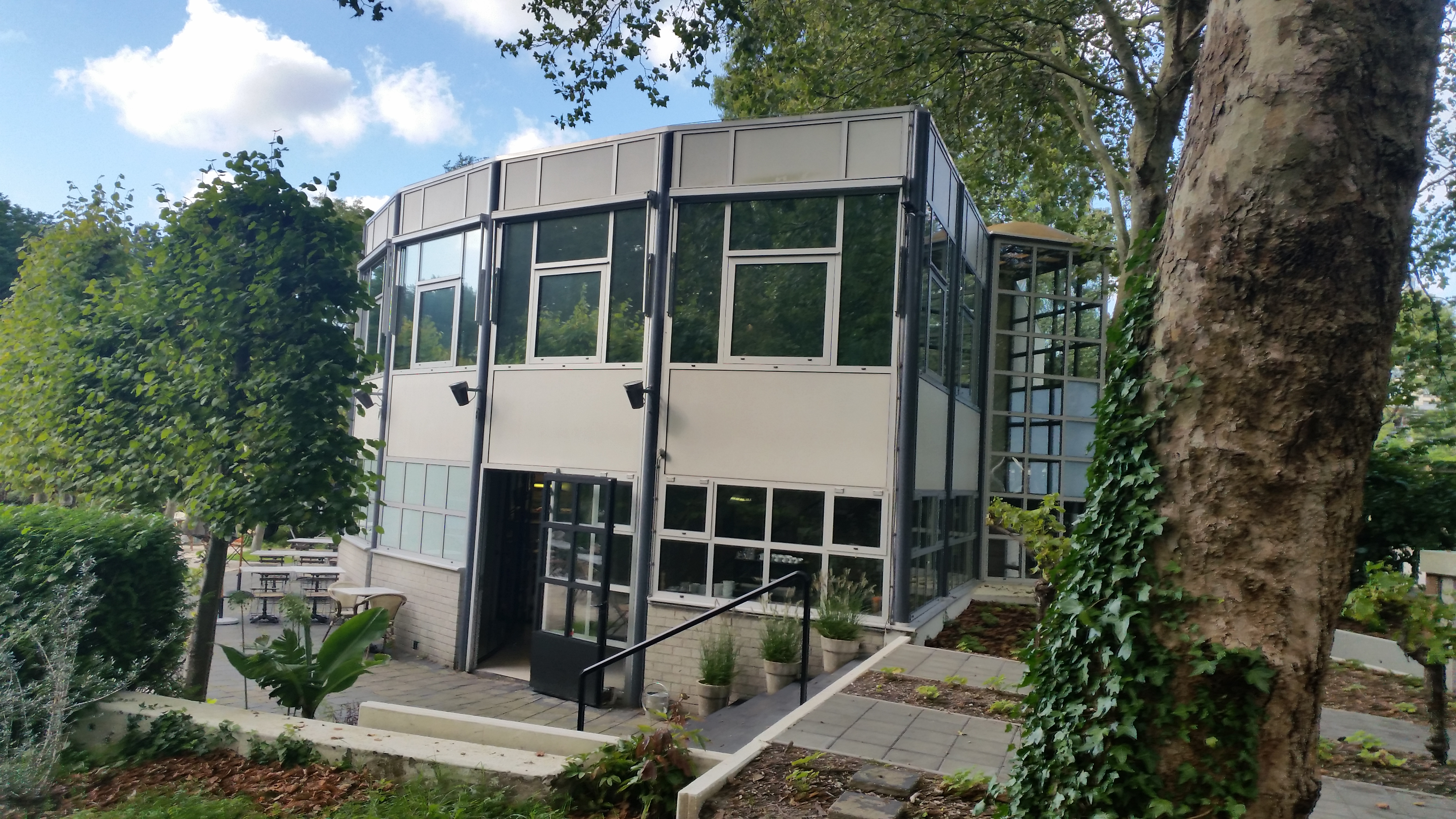
Halvemaan

Restaurant Halvemaan is a former restaurant in Amsterdam, Netherlands. It is a fine dining restaurant that was awarded one Michelin star in 1991 and retained that rating until 1997. The restaurant closed at 28 October 2018.

In 2013, GaultMillau awarded the restaurant 16 out of 20 points.

Owner and head chef of Halvemaan is John Halvemaan.

The building of the restaurant is a purpose built restaurant designed by Alexander Bodon. It is located in a park in the neighbourhood Buitenveldert. The restaurant opened in 1989.

== See also ==
- List of Michelin starred restaurants in the Netherlands
