= Holmenkollen (disambiguation) =

Holmenkollen may refer to

- Holmenkollen, a neighborhood in Oslo
- Holmenkollen National Arena, a skiing and ski jumping venue
  - Holmenkollbakken, the ski jump
  - Holmenkollen Ski Festival
  - Holmenkollen Medal
- Holmenkollen Line of the Oslo Metro
  - Holmenkollen (station)
- Holmenkollen Chapel
- Holmenkollen Park Hotel Rica
- The Royal Lodge, Holmenkollen
