= La Bergère Group =

Dutch hospitality company

LBG Hotels
- Industry: Hospitality
- Founded: 2009
- Founder: Rino Soeters
- Headquarters: Maastricht, Netherlands
- Number of locations: 7 hotels
- Products: Hotels
- Website: LBG Hotels website

LBG Hotels is a Dutch hospitality company, formerly known as La Bergère Group, based in Maastricht, Netherlands. The group is active in the creation and exploitation of concepts for property development, hospitality and related projects.

== History ==
Hotel “La Bergère” opened its doors in 1990, led by Paul Rinkens, at the site of the former hotel “Steijns” in the Wyck district in Maastricht. This marked the opening of the first designhotel in the Benelux in Maastricht. "Designhotel La Bergère" grew and in 2004 "La Bergère Apartments" and "Hip Hotel St. Martenslane" were opened.

In that same year Rinkens handed the management of the hotel over to Rino Soeters. Designhotel La Bergère was sold to the Eden Hotel Group in 2007, the same year in which "Qbic Hotels" opened in the Amsterdam World Trade Center. The name La Bergère was retrieved in 2008 which led to the formation of the La Bergère Group in 2009.

"Townhouse Designhotel Maastricht" opened in late 2009. It gained attention after it had been awarded the Dutch Venuez Hospitality & Style Award for Best New Hotel Concept long before the opening of the hotel.

In June 2015 the company opened their 5th brand called "Kaboom hotel Maastricht".
