= Muscat Bay =

Resort near Qantab in Oman

Project
- Opening date: 2017
- Operator: Oman Tourism Development Company (Omran)
- Owner: Omran Company
- Website: www.muscatbay.com

Location
- Interactive map of Muscat Bay
- Location in Oman
- Coordinates: 23.5503°N 58.6382°E
- Country: Oman
- City: Muscat

Muscat Bay is a resort in Oman, located at Bandar Jissah near Qantab. Previously named Saraya Bandar Jissah, the project was rebranded as Muscat Bay in 2017. The resort is supported by the Omani government as part of an effort to expand the tourism industry in the country.

== History ==
Saraya Bandar Jissah was established in 2007, under private ownership. The project was rebranded to Muscat Bay in 2017.

== Projects ==
=== Properties ===
Muscat Bay spans across an area of 2.2 million square meters, with a high point of 250 metres. It consists of a mix of residential units including villas and apartments. Two 5-star Jumeirah Hotels are under development at Muscat Bay: Jumeirah Muscat Bay and a boutique luxury hotel.
