= Kaesong Folk Hotel =

Hotel in Kaesong, North Korea

Coordinates: 37°58′36″N 126°33′11″E

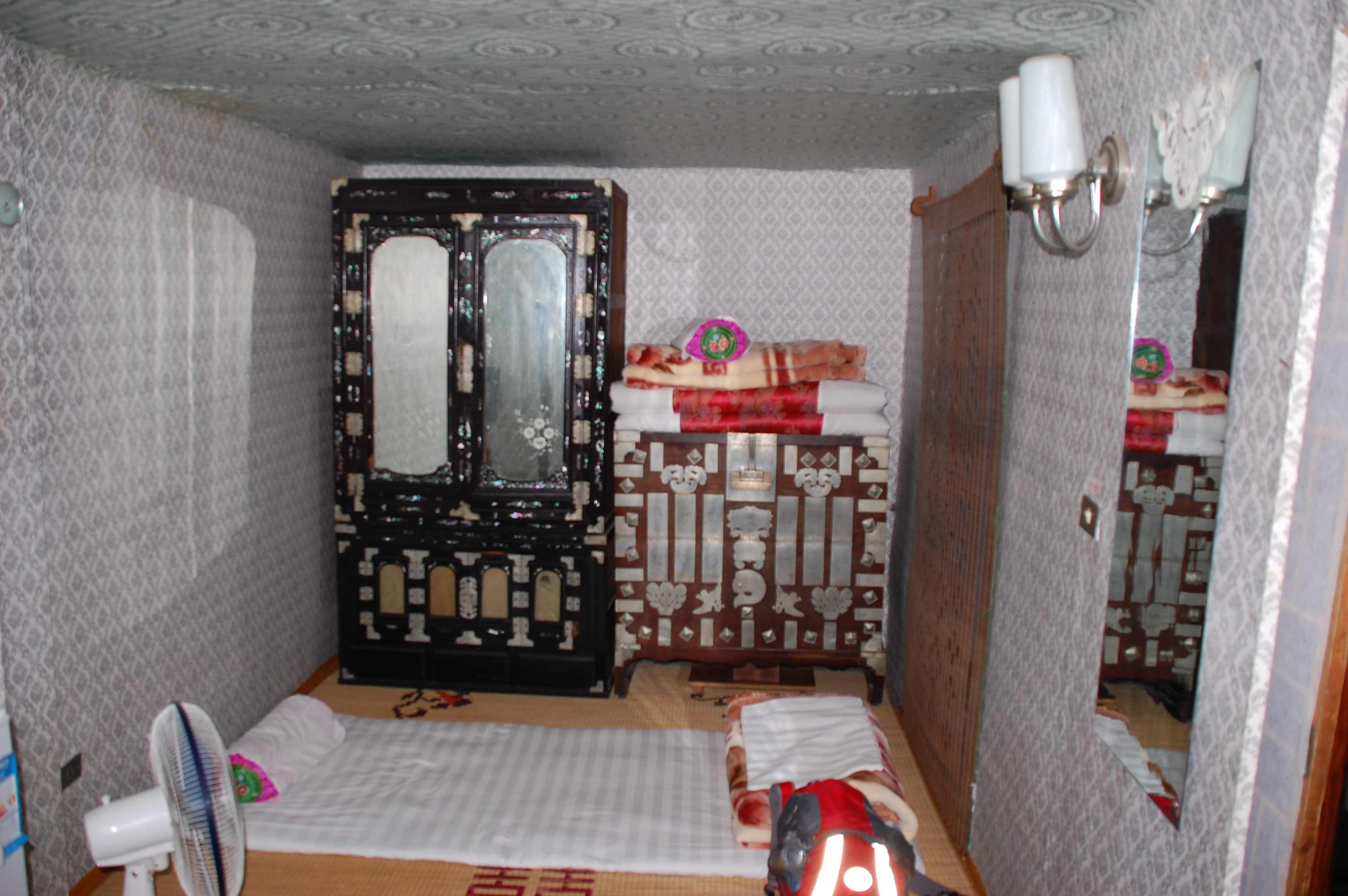
- A room inside the hotel

Korean name
- Hangul: 개성민속여관
- Hanja: 開城民俗旅館
- RR: Gaeseong minsok yeogwan
- MR: Kaesŏng minsok yŏgwan

The Kaesong Folk Hotel is a tourist hotel located in Kaesong, North Korea, which opened in 1989. Housed in 19 traditional hanok-style courtyard houses, many of which date to the Joseon dynasty and retain their original furnishings. The complex has 50 rooms, a traditional restaurant and a souvenir shop. The houses themselves are located on both sides of the stream that runs through Kaesong, with some located at the foot of Mountain Janam.

The hotel's accommodations are all traditionally Korean; guests sleep on the floor on padded mats, and all houses are equipped with the traditional Ondol heating system. Power outages are common at the hotel.

== History ==
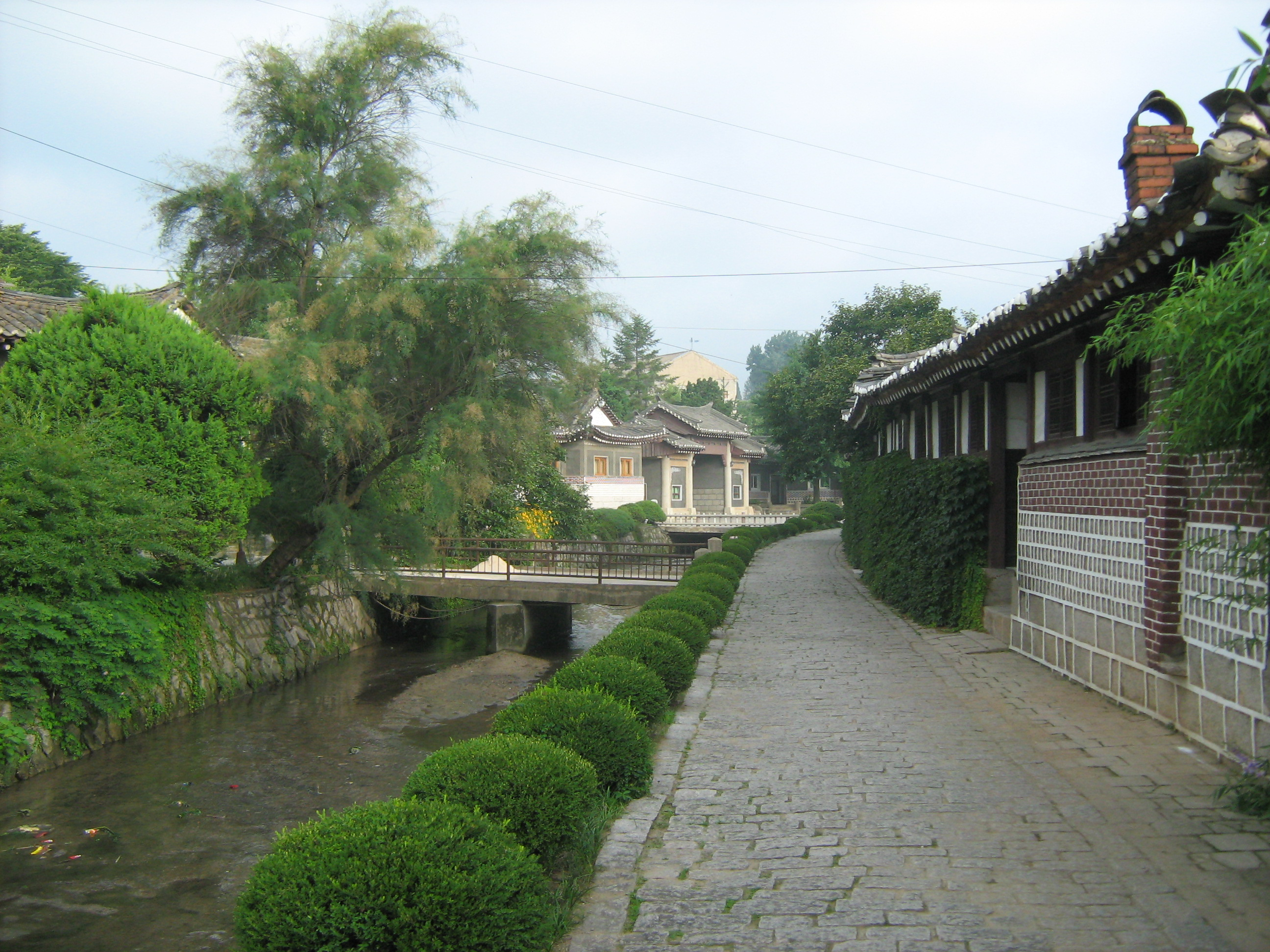
Inside the complex

The buildings were constructed at the time of the Ri Dynasty.

== See also ==
- List of hotels in North Korea
