= Townhouse Designhotel Maastricht =

Townhouse Hotel Maastricht & Spa
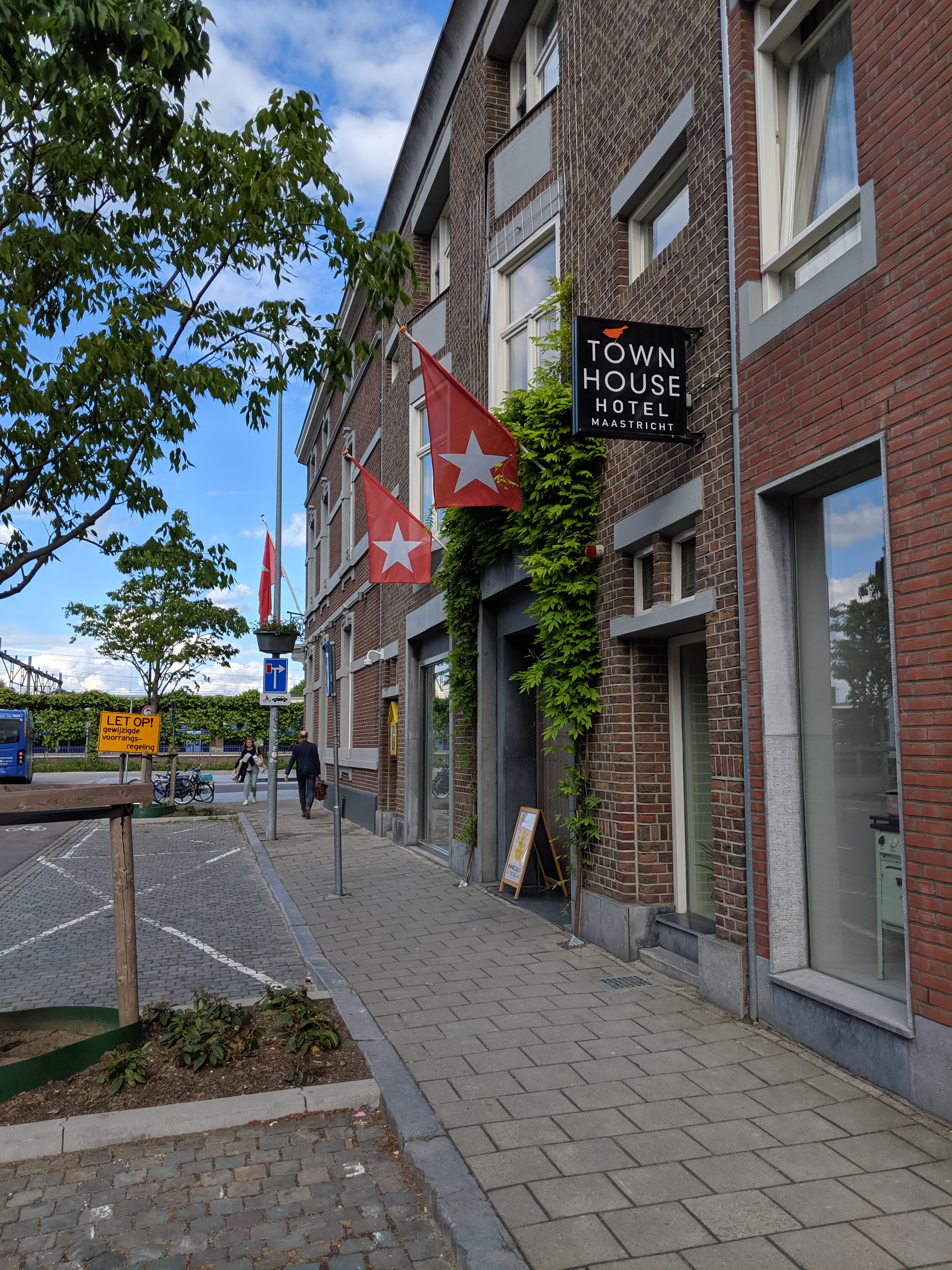
- Entrance to the Townhouse Hotel Maastricht & Spa, Limburg, Netherlands
- Interactive map of the Townhouse Hotel Maastricht & Spa area

General information
- Location: Maastricht, Netherlands, Sint Maartenslaan 5; 6221 AV Maastricht
- Coordinates: 50°51′05″N 5°42′13″E
- Opening: December 2009
- Operator: La Bergère Group

Technical details
- Floor count: 3

Other information
- Number of rooms: 69
- Parking: Yes

Website
- http://www.townhousehotels.nl/

Townhouse Hotel Maastricht & Spa is a four-star design hotel located in the Wyck district in Maastricht, Netherlands. The hotel opened in late 2009. Townhouse is part of the La Bergère Group.

== Concept ==
The launch campaign of Townhouse, which started in February 2009, was called ‘Stijl, Sex en Soep’ (Style, Sex and Soup). The ingredients in this campaign stood for: Style (design, architecture and art), Sex (the passion in daily life) and Soup (cuisine, authenticity and genuine.

The elements of the launch campaign return in the concept of Townhouse by creating an atmosphere of a Maastricht living room. Elements from Maastricht are used in the entire hotel (including sanitary and tiles from Maastricht companies Mosa Tegels and Sphinx). This is complemented by design furniture including brands as Hästens and Artifort.

The concept was awarded the Best New Hotel Concept Award at the Venuez Hospitality & Style Award 2009 before the hotel was even opened.

== History ==
Townhouse Hotel is opened at the site of former hotel Le Roi in the Wyck district in Maastricht, one of the oldest districts in the center of Maastricht.

Townhouse Hotel is sponsor for Maastricht football club MVV during the season 2010-11. "Qbic Hotels", a part of La Bergère Group, is also sponsor for MVV.

== Planet Care ==
As from 2016, Townhouse Hotel is Planet Care certified.

Before the hotel was awarded the Green Key Award on 24 August 2010. The Green Key Award is awarded to companies in the tourism and recreation industry who contribute to the prevention of climate change and voluntary take measures to do more about the environment than legislation orders them. Townhouse Hotel was awarded the Gold Award, the highest level of Green Key, until it switched to Planet Care.
