= Niue Hotel =

Demolished hotel in Niue, Oceania

Niue Hotel was a hotel in Niue, Oceania, the largest on the island. The government-owned hotel was built in 1975 in the hope of stimulating tourism. It was badly damaged in 1990, but was refurbished and expanded. However, it struggled to attract guests and in 2000 was put up for sale and leased for use as a medical school. The buildings were destroyed by a hurricane in 2004.

== Opening ==
The Niue Hotel was built in 1975 (Note: Another source says the hotel opened in 1974.) on the coast between Alofi and the airport. The hotel was state-owned. and there were originally 20 rooms and 40 beds. Built in the hope of stimulating tourism rather than in response to demand, its immediate purpose was to provide accommodations for attendees of the 1978 South Pacific Forum meeting.

In 1975 the International Labour Organization provided fellowships in hotel and tourism training in Tonga to three candidates from Niue, in kitchen, housekeeping and front office. On their return to Niue they worked at the Niue Hotel.

== Operations ==
The hotel was managed by the Tourist Board. The Niue Hotel provided superior accommodation to that available elsewhere in the region. The restaurant and bar were housed in a round building in the center of the complex, and the bar looked out over the Pacific. From June to August 1979 the hotel had 289 guests, of whom 113 were tourists, more than half from New Zealand. In the 1980s the premier Sir Robert Rex was a frequent visitor.

In 1990 the hotel was badly damaged by Cyclone Ofa. It was repaired and expanded. Reconstruction cost NZ$1.5 million, mainly provided by the government of New Zealand. The hotel was reopened at the end of May 1990. The two-story hotel now had 32 rooms. With the additional 12 rooms there was now enough accommodation to support a regular air service from Auckland to Niue. The decision to lease it to New Zealand interests caused a rebellion by cabinet ministers that almost caused premier Sir Robert Rex to be forced out of office.

In the early 1990s the Niue Hotel was the social hub of residents of the island, as well as accommodating visitors. A 2000 travel guide gave rates of NZ$109/125 for single or double occupancy of a room, including breakfast. Rooms were cooled by fan, and had a fridge and private bath. There was also an ocean-view executive suite and a family suite that could accommodate six. The hotel had a restaurant with 100 seats, a bar, gift shop and swimming pool.

== Closure ==
The Niue tourism business continued to struggle. When the 24-room Matavai Resort opened in September 1996 there were just six tourists on Niue, and the Niue Hotel had no guests at all. In 2000 Premier Sani Lakatani announced that the government would put the hotel up for sale. It had been experiencing poor occupancy rates compared to the better quality Matavai Resort, which itself was finding it hard to attract visitors. In 2000 the Lord Liverpool University George Washington School of Medicine was founded on the island, with the former hotel as its campus. The hotel was destroyed by Cyclone Heta in January 2004.
