= Beetsterzwaag =

Village in Friesland, Netherlands

Beetsterzwaag Beetstersweach
- Village
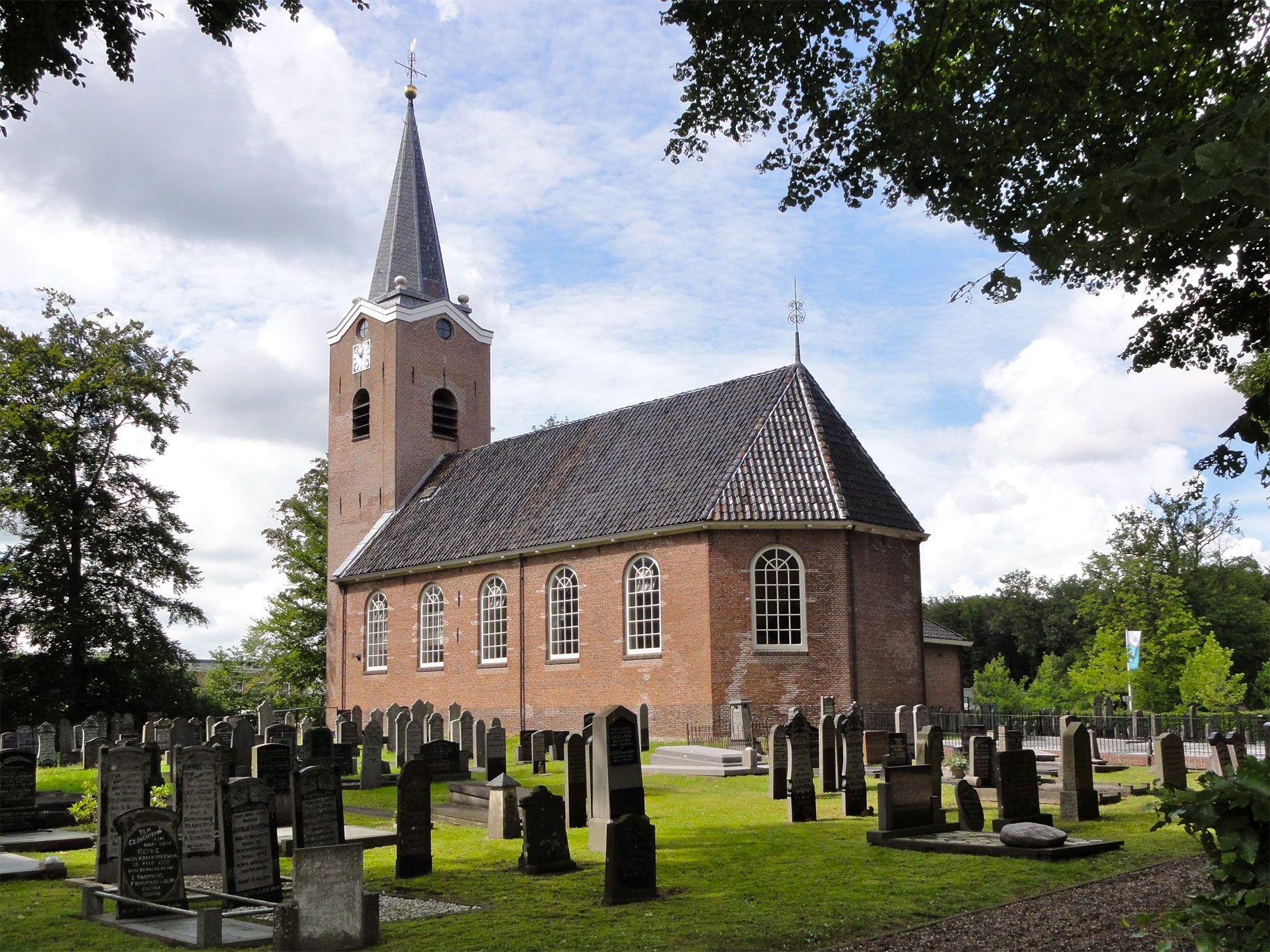
- Beetsterzwaag church

- Flag Coat of arms

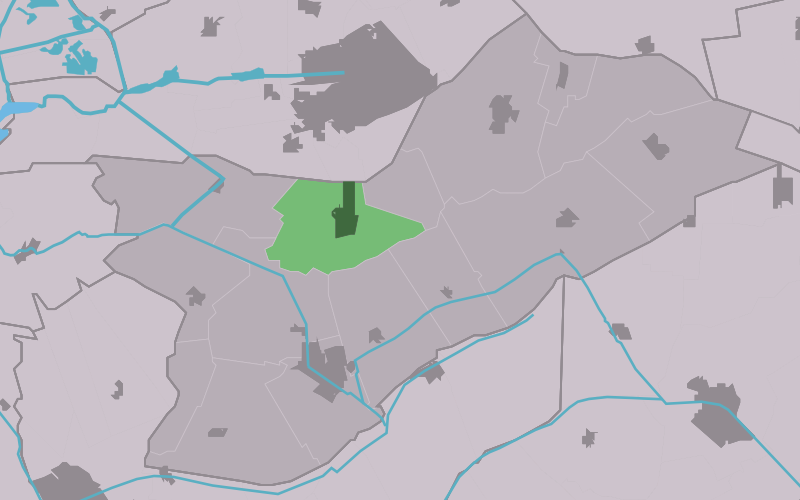
- Location in Opsterland municipality

- Location in the Netherlands Beetsterzwaag (Netherlands)
- Coordinates: 53°03′40″N 6°4′39″E
- Country: Netherlands
- Province: Friesland
- Municipality: Opsterland

Area
  - Total: 20.99 km^{2} (8.10 sq mi)
- Elevation: 0.9 m (3.0 ft)

Population (2021)
  - Total: 3,685
  - Density: 175.6/km^{2} (454.7/sq mi)
- Time zone: UTC+1 (CET)
  - Summer (DST): UTC+2 (CEST)
- Postal code: 9244
- Dialing code: 0512

Beetsterzwaag (West Frisian: Beetstersweach) is a village in the municipality of Opsterland in the east of Friesland in the Netherlands. It had a population of around 3,485 in January 2017. Beetsterzwaag is known for its estates and manor houses.

== History ==
The village was first mentioned in 1315 as Suagh, and means "pasture with cattle belonging to Oud Beets". Beetsterzwaag developed on a sandy ridge from Oud Beets. In 1684, the village already contained four manor houses, and in the 19th century was described as "a kilometre of noble houses surrounded by parks and forests".

The Dutch Reformed church was built between 1803 and 1804 and was enlarged in the 20th century. Harinxma State was built in 1841 by grietman (mayor) van Harinxma thoe Slooten. It has a large park dating from 1845. It was modernised and extended in 1931.

Lauswolt was bought in 1826 and turned into a manor house in 1868. It was enlarged many times, and in 1954 was transformed into a five-star hotel. The restaurant had a Michelin Star between 2001 and 2006, and regained its star in 2020.

Beetsterzwaag was home to 748 in 1840.

== Notable people ==
Its most famous inhabitant was the Dutch actor Rutger Hauer, who died at his home in the village on 19 July 2019. The Dutch poet J. Slauerhoff lived there, who in May–July 1929 ran the practice of the local doctor, a temporary profession eternalized in a poem by J.C. Bloem printed in the national paper Het Vaderland. Beetsterzwaag is also the birthplace of Hilbert van der Duim, a speed skater active in the 1980s; Van der Duim was twice all-around World Champion, twice all-around European champion, and seven times Dutch champion. Maxime Oosten was also born in Beetsterzwaag.

== Gallery ==
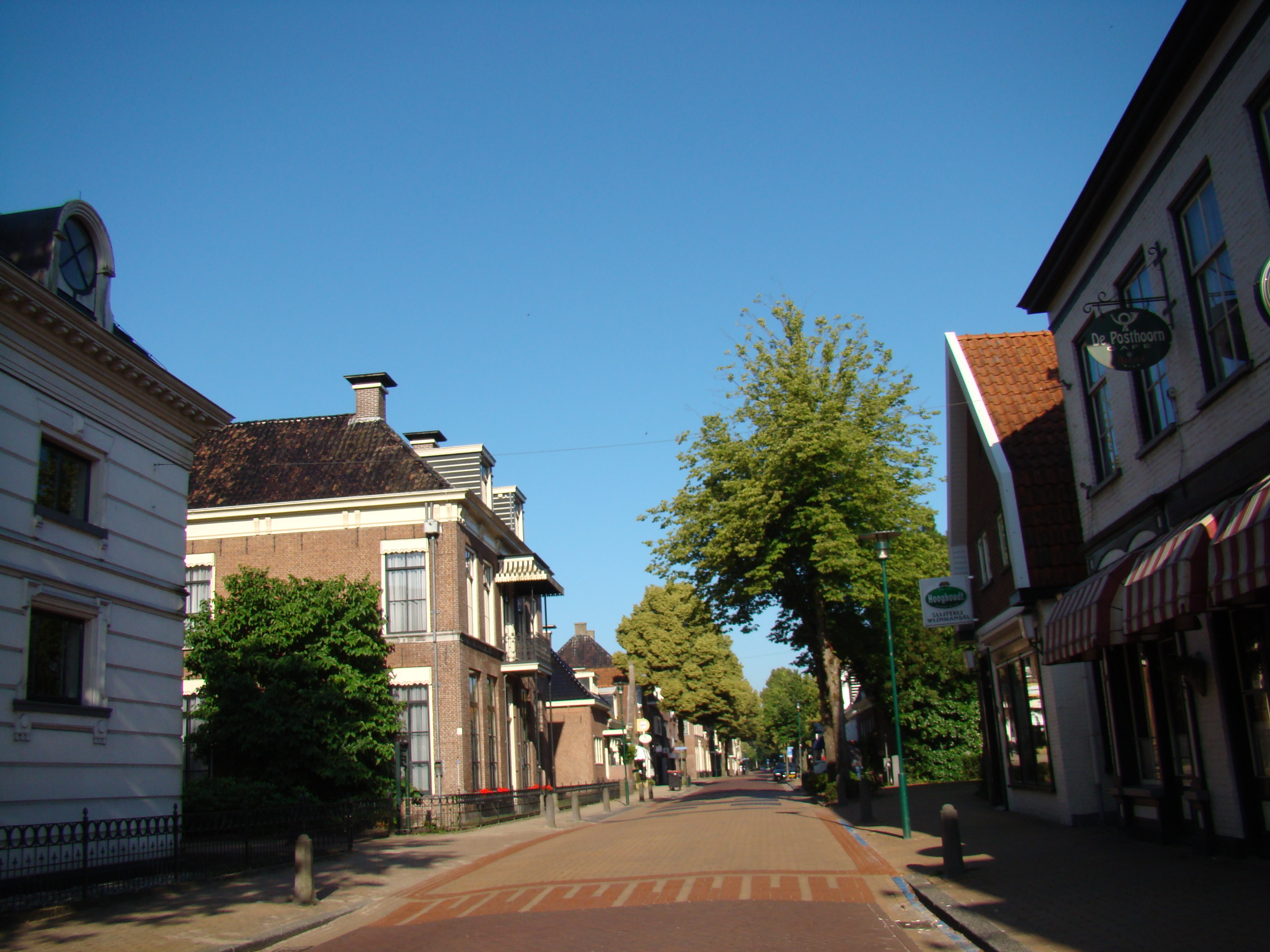
Street view

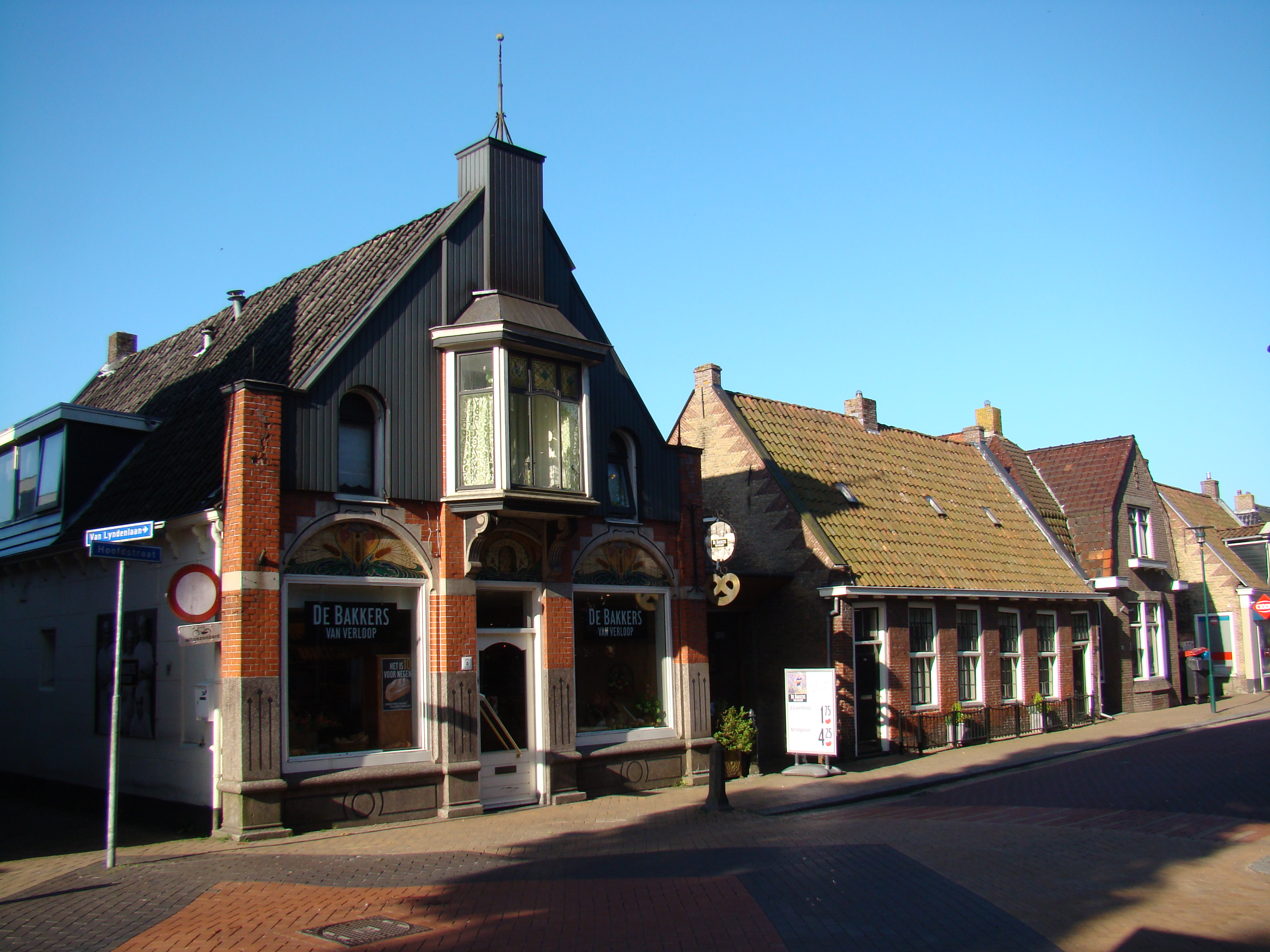
Bakery in Beetsterzwaag

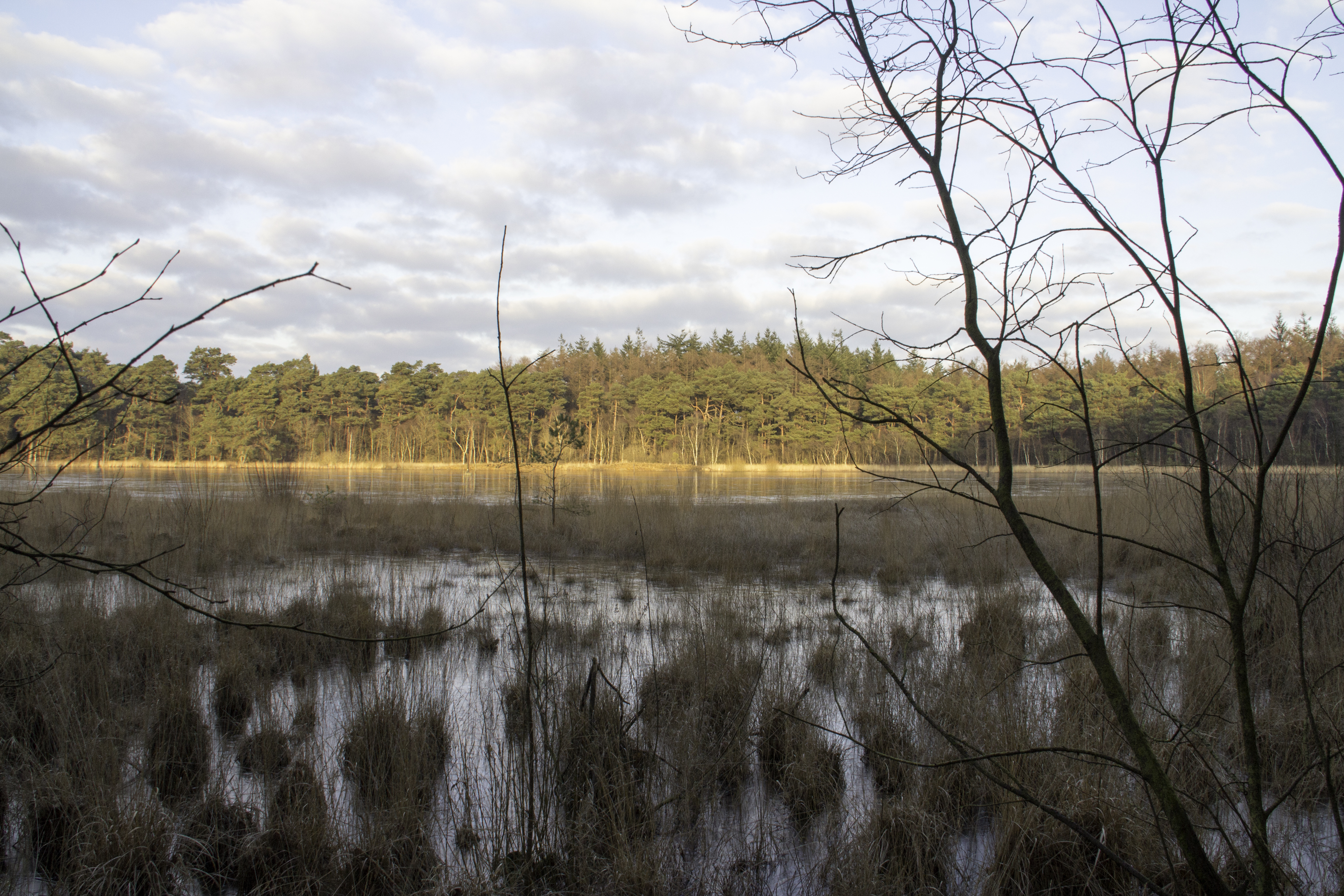
Nature near Beetsterzwaag

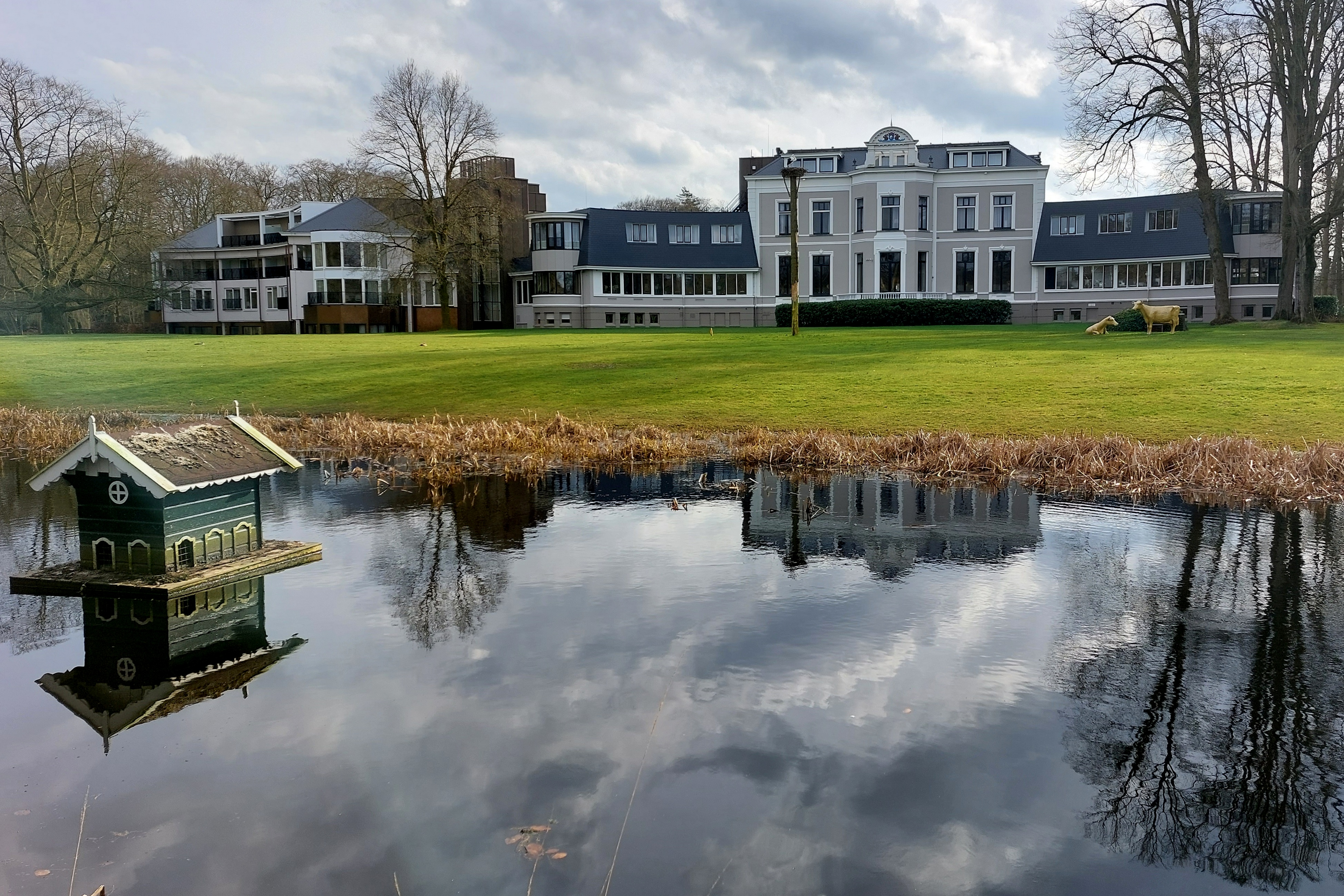
Hotel Lauswolt
