= De L'Europe Amsterdam =

Luxury hotel

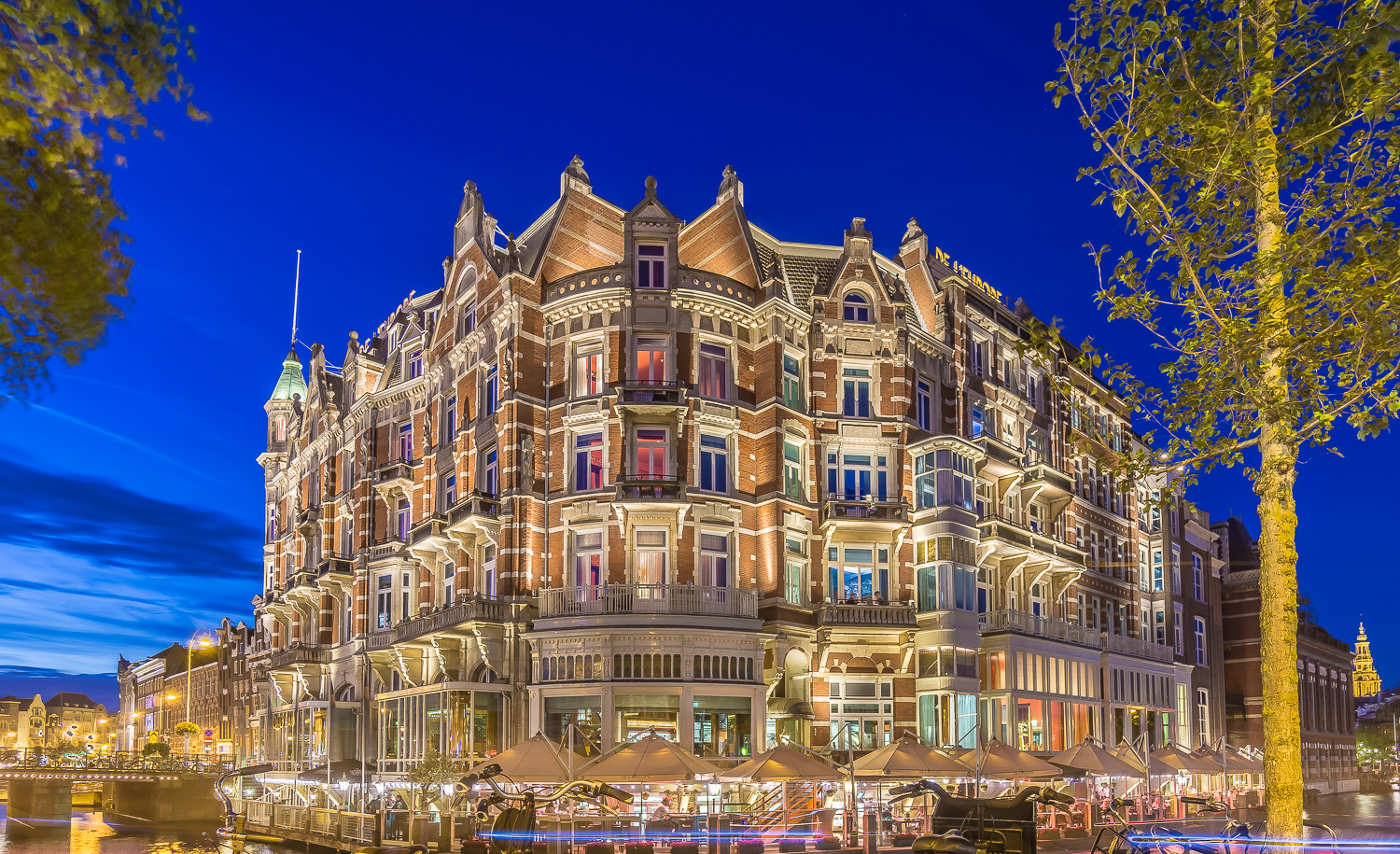
- De L'Europe Amsterdam seen from the Amstel

- Location within Amsterdam

General information
- Architectural style: Neo-renaissance
- Location: Nieuwe Doelenstraat 2-14, Amsterdam, Netherlands
- Coordinates: 52°22′3″N 4°53′40″E
- Opening: 23 September 1896
- Owner: Beerbrewer Heineken

Technical details
- Floor count: 5

Design and construction
- Architect: Willem Hamer jr.

Other information
- Number of rooms: 107
- Number of suites: 55
- Number of restaurants: 3
- Number of bars: 1
- Facilities: Wellness center, gym, five elegant and unique event spaces
- Parking: Yes

Website
- www.deleurope.com

De L'Europe Amsterdam (formerly known as Hotel de l'Europe) is a five-star hotel located on the Amstel river in the centre of Amsterdam, Netherlands. De L'Europe Amsterdam is situated opposite and overlooking the Munt, where the river Amstel flows into the Rokin canal. The 19th-century hotel became an official monument (rijksmonument) in 2001. Since 2012 the hotel houses the Michelin-starred restaurant Bord'Eau Restaurant Gastronomique. It is a member of The Leading Hotels of the World.

Freddy's Bar, the bar of the hotel, is named after Freddy Heineken.

De L'Europe Amsterdam changed its name in 2011, after being called Hotel de L'Europe since 1896.

== History ==
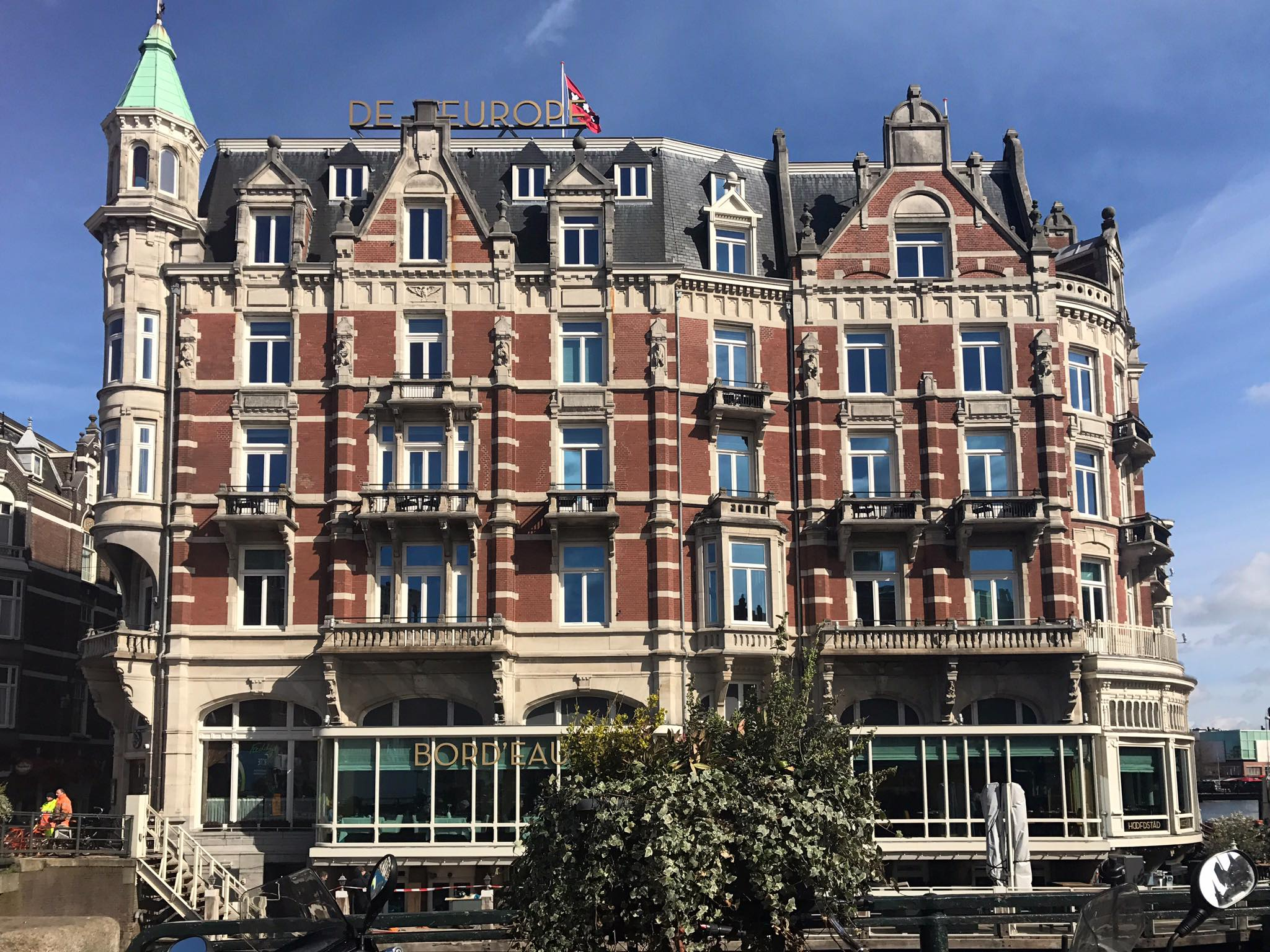
The hotel from the Muntplein

A tower at the present-day location of Hotel de l'Europe was demolished in 1633 and five year later the inn, later hotel, Het Rondeel, was built. This building was replaced in 1895–1896, when the 50-room Hotel de l'Europe, designed by architect Willem Hamer Jr., opened its doors.

Alfred Hitchcock used the hotel just before the Second World War as a location for Foreign Correspondent (1940).
