= Tourism in Nauru =

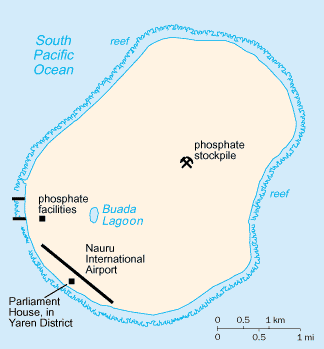
Map of Nauru

Nauru is a small, isolated western Pacific island, which lacks many of the tourist facilities of some of its larger neighbours, such as Fiji, the Cook Islands, or even New Caledonia. Tourism does not make a significant contribution to the economy. According to the Australian Outbound Travel report published by the Pacific Islands Trade and Investment Commission in 2008, a total of 478 Australian inbound tourists visited the island, 117 for vacation, 140 for business, and 221 for other reasons.

== Getting to Nauru ==
Nauru International Airport is the sole airport on the island. Nauru Airlines, formerly known as Air Nauru and Our Airline, is the only passenger airline operating to the island. It operates four passenger (and one cargo) Boeing 737-300 aircraft out of Brisbane, Australia, and provides an air link to Nadi, Tarawa, Majuro, Pohnpei, Palau and Brisbane.

== Accommodation ==
There are four accommodations in Nauru, namely the Menen Hotel (the largest hotel on the island), the OD-N-Aiwo Hotel, Ewa Lodge and Goodworks accommodation (serviced apartments). The Menen hosts one restaurant and one bar. The hotel offers views of Anibare bay, off the east coast of the island.

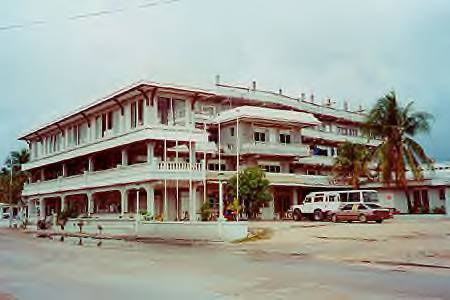
The OD-N-Aiwo Hotel in Aiwo

The OD-N-Aiwo Hotel is located in Aiwo district. While smaller than the Menen Hotel, it is the tallest building in Nauru. The hotel is a three-story complex with nearby facilities including a supermarket, coffee shop, Naoero Postal Corporation, Nauru Tourism Corporation, an Australian Bendigo Bank branch and an ATM. The available room types are single standard small, single standard large and twin standard large rooms and are equipped with basic amenities.

The Ewa Lodge accommodation is made up of modern serviced apartments. It is located only one minute away from the Ewa beach and has various facilities such as a bakery, coffee shop, supermarket, bottle shop to purchase liquor, an Australian Bendigo Bank branch and an ATM within the premises.

The Goodworks accommodation is made up of serviced apartments, available as 3-bedroom and 1-bedroom apartments. It is located in Aiwo District and is about 7 to 10 minutes away from the airport by car.

There are various restaurants which offer Oriental, Western and Pacific style cuisine, laundromats, car rental agencies, and accommodations airport shuttle service to Nauru International Airport.

== Leisure activities ==
The region is covered by the sandy coastline and coconut trees. Deep sea game fishing is offered by several local businesses, with privately owned boats available for charter. Scuba diving equipment is available on Nauru; the surrounding waters provide various wreck diving opportunities.

== See also ==
- Visa policy of Nauru
- Economy of Nauru
