= Apollo Hotel Amsterdam =

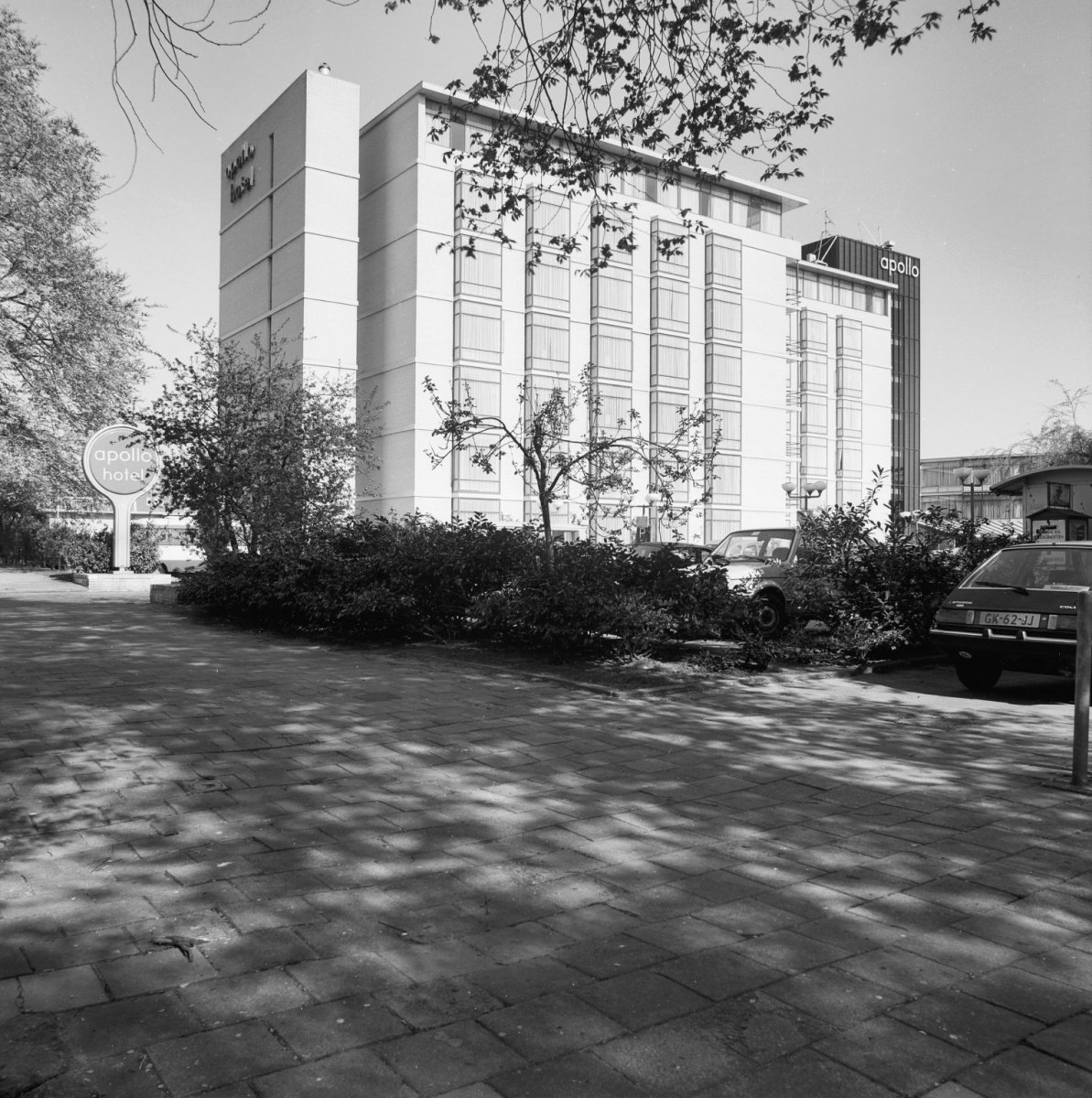
- Apollo Hotel, 1981
- Interactive map of the Apollo Hotel Amsterdam area

General information
- Location: Apollolaan 2; Amsterdam, 1077 BA; Netherlands
- Coordinates: 52°20′54″N 4°53′6″E
- Operator: Marriott International

The Apollo Hotel Amsterdam is a four-star hotel on the Stadionweg and Apollolaan in the Apollolaan District of Amsterdam-Zuid, Netherlands. The hotel has 223 rooms and a restaurant, La Sirène. Located on the North Amstel Canal, it has a private marina near the confluence of five canals. Museumplein, the Hilton Amsterdam and Marie Heinekenplein are nearby.

== History ==
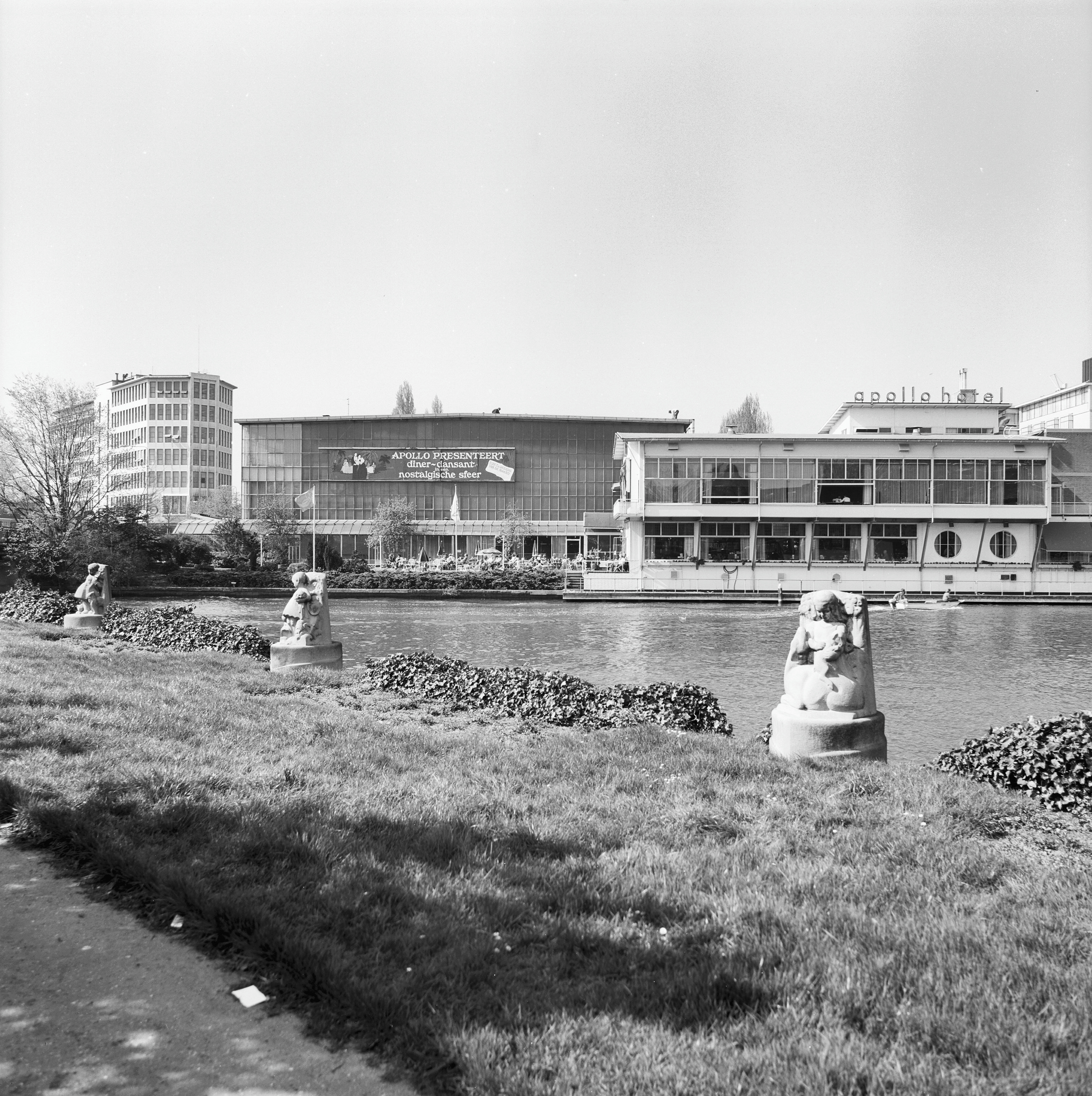
Apollo Hotel, 1981

The Apollo Hotel originates from the bar and restaurant Apollo Pavilion at Apollolaan and the South Amstel Canal, opened in 1934. Both the pavilion and the sports complex next door, the Apollohal, were designed by Albert Boeken. Both are classified as a Rijksmonument, no. 527829.

In 1962 the pavilion was expanded to become the 65-room Apollo Hotel, following a design of architect Alexander Bodon. His associate, Jan Henrik Ploeger, was responsible for two later expansions, in 1969 and 1974.

In 1995, the Apollo Hotel joined the Le Méridien Group, and shared the group's logo at the time.

Since 2006 the hotel has been part of Apollo Hotels & Resorts, a subsidiary of European Hotel Management. From 2006 to 2009, the Apollo Hotel was part of a franchise formula, the Golden Tulip brand, and since January 2010 it has belonged to Wyndham Hotels.

== Features ==
A 1973 gourmet guide stated that the hotel restaurant had a "first class French menu and a wine list to match". The hotel's 1985 Leisure Center was designed by the architect Cees Dam. The Apollo Pavilion was updated to form the tangerine-hued seafood restaurant, La Sirène, with a wide range of shellfish. The hotel is also served by The Marina Lounge overlooking the canal, which serves cocktails. Room service is offered at the hotel for 12 hours a day, from 11 am to 11pm. The Churchill Smokers Lounge, furnished with Chesterfield chairs, caters for smokers.
