= Alexander Bodon =

Dutch architect

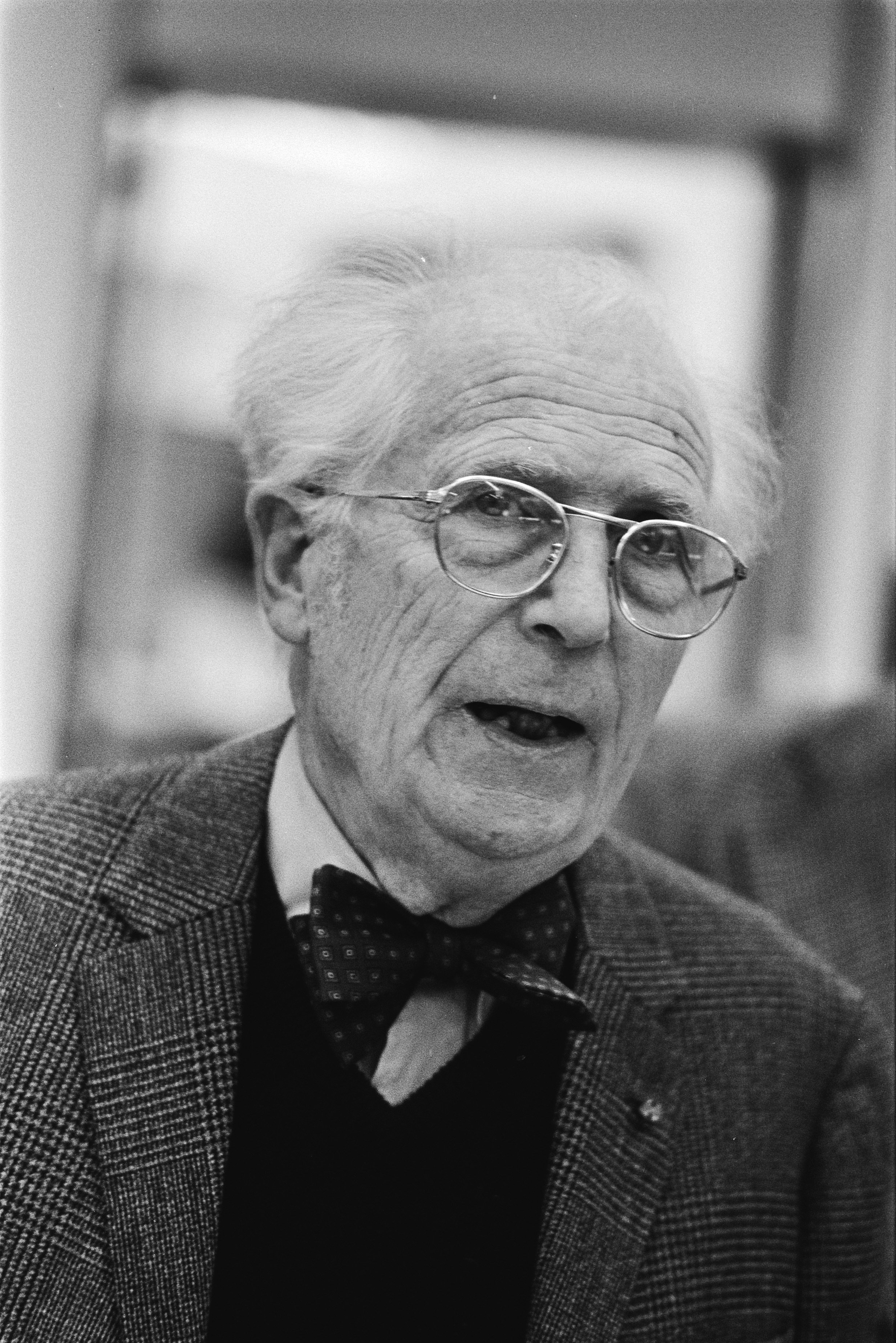
Alexander Bodon in 1983

Alexander Bodon (Vienna, 6 September 1906 – Amsterdam, 22 January 1993) was a Dutch architect.

Bodon's father, K. Bodon, was a Hungarian interior architect. As a young man Alexander was first taught the trade of building furniture, and in 1924 began studying in Budapest. He moved to the Netherlands in 1929 to continue his studies, working with, among others, the architect Jan Wils. He later worked for architects Jan Buijs and Lürsen, and for the agencies of Ben Merkelbach and Charles Karsten.

He received his first assignment in 1932, for the Schroder en Dupont bookstore on the Keizersgracht in Amsterdam. Bodon had a studio in Amsterdam in 1934, together with Eva Besnyö and Carel Blazer, and was a member of the group De 8. From 1935 to 1940 he led the short-lived Nieuwe Kunstschool (1934-1941), a school for the arts whose students included Otto Treumann, Benno Premsela, and Violette Cornelius. Bodon taught at the school, and later served as its director.

He was established as an independent architect by 1945, and after 1954 was a partner in the architectural and engineering firm J.P. van Bruggen, G. Drexhage, J.J. Sterkenburg en Alexander Bodon. He is best known as the architect of the Amsterdam RAI (1951). Other notable works include the Apollo Hotel in Amsterdam (1961).

== Bibliography ==
- Maarten Kloos, Alexander Bodon, architect. Rotterdam, 010, 1990. ISBN 90-6450-087-8.
