= Aitutaki Lagoon Private Island Resort =

Resort in the Cook Islands

Coordinates: 18.8500°S 159.7570°W

- Interactive map of the Aitutaki Lagoon Private Island Resort area
- Former names: Aitutaki Lagoon Resort & Spa

General information
- Location: Akitua, Aitutaki, Cook Islands
- Owner: Tata Crocombe

Design and construction
- Developer: Tamatoa Ariki

Other information
- Number of rooms: 36 bungalows
- Facilities: Restaurant, bar, spa, gym

Website
- www.aitutakilagoonresort.com

The Aitutaki Lagoon Private Island Resort, called the Aitutaki Lagoon Resort & Spa until March 2018, is a resort on the islet of Akitua in Aitutaki, in the Cook Islands. The resort has a 45-year lease on the islet, and consists of 36 bungalows, a restaurant, a bar, spa, gym, and associated facilities. The resort was used as the location for Air New Zealand's Safety in Paradise video and the Sports Illustrated 50th anniversary swimsuit edition.

The resort was originally developed by Tamatoa Ariki. It was purchased by businessman Tata Crocombe in 2003.

Catriona Rowntree, the presenter for Australian Nine Network's travel show Getaway, has called the resort her favourite destination.

In February 2005, the resort was evacuated in preparation for Cyclone Meena.

The resort was offered for sale in 2014, but found no buyers. In March 2018 it was renamed the Aitutaki Lagoon Private Island Resort.

The resort was for sale on Trade Me from March 2018 for NZ$32 million. A major fire in July 2018 destroyed the kitchen, bar, and three bungalows. The resort was forced to close in early 2020 due to the COVID-19 pandemic.

In May 2020 the resort's restaurant, bar, and kitchen were completely destroyed by fire.
