= Lauswolt =

Coordinates: 53°03′28″N 6°05′27″E

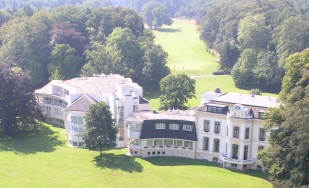
Lauswolt in Beetsterzwaag

Lauswolt is an estate in Beetsterzwaag, Friesland, the Netherlands, dating back to the 17th century. The estate is currently being used as a hotel. The restaurant, called De Heeren van Harinxma, had a Michelin star between 2001 and 2006 and has one as of 2022.

Lauswolt was the location of talks between CDA, the Labour Party and ChristianUnion for the formation of a new government. The negotiations were intended to be secret, but De Telegraaf newspaper revealed Lauswolt as the location on the very first day of the talks.
