= Scandic Holmenkollen Park Hotel =

Coordinates: 59.9628°N 10.6632°E

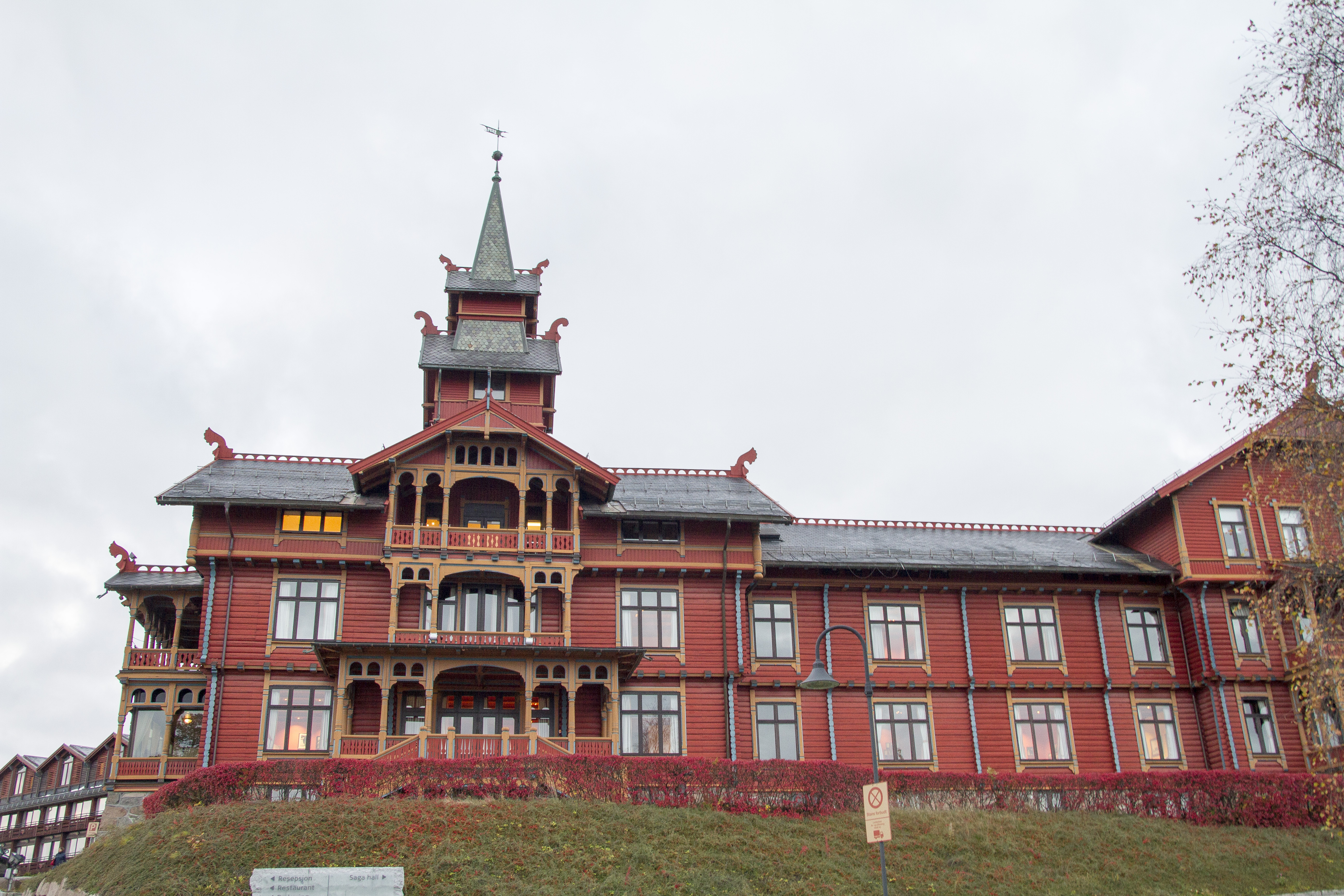

General information
- Opened: 1894; 131 years ago

Website
- www.scandichotels.com/hotels/norway/oslo/scandic-holmenkollen-park

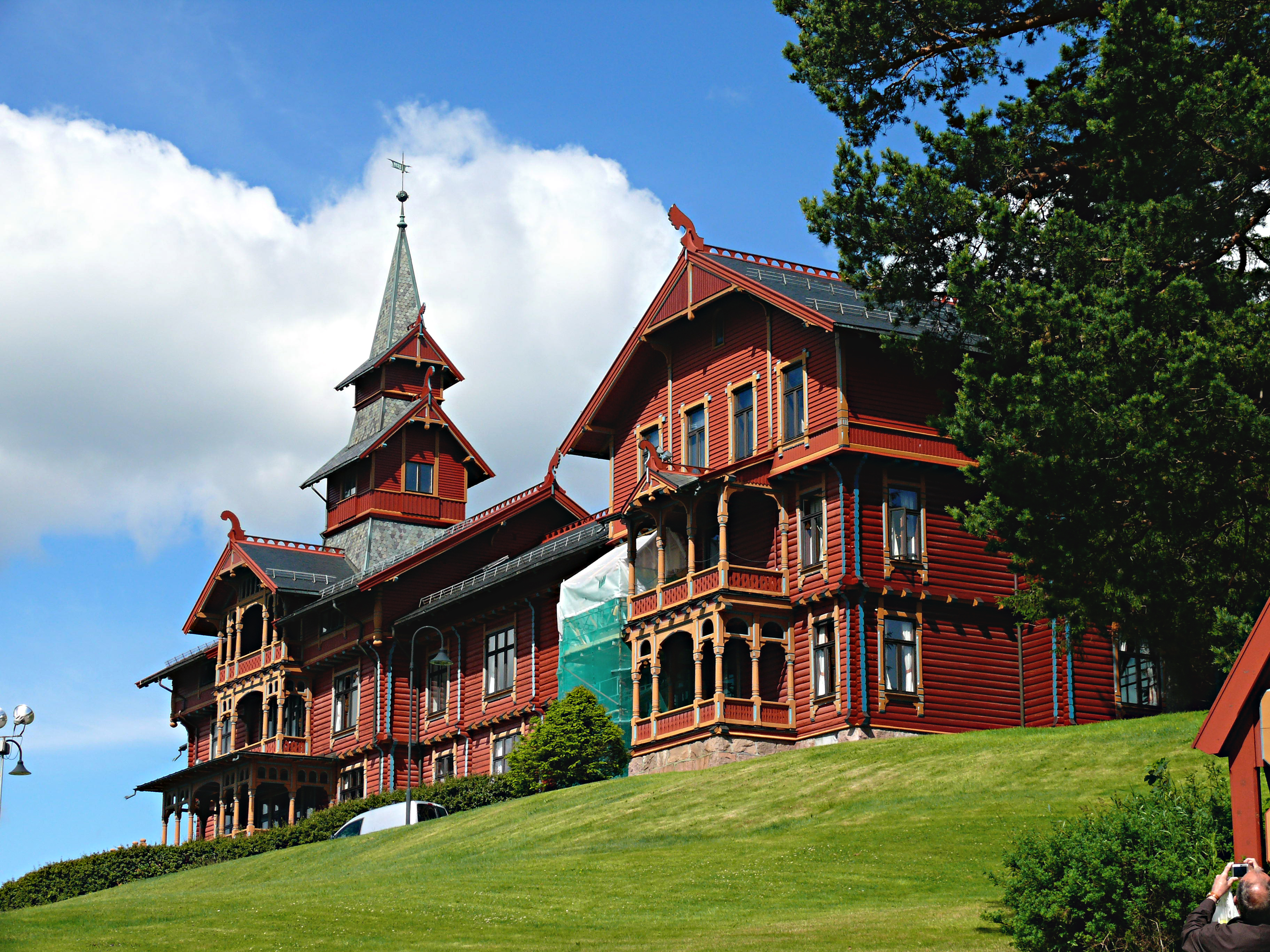
Scandic Holmenkollen Park Hotel

Scandic Holmenkollen Park Hotel is a seminar and conference hotel in Holmenkollen in Oslo, Norway, close to Holmenkollen National Arena and Holmenkollbakken, and the Holmenkollen station of the Oslo Metro. Opened in 1894, it was designed by Balthazar Lange and is regarded as one of the prime examples of the Dragestil style of design and architecture in Norway.

The interior decorations include paintings by Gerhard Munthe and Theodor Kittelsen.

The hotel and its restaurant, De Fem Stuer, are notable for the views of the fjords.

== History ==
The building was completed in 1894 and was designed by Balthazar Lange in dragestil. It was originally built as a sanatorium for the treatment of tuberculosis patients by Ingebrigt Christian Holm (1844–1918).

After Holmenkollen Turisthotell burned down in 1914, the sanatorium use converted into use as a hotel. During World War II, the hotel was in possession of German officials. The hotel was modernized in 1948, and again in 1982 for FIS Nordic World Ski Championships 1982. The latest renovation was completed in 1991, when the hotel was expanded with a conference center designed by Hans-Gabriel Finne.
