= Americus (given name) =

Unisex given name

- Gender: Unisex
- Language: English via German, Italian, and Latin

Origin
- Meaning: "Home ruler”

Other names
- Related names: Masculine: Amalric, Amaury, Amerigo, Amory, Emmerich, Emery, Enrico, Enrique, Harry, Heikki, Heinrich, Hendrik, Henri, Henrik, Henry, Imre Feminine: America, Americana, Ameriga, Amerique, Enriqueta, Harriet, Henrietta, Henriette

Americus is a unisex given name, a Latin version of the Italian name Amerigo that is ultimately derived from the medieval German name Amalric, meaning "home ruler." Americus is etymologically related to the names Amaury, Emery, Emmerich, and Henry and their variants. The Americas were named in honor of Italian explorer and navigator Amerigo Vespucci, giving the name Americus a strong association with the United States of America.

Americus is traditionally a masculine name but has also been in occasional use for girls in the United States since the 18th century along with variants America, Americana, Ameriga, and Amerique. Americus is a place name used for several American towns, including Americus, Georgia, Americus, Kansas, Americus, Indiana, and Americus, Missouri. In some instances, girls might have been named for one of these towns. The heavily symbolic name was used for Americus Nation, a female child character in the 1995 novel Where the Heart Is by American novelist Billie Letts and the 2000 movie based on the novel.

== Males ==
- Americus Backers (died 1778), Dutch instrument maker
- Mark Americus Costantino (1920–1990), American judge
- Americus Mayo (died 1891), American politician
- Americus V. Rice (1835–1904), American politician, banker, and businessman
- Americus Symmes (1811–1896), son of American Army officer, trader, and lecturer John Cleves Symmes Jr.

== Females ==
- Industry Americus Collins (born 2024), daughter of American pronatalists Simone and Malcolm Collins

== Fictional characters ==
- Americus Nation, a character in the 1995 novel Where the Heart Is by American novelist Billie Letts and the 2000 movie based on the novel

== See also ==
- Americus (horse), American racehorse
