= Hembree =

Origin
- Language: Germanic
- Meaning: either ermen "whole, universal", amal "work, labour" or haim "home" + ric "power", "ruler"
- Region of origin: United States (altered spelling of a European surname)

Other names
- Cognates: Hembrey, Hembry, Amery, Emery, Emmerich, Emerich, Amalric, Amaury, Amerigo, Arrigo, Haimirich, Heinrich

Hembree is an English surname almost exclusively found in the (southeastern) United States, where it represents an altered spelling of the English family name Hembr(e)y, which may be traced to one of at least three Germanic compound personal names (Emery, Amalric or Henry). Notable people with this name include:

- Absalom J. Hembree (1813–1856), American soldier and politician
- Bill Hembree (1966–2026), American politician
- Heath Hembree (born 1989), American baseball player
- Jared Hembree, American politician
