= Emich =

Emich is a masculine given name of Germanic origin. It is a reduced form of Emmerich. Similar names include Emrich, Emch, Emig, Amick, Emick.

Notable people with the name include:

- Emich I of Worms (died 1299), also bishop of Worms
- Emich I of Nassau-Hadamar (died 1334)
- Emich II of Nassau-Hadamar (died 1359)
- Emich III of Nassau-Hadamar (died 1394)
- Emich IV, Count of Leiningen-Dagsburg (died 1281)
- Emich IX, Count of Leiningen-Dagsburg (died 1535)
- Emich Christian of Leiningen-Dagsburg (1642–1702), Count of Leiningen and Dagsburg and Lord of Broich, Oberstein and Bürgel
- Emich Carl, 2nd Prince of Leiningen (1763–1814)
- Emich, Prince of Leiningen (1866–1939)
- Emich Kyrill, Prince of Leiningen (1926–1991)

== See also ==
- Emicho
- Emichones, early medieval noble family in which the name was common
