= Emre =

- Pronunciation: [ˈemɾe]
- Gender: Male
- Language: Turkish

Origin
- Origin: Proto-Turkic
- Derivation: imrenmek
- Meaning: Lover, friend
- Region of origin: Turkey

Other names
- Variant forms: Emrecan, Emrehan

Emre is a popular Turkish male given name that means "lover" and/or "friend". It is also a surname in Turkey.

The most popular idea is that Emre originates from the Turkish imrenmek, meaning “to love, desire" or "to feel a longing".

Emre is also associated with the Persian همراه (hamrâh), meaning "companion" or "fellow", although this may correlate more with the name Emrah.

In Turkey, Emre is the 16th most common name among the male population.

Notable people with the given name include:

- Emre Akbaba (born 1992), Turkish footballer
- Emre Altuğ (born 1970), Turkish musician
- Emre Aracı (born 1968), Turkish music historian, conductor, composer
- Emre Aydın (born 1981), Turkish rock singer
- Emre Aşık (born 1973), Turkish footballer
- Emre Zafer Barnes (born 1988), Jamaican-Turkish sprinter
- Emre Bayav (born 1987), Turkish basketball player
- Emre Belözoğlu (born 1980), Turkish footballer and coach
- Emre Can (born 1994), German-Turkish footballer
- Emre Can (chess player) (born 1990), Turkish Grandmaster chess player
- Emre Çolak (born 1991), Turkish footballer
- Emre Elivar (born 1976), Turkish concert pianist
- Emre Gönensay (born 1937), Turkish politician
- Emre Güngör (born 1984), Turkish footballer
- Emre Güral (born 1989), Turkish footballer
- Emre Gürbüz (born 1991), Turkish footballer
- Emre İşçiler (born 1989), Turkish footballer
- Emre Kartari, Turkish jazz percussionist
- Emre Kongar (born 1941), Turkish social scientist, writer and author
- Emre Korkmaz (born 1986), Turkish actor
- Emre Kızılkaya (born 1982), Turkish journalist
- Emre Miyasoğlu (born 1981), Turkish writer
- Emre Mor (born 1997), Danish-Turkish Player
- Emre Nefiz (born 1994), Turkish footballer
- Emre Ozdemir (born 1981), Turkish editorial cartoonist and illustrator
- Emre Özkan (born 1988), Turkish footballer
- Emre Öztürk (footballer) (born 1986), German footballer
- Emre Sabuncuoğlu (born 1976), Turkish classical guitarist
- Emre Sahin, Turkish director
- Emre Şimşek (born 1987), Turkish alpine skier
- Emre Taner (born 1942), Turkish civil servant
- Emre Torun (born 1993), Turkish footballer
- Emre Törün (1972–2025), Turkish actor
- Emre Ünver (born 1981), Dutch politician
- Emre Urgenc (born 1983), Adult Performer
- Emre Vefa Göktaş (born 2001), Turkish karateka
- Emre Yüksektepe (born 1991), Turkish footballer
- Yunus Emre Arslan (born 2005), Turkish archer
- Yusuf Emre Fırat (born 2000), Turkish cross-country skier

== Fictional characters ==
- Emre Ogan, a character in The Promise (2016)
- Emre (Overwatch), a character in Overwatch (2016)

== See also ==
- Emre (surname)
