= Emigholz =

Emigholz is a German-language surname. It literally means "Emig's wood": Emig is a diminutive of Emmerich. Notable people with the surname include:

- Heinz Emigholz (born 1948), German filmmaker, actor, artist, writer and producer
- Carmen Emigholz (born 1962), German politician
