= Emmerich =

Emmerich may refer to:

== Places ==
- Emmerich am Rhein, city in North Rhine-Westphalia, Germany
  - Emmerich Rhine Bridge
  - Emmerich station
- Emmerich, Wisconsin, unincorporated community in the town of Berlin, Wisconsin, United States

== Other uses ==
- Emmerich (name), a given name and a surname (including a list of people and fictional characters with the name)
- Mount Emmerich, a mountain in Alaska
- Emmerich Newspapers, a newspaper company based in Mississippi.

== See also ==
- Amalaric (died 531), King of the Visigoths
- Haimirich, a surname
- Aimery (disambiguation) (also Aimery, Amalrich), French forms
- Amerigo (disambiguation) (also Emerico, Almerigo, Almerico, Aimerico), Italian forms
- Imre, Hungarian form
