= Emre (disambiguation) =

Emre is a Turkish male given name.

Emre may also refer to:

- Emre, Bandırma, a village
- Emre, Köprüköy
- Emre (surname)
- Emre (Dark Matter), a music album
