= Emery (name) =

- Gender: Unisex
- Language: English

Origin
- Languages: English, French
- Region of origin: England, France

Other names
- Variant form: Emory
- Related names: Emerson, Emmerich

Emery is both a given name and an English and French surname.

Emery may refer to:

== Given name ==
- Emery Barnes (1929–1998), football player and Canadian politician
- Emery G. Barrette (1930–1993), American politician and Methodist minister
- Emery Bonett (1906–1995), English author and playwright
- Emery Emery (born 1963), American comedian, film editor and producer, and outspoken atheist
- Emery Hawkins (1912–1989), American animator and director
- Emery Jones Jr. (born 2004), American football player
- Emery LeCrone (born 1986), American dancer and choreographer
- Emery Lehman (born 1996), American Olympic speed skater
- Emery Moorehead (born 1954), tight end/wide receiver in the National Football League
- Emery Walker (1851–1933), English engraver, photographer and printer
- Emery Welshman (born 1991), Guyanese footballer

== Middle name ==
- George Washington Emery Dorsey (1842–1911), U.S. Congressional Representative from Nebraska
- Gilbert Emery Bensley Pottle (1875–1945), American actor better known by his stage name, Gilbert Emery
- Roy Emery Dunn (1886–1985), American businessman and politician

== Surname ==
- Alan R. Emery (born 1939), Canadian marine biologist
- Alison Emery (born 1989), British ice hockey player
- Benoit Pierre Emery (born 1970), French fashion designer
- Brook Emery (born 1949), Australian poet, educator, and surf lifesaver.
- Carla Emery (1939-2005), American writer
- Carlo Emery (1848–1925), Italian entomologist
- Chris Hamilton-Emery (born 1963), British poet and literary publisher
- Christopher Emery (born 1957), American government official and author
- Colin Emery (born 1946), Scottish footballer
- Dave Emery (born 1948), American politician
- Dennis Emery (1933–1986), English footballer
- Dick Emery (1915–1983), British comedian and actor
- Don Emery (1920–1993), Welsh footballer
- E. J. Emery (born 2006), American ice hockey player
- Emery Emery (born 1963), American comedian and film producer
- Fred Emery (footballer) (1900–1959), English footballer
- Freddie Emery-Wallis (1927–2017), British politician
- Frederick Edmund Emery (1925–1997), Australian scientist
- Gareth Emery (born 1980), British music producer and DJ
- George W. Emery (1830–1909), American politician
- Georgia Emery (1867–1931), American businesswoman
- Gideon Emery (born 1972), English singer and film and voice actor
- Gilles Emery (born 1962), Swiss theologian
- Herb Emery, Canadian economist
- Irene Emery (1900–1981), American art historian, scholar, curator, textile anthropologist, sculptor, and modern dancer
- Jackson Emery (born 1987), American basketball player
- John Emery (disambiguation), multiple people
- Joseph Stickney Emery, man after whom Emeryville, California was named in 1896
- Kenneth O. Emery (1914–1998), Canadian-American marine geologist
- Linda Emery (born 1945), American wife of Bruce Lee
- Marc Emery (born 1958), Canadian activist and entrepreneur
- Maunga Emery (1933–2011), New Zealand rugby player
- Nicholas Emery (1776–1861), American politician and judge
- Nigel Westbrook Emery (born 1949); see Brook Emery.
- Paul Emery (1916–1993), English racing driver
- Peter Emery (1926–2004), British politician
- Phil Emery (born 1964), Australian cricketer
- Phil Emery (American football) (born 1959), American football scout and coach
- Ralph Emery (1933–2022), American country music disc jockey, radio and television host
- Ray Emery (1982–2018), Canadian ice-hockey goaltender
- Ray Emery (cricketer) (1915–1982), New Zealand cricketer and pilot
- Robert W. Emery, American gymnast
- Roe Emery (1874–1953), American businessman
- Sid Emery (1885–1967), Australian cricketer
- Unai Emery (born 1971), Spanish football coach
- Victor Emery (1934–2002), British physicist
- Walter Bryan Emery (1903–1971), British Egyptologist
- Warren Zaïre-Emery (born 2006), French footballer
- William Emery (priest) (1825–1910), British archdeacon
- William Emery (MP) (died 1432), Member of Parliament for Canterbury

== See also ==
- Emory (name)
