= Emory (name) =

Emory (/ˈɛməriː/ EM-ə-ree) is an English language given name, a variant spelling of Emery, of Old German origin (meaning 'home strength, industrious leader'). Emory is also an English language surname.

== Given name ==
Emory
- Gender: Unisex
- Language: English

Origin
- Language: English German
- Meaning: "home strength, industrious leader"

Other names
- Related names: Emery Emmerich

People with the given name include:

- Emory Bellard (1927–2011), American college football coach
- Emory L. Bennett (1929–1951), American soldier awarded Medal of Honor
- Emory S. Bogardus (1882–1973), American sociologist who founded the sociology department at the University of Southern California
- Emory Campbell, Gullah community leader of South Carolina and Georgia, USA
- Emory Cohen (born 1990), American actor
- Emory Leon Chaffee (1885–1975), American physicist
- Emory Douglas (born 1943), American graphic designer for the Black Panther Party
- Emory Ellis (1906–2003), American biochemist
- Emory Folmar (1930–2011), American politician
- Emory Hale (1969–2006), American professional wrestler
- Emory Holloway (1885–1977), American author
- Emory Richard Johnson (1864-1950), American economist
- Emory Jones (born 2000), American football player
- Emory King (1931–2007), Belizean historian, author and journalist
- Emory S. Land (1879–1971), American Naval officer
- Emory Long (1911–1976), American baseball player
- Emory Conrad Malick (1881–1959), American aviator
- Emory McClintock (1840–1916), American actuary
- Emory B. Pottle (1815–1891), American politician
- Emory H. Price (1899–1976), American politician
- Emory Rains (1800–1878), American politician
- Emory Remington (1891–1971), American trombonist
- Emory Sekaquaptewa (1928–2007), American Hopi leader and scholar
- Emory M. Sneeden (1927–1987), American judge
- Emory Sparrow (1897–1965), American professional hockey forward
- Emory Tate (1958–2015), American International Master of chess
- Emory Andrew Tate III (born 1986) British-American internet personality and kickboxer
- Emory M. Thomas (born 1939), American university professor
- Emory Upton (1839–1881), American general
- Emory Washburn (1800–1877), American politician

People with the surname Emory include:

- D. Hopper Emory (1841–1916), American politician
- Dave Emory (born 1949), American talk radio host
- Ed Emory (1937–2013), American football coach
- John Emory (1789–1835), American Methodist bishop, eponym of Emory University
- Julia Emory (1885–1979), American suffragist
- Kenneth Emory (1897–1992), American anthropologist
- Logan Emory (born 1988), American soccer player
- Ron Emory (born 1962), American rock musician, member of TSOL
- Sonny Emory (born 1962), American drummer
- Steven Emory (born 1989), American soccer player
- Tremaine Emory, American designer
- William Hemsley Emory (1811–1887), American army officer and surveyor

== Fictional characters ==
Fictional characters with the name include:

- Emory, an Aqua Teen Hunger Force character
- Emory Bortz, a professor of Jacobean tragedies in The Crying of Lot 49 by Thomas Pynchon.

== See also ==
- Emery
