= Emmich =

Emmich is a surname. Notable people with the surname include:

- Val Emmich (born 1979), American writer, singer-songwriter, and actor
- Otto von Emmich (1848–1915), Prussian general
- Cliff Emmich (1936–2022), American actor

== See also ==
- Emich
