= Imre (disambiguation) =

Imre is a Hungarian masculine given name.

Imre may also refer to:

- Imre (surname)
- Imre: A Memorandum, 1906 novel by Edward Irenaeus Prime-Stevenson
