= Americus =

Americus may refer to:

== Places in the United States ==
- Americus, Georgia, a city with a population of around 17,000
- Americus, Indiana, a small town in Washington Township
- Americus, Kansas, a city with a population of around 900
- Americus, Missouri, an unincorporated community
- Americus Township, Lyon County, Kansas

== People ==
- Americus (given name)
- Americus Backers (died 1778), described as the father of the English grand pianoforte style
- Americus Mayo (died 1891), American politician, state legislator in Arkansas
- Americus Vespucius Rice (1835–1904), American politician, banker, and businessman
- Amerigo Vespucci (1454–1512) Italian merchant, explorer and cartographer whose first name was Americus in Latin
- Saint Emeric of Hungary (died 1031), also known as Saint Americus or Emeric, a Hungarian prince
- Americus Symmes (1811–1896), son of John Cleves Symmes Jr.

== Other uses ==
- Americus (baseball team), a minor league club that represented the city of Americus, Georgia
- Americus Historic District in Americus, Georgia, US
- Americus Hotel, historic building in Allentown, Pennsylvania, US
- Americus, Preston and Lumpkin Railroad, historic railroad that operated in the states of Georgia and Alabama
- Americus (horse) (died 1910), an American Thoroughbred racehorse
- Americus, a 2011 graphic novel by M. K. Reed, published by First Second Books
