= YGA =

YGA can refer to:

- YGA (magazine), an LGBT periodical
- Young Guru Academy, a Turkish non-profit
- Yuegang'ao Greater Bay Area, a region in southern China
- Lac Gagnon Water Aerodrome, a defunct Canadian airfield (IATA code: YGA)
