= Amauri (disambiguation) =

Amauri (born 1980), Amauri Carvalho de Oliveira, is an Italian football striker

Amauri may also refer to:

- Amauri d'Acigné (died 1477), French Roman Catholic prelate
- Amauri (footballer, born 1942), Amauri Alvès Horta, Brazilian football forward
- Amauri Ribeiro (born 1959), Brazilian volleyball player
- Amauri Torezan (born 1972), Brazilian abstract artist
- Amauri Sanit (born 1979), Cuban baseball player
- Amauri (footballer, born 1982), Amauri Morais Pereira, Brazilian football forward
- Amauri Hardy (born 1998), American basketball player

== See also ==
- Amaury (disambiguation)
- Amauris, genus of butterflies
