= Imra (disambiguation) =

Imra was the chief pre-Islamic god of the Nuristani people.

Imra or IMRA may also refer to:

- Imra Agotić (1943-2012), Croatian general
- Imra Ardeen, better known as Saturn Girl, a DC Comics character
- Irish Mountain Rescue Association - see Mountain Rescue Ireland

== See also ==
- I. M. R. A. Iriyagolla (1907-1973), Sri Lankan politician
- Irma (disambiguation)
- Imre (disambiguation)
