= Imre =

Male given name

Imre (Hungarian pronunciation: [ˈimrɛ]) is a Hungarian masculine first name, which is also in Estonian use, where the corresponding name day is 10 April. It has been suggested that it relates to the name Emeric, Emmerich or Heinrich. Its English equivalents are Emery, Henry, and Hendrick.

Bearers of the name include the following (who generally held Hungarian nationality, unless otherwise noted):

- Imre Antal (1935–2008), pianist
- Imre Bajor (1957–2014), actor
- Imre Bebek (d. 1395), baron
- Imre Bródy (1891–1944), physicist
- Imre Bujdosó (born 1959), Olympic fencer
- Imre Csáky (cardinal) (1672–1732), Roman Catholic cardinal
- Imre Csermelyi (born 1988), football player
- Imre Cseszneky (1804–1874), agriculturist and patriot
- Imre Csiszár (born 1938), mathematician
- Imre Csösz (born 1969), Olympic judoka
- Imre Czobor (1520–1581), Noble and statesman
- Imre Czomba (born 1972), Composer and musician
- Imre Deme (born 1983), football player
- Imre Erdődy (1889–1973), Olympic gymnast
- Imre Farkas (1879–1976), musician
- Imre Farkas (1935–2020), Olympic canoeist
- Imre Finta (1911–2003), indicted war criminal
- Imre Földi (1938–2017), Olympic weightlifter
- Imre Friedmann (1921–2007), biologist
- Imre Frivaldszky (1799–1870), botanist and entomologist
- Imre Garaba (born 1958), football player
- Imre Gedővári (1951–2014), Olympic fencer
- Imre Gellért (1888–1981), Olympic gymnast
- Imre Gyöngyössy (1930–1994), film director and screenwriter
- Imre Harangi (1913–1979), Olympic boxer
- Imre Hódos (1928–1989), Olympic wrestler
- Imre Hollai (1925–2017), diplomat, President of the United Nations General Assembly
- Imre Jenei (born 1937), Romanian (Hungarian ethnic) football player and coach
- Imre Kálmán (1882–1953), operetta composer
- Imre Kertész (1929–2016), author and winner of the 2002 Nobel Prize in Literature
- Imre Komora (1940–2024), football player
- Imre König (1899–1992), chess master
- Imre Lakatos (1922–1974), philosopher of mathematics and science
- Imre Leader (born 1963), British mathematician
- Imre Lichtenfeld (1910–1998), Hungarian-born Israeli martial artist
- Imre Letay (born c. 1910), Hungarian businessman in iron mining in Chile
- Imre Madách (1823–1864), writer, poet, lawyer and politician
- Imre Makovecz (1935–2011), architect
- Imre Mándi (1916–1945), Olympic boxer
- Imre Mikó (1805–1876), Statesman, politician, economist, historian and patron from Transylvania, who served as Minister of Public Works and Transport of Hungary between 1867 and 1870
- Imre Mudin (1887–1918), Olympic track and field athlete
- Imre Nagy (1896–1958), politician, twice Prime Minister of Hungary, key figure of the Hungarian Revolution of 1956
- Imre Nagy (1933–2013), Olympic pentathlete
- Imre Németh (1917–1989), Olympic hammer thrower
- Imre of Hungary (c. 1007–1031), prince and Roman Catholic saint
- Imre of Hungary (1174–1204), King of Hungary
- Imre Páli (1909–?), Olympic handballer
- Imre Polyák (1932–2010), Olympic wrestler
- Imre Pozsgay (1933–2016), reform Communist politician
- Imre Pulai (born 1967), Olympic canoer
- Imre Rapp (1937–2015), football player
- Imre Ritter (born 1952), politician
- Imre Salusinszky (born 1955), Australian newspaper columnist
- Imre Schlosser (1889–1959), football player
- Imre Senkey (1898–?), football player and manager
- Imre Sooäär (born 1969), Estonian politician
- Imre Sőrés (1907–1986), Hungarian art director
- Imre Steindl (1839–1902), architect
- Imre Szabics (born 1981), football player
- Imre Szekeres (born 1950), politician and Minister of Defence
- Imre Szellő (born 1983), Olympic boxer
- Imre Szentpály (1904–1987), Olympic polo player
- Imre Taussig (1894–1945), Hungarian footballer
- Imre Taveter (1967–2026), Estonian sport sailor
- Imre Thököly (1657–1705), statesman, leader of an anti-Habsburg uprising, Prince of Transylvania
- Imre Tiidemann (born 1970), Estonian modern pentathlete
- Imre Tiitsu (born 1980), Estonian ice sledge hockey player
- Imre Tóth (born 1985), Grand Prix motorcycle racer
- Imre Trencsényi-Waldapfel (1908–1970), Hungarian scholar
- Imre Varadi (born 1959), English football player
- Imre Weisshaus (1905–1987), Hungarian-French pianist
- Imre Zachár (1890–1954), Olympic water polo player and swimmer
- Imre Zámbó (1958–2001), pop singer by the name of Jimmy Zámbó

== See also ==
- Imre (surname)
- Americus (disambiguation)
- Emre
- Haimirich
