= Queta =

Queta may refer to:

- A nickname for Enriqueta
  - Enriqueta "Queta" Basilio (1948–2019), Mexican Olympic athlete
  - Queta Carrasco (1913–1996), Mexican actress
  - Queta Claver (1929–2003), Spanish actress
  - Queta Lavat (1929–2023), Mexican actress
- Queta (moon), moon of the asteroid 3548 Eurybates
- Quetta, the capital city of the Pakistani province of Balochistan

== See also ==
- Quetta (disambiguation)
