= Counterfeit United States currency =

Attempting to mimic United States money

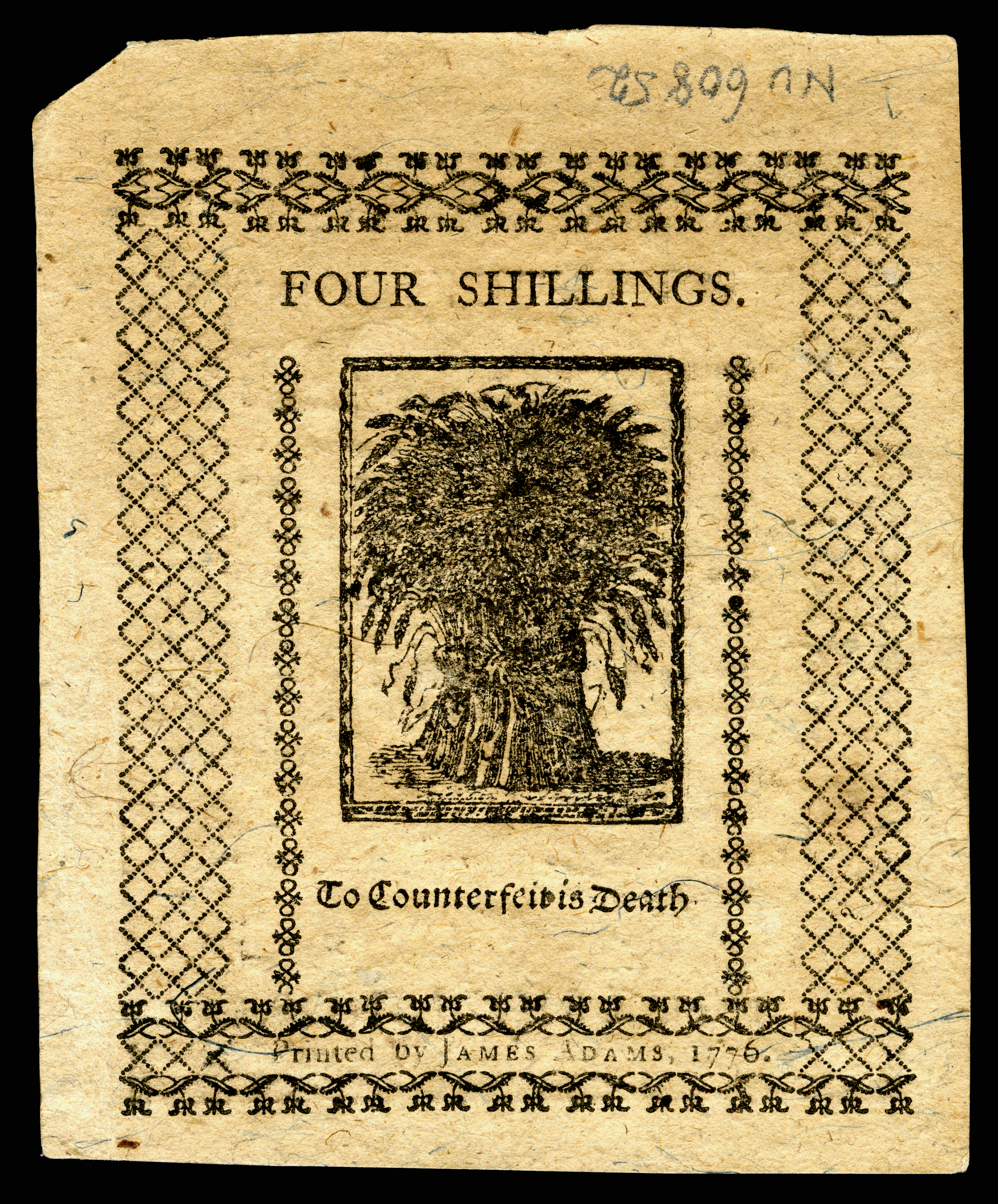
"To Counterfeit is Death" - counterfeit warning printed on the reverse of a 4 shilling Colonial currency in 1776 from Delaware Colony

American 18th–19th century iron counterfeit coin mold for making fake Spanish milled dollars and U.S. half dollars

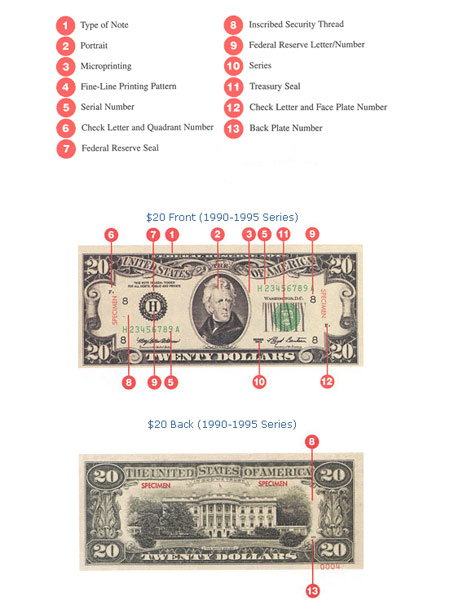
Anti-counterfeiting features on a series 1993 U.S. $20 bill

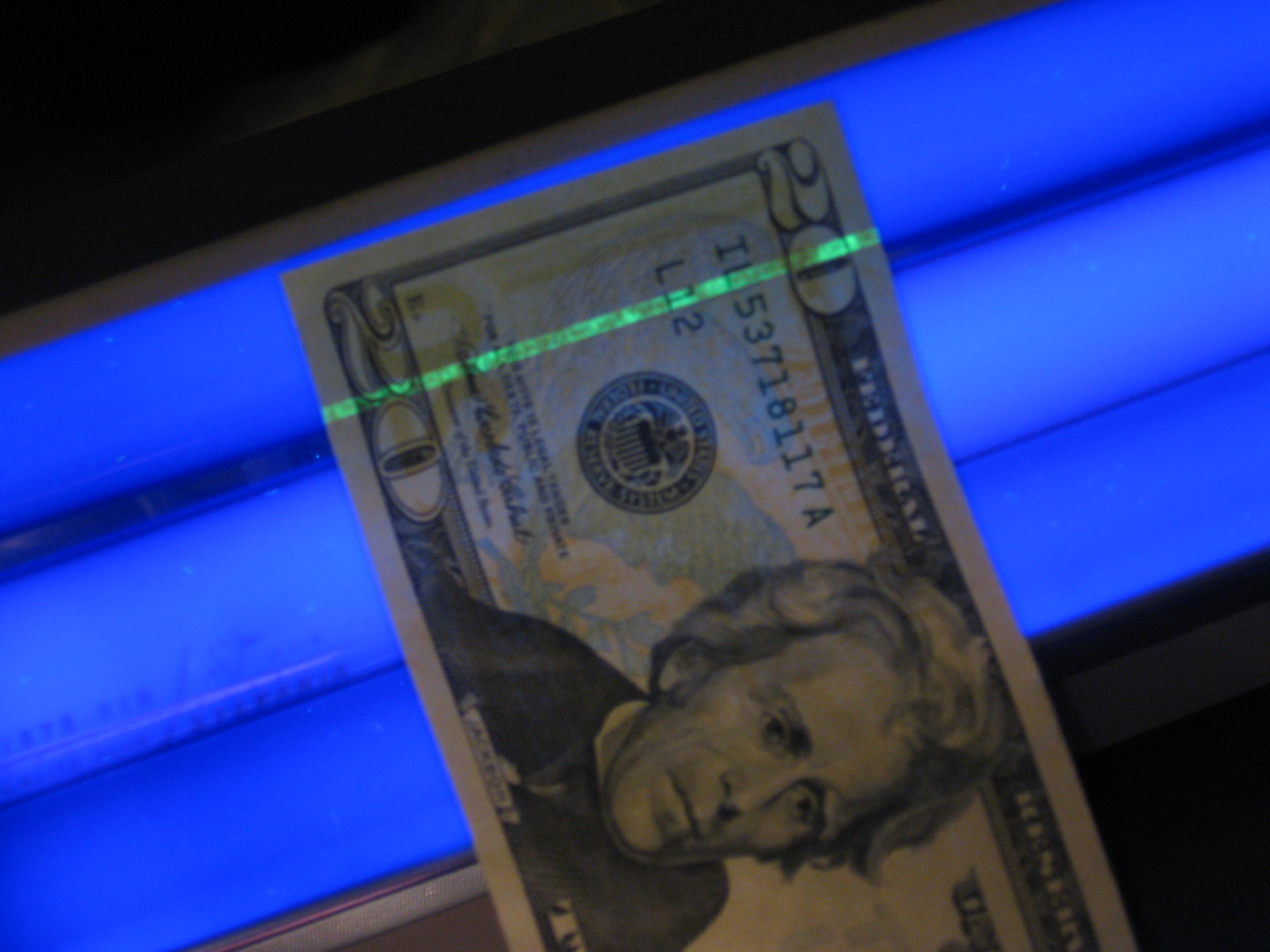
The security strip of a U.S. $20 bill glows under black light as a safeguard against counterfeiting

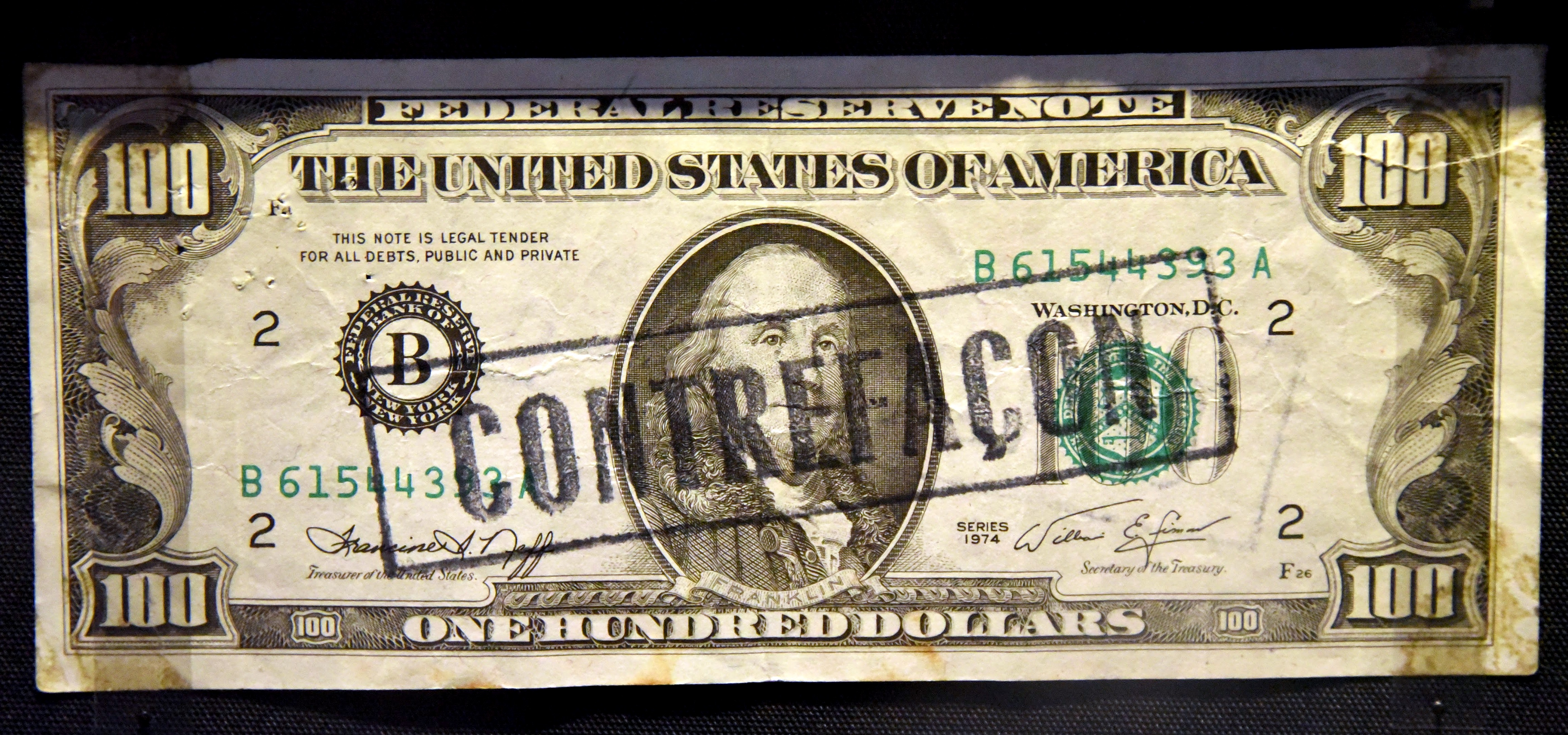
Counterfeit 100 dollar bill, series of 1974 but probably made later. Over-stamped with "Contrefaçon" on both sides. On display at the British Museum, London

Counterfeiting of the currency of the United States is widely attempted. According to the United States Department of Treasury, an estimated $70 million in counterfeit bills are in circulation, or approximately 1 note in counterfeits for every 10,000 in genuine currency, with an upper bound of $200 million counterfeit, or 1 counterfeit per 4,000 genuine notes. However, these numbers are based on annual seizure rates on counterfeiting, and the actual stock of counterfeit money is uncertain because some counterfeit notes successfully circulate for a few transactions.

== History ==
Article I, Section 8 of the U.S. Constitution gives Congress the power to "provide for the Punishment of counterfeiting the Securities and current Coin of the United States". This has been considered by federal courts to be an exception to freedom of speech.

Counterfeiting was so prevalent in the early nineteenth century that contemporary accounts like those from author John Neal claimed that as much as half of the US currency in circulation was counterfeit. By the 1830s, American newspapers began listing instructions for identifying counterfeits. Because currency was issued by individual banks, there were approximately 5,400 types of counterfeit bills in the US by the 1860s. Shortly after the Civil War, it was estimated that one third to one half of the nation's currency was counterfeit. Counterfeit money thus posed a major threat to the economy and financial system.

When the Secret Service was founded in 1865, its primary task was to minimize counterfeiting. In 2001, the U.S. Treasury estimated the prevalence of counterfeit U.S. currency in circulation at less than 0.01%.

=== Superdollar ===
Superdollars, very high quality counterfeit one hundred-dollar bills, were some of the most widely distributed counterfeit American dollar bills and were still being produced after 2007. The Congressional Research Service has conducted a study and concluded with an accusation that North Korea was responsible for their production, but Pyongyang denied any involvement with Superdollar.

=== Peru 2001 CB-B2 series $100 bill incident ===
In 2005, Peruvian Banks ceased to accept series 2001 US $100 bills with Federal Reserve district letter "B" (New York) due to the discovery of a large amount of counterfeit $100 bills in Peruvian circulation. Reportedly, these counterfeit bills were of such high quality, they were difficult to distinguish from genuine bills. According to Peruvian news reports, a printing plate from the Bureau of Engraving and Printing was stolen by a criminal, with possible links to al-Qaeda, and the plate was likely used to produce the counterfeit bills.

=== Operation Gait $100 bills ===
Bills forged by Anatasios Arnaouti in the UK (2005).

== "Federal Reserve Bonds" ==
In recent years, metal boxes of fraudulent Federal Reserve Notes in astronomically high denominations (often in $100 million, $500 million, or $1 billion) and often with coupons attached have turned up in various Eastern countries such as the Philippines or Malaysia. In many cases, the notes are claimed to be part of a lost trove of secretly issued Federal Reserve Notes, and are special or not known to the public due to secrecy. Also, the bonds are sometimes treated to make them look old by getting them wet and moldy. However, the Federal Reserve has never issued notes in such denominations, and has issued warnings against them on its website. Additionally, there are several errors in the bonds as well as the metal boxes, many of them anachronistic. The Federal Reserve Bank of New York writes that

The Federal Reserve is aware of several scams involving high denomination Federal Reserve notes and bonds, often in denominations of 100 million or 500 million dollars, dating back to the 1930s, usually 1934. In each of these schemes, fraudulent instruments are claimed to be part of a long-lost supply of recently discovered Federal Reserve notes or bonds.

Fraudsters often falsely claim that the purported Federal Reserve notes or bonds that they hold are somehow very special and are not known to the public because they are so secret. Fraudsters have attempted to sell these worthless instruments, or to redeem or exchange them at banks and other financial institutions, or to secure loans or obtain lines of credit using the fictitious instruments as collateral.

There have been several instances where people have used the fraudulent notes as legitimate currency, often resulting in arrest. In March 2006, agents from ICE and the Secret Service seized 250 notes, each bearing a denomination of $1,000,000,000 (one billion dollars) from a West Hollywood apartment. The suspect had previously been arrested on federal charges for attempting to smuggle more than $37,000 in currency into the U.S. following a trip to South Korea in 2002. Much of the artwork on the notes was duplicated from the real $1000 bill, including the portrait of Grover Cleveland. Another incident involving similar notes bearing a denomination each of $500,000,000, occurred in Chiasso, Switzerland, in June 2009.

== Materials and prevention ==
In the United States, counterfeiters in small operations develop the fake currency using tools which often include printers, an iron, and green colored water. Upon collecting bills, the Federal Reserve checks all notes, destroying any whose appearance fails to fit that of a federal bill.

== Notable American counterfeiters ==
- Peter Alston, the late 18th-century and early 19th-century counterfeiter and river pirate, who is believed to be Little Harpe's associate and partner in the murder of notorious outlaw leader Samuel Mason in 1803
- Philip Alston, was an 18th-century counterfeiter both before and after the American Revolution in Virginia and the Carolinas before the war, and later in Kentucky and Illinois afterwards.
- Edward Bonney, an alleged counterfeiter in northern Indiana, who escaped to Nauvoo, Illinois, was a bounty hunter and amateur detective, posed as a counterfeiter, to apprehend the murderers of Colonel George Davenport and infiltrate the Midwestern Banditti of the Prairie.
- Abel Buell, American colonialist and republican who went from altering five-pound note engraving plates to publishing the first map of the new United States created by an American.
- Mary Butterworth, a counterfeiter in colonial America.
- Mike DeBardeleben, was sent to prison for counterfeiting the $20 bill
- John Duff, was a counterfeiter, hunter, and soldier, who served in George Rogers Clark's campaign, to capture the Illinois country, for the Patriot American side, during the Revolutionary War.
- David Farnsworth, was a British Loyalist American counterfeiter and spy, in the American Revolutionary War. He was hanged for his crimes, after George Washington had taken a personalised interest in his case.
- Emerich Juettner aka Edward Mueller, documented in Mister 880, was possibly the longest uncaught counterfeiter in history. For ten or more years he eluded government authorities while he printed and spent fake $1 bills in his New York neighborhood.
- John A. Murrell, a bandit operating in the United States along the Mississippi River in the mid-nineteenth century. He was convicted for his crimes in the Circuit Court of Madison County, Tennessee, and incarcerated in the Tennessee State Penitentiary, modeled after the Auburn penal system, from 1834 to 1844.
- Sturdivant Gang, a multi-generational group of American counterfeiters whose criminal activities took place over a 50-year period from Colonial Connecticut to the Illinois frontier.
- Samuel C. Upham, the first known counterfeiter of Confederate money during the American Civil War. His activities began or became known in early July 1862.
- Arthur Williams, imprisoned in 2007 for counterfeiting the United States one hundred-dollar bill.

== See also ==
- Promotional United States fake currency
