= Patrick MacDowell =

Irish-born British sculptor (1799–1870)

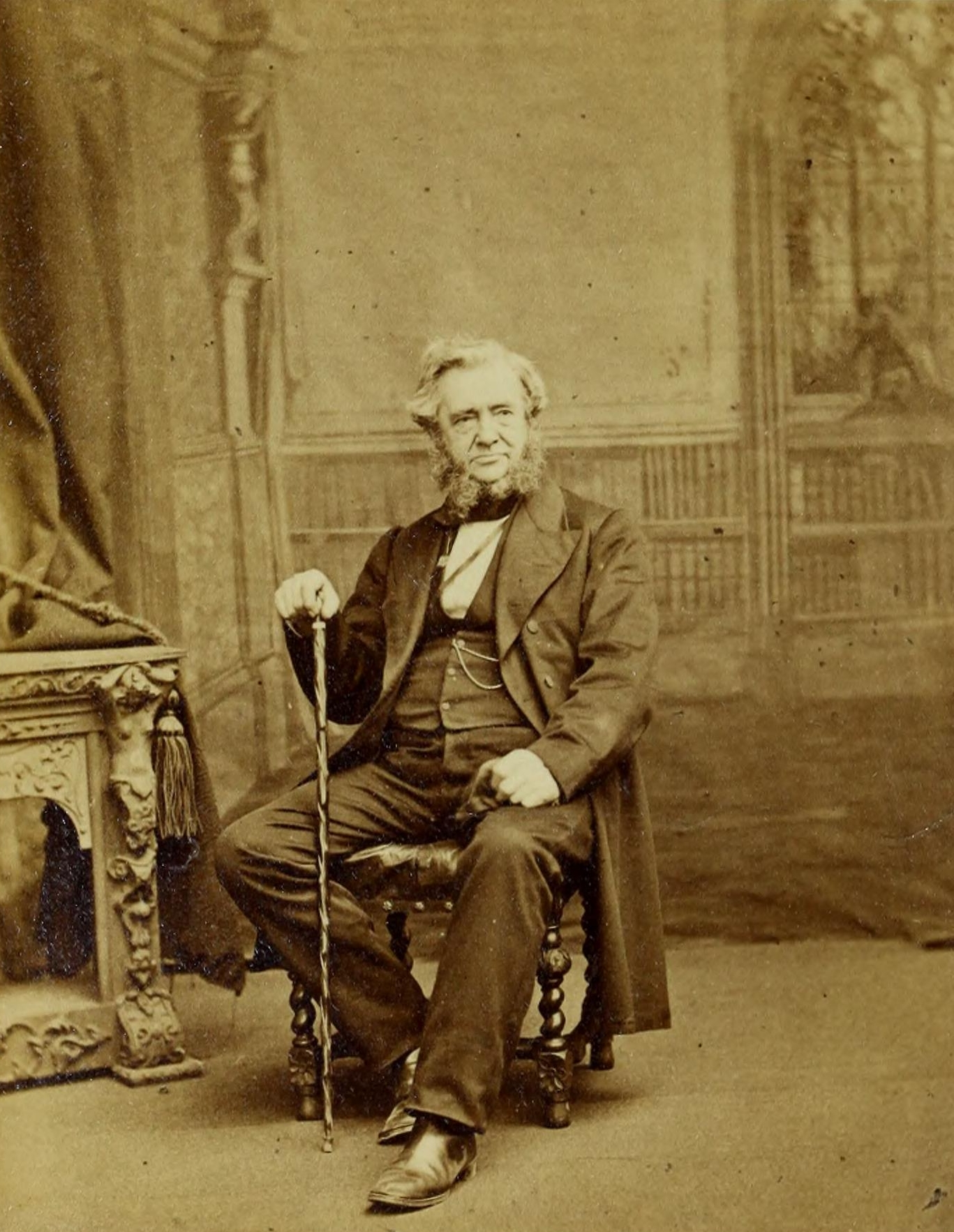
MacDowell, c. 1863

Patrick MacDowell RA (12 August 1799 – 9 December 1870) was an Irish-born British sculptor operating through the 19th century.

== Biography ==
MacDowell was born in Belfast, on 12 August 1799. His father died whilst he was young and the family lived in relative poverty.

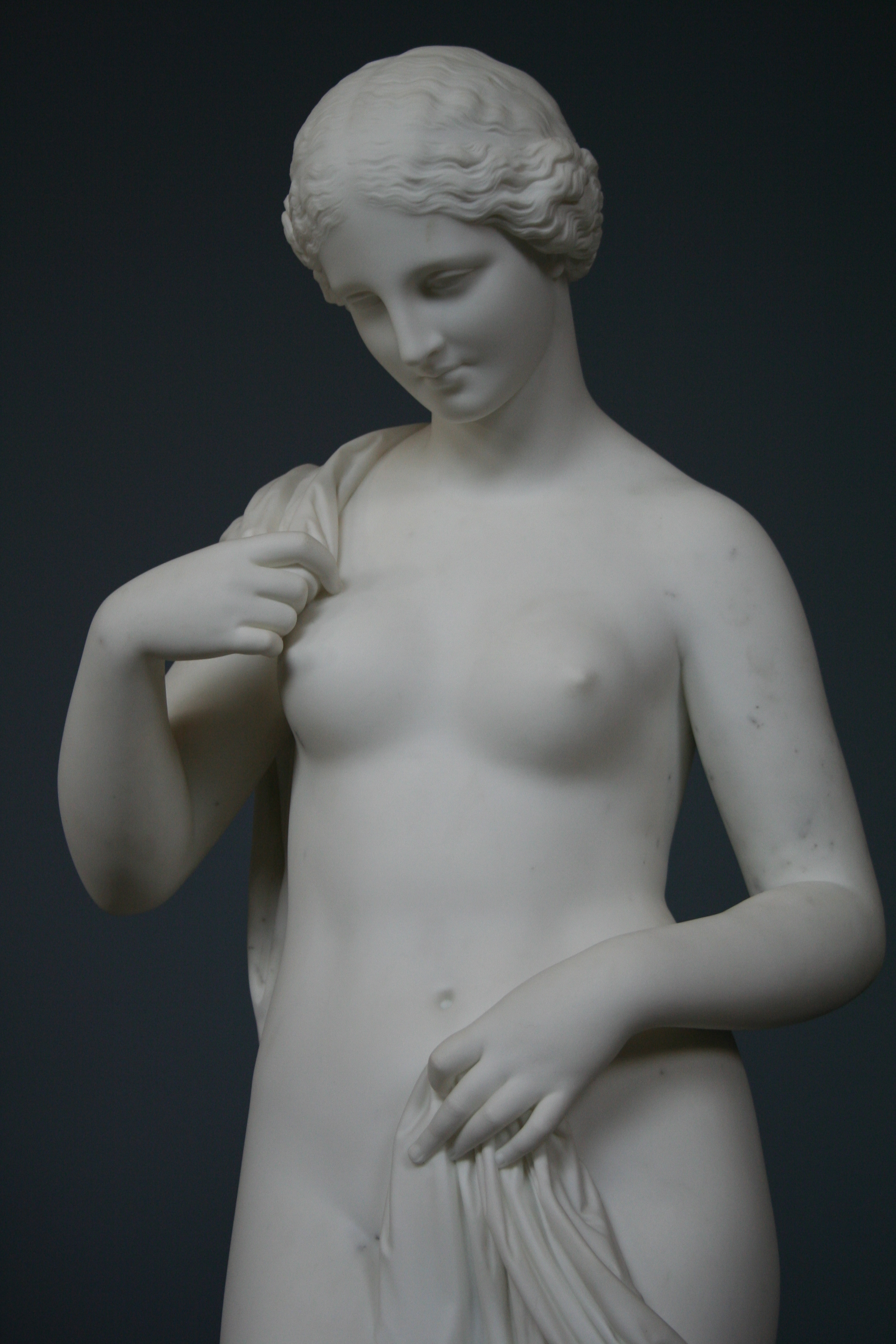
Daydream, 1853, Ny Carlsberg Glyptotek, Copenhagen

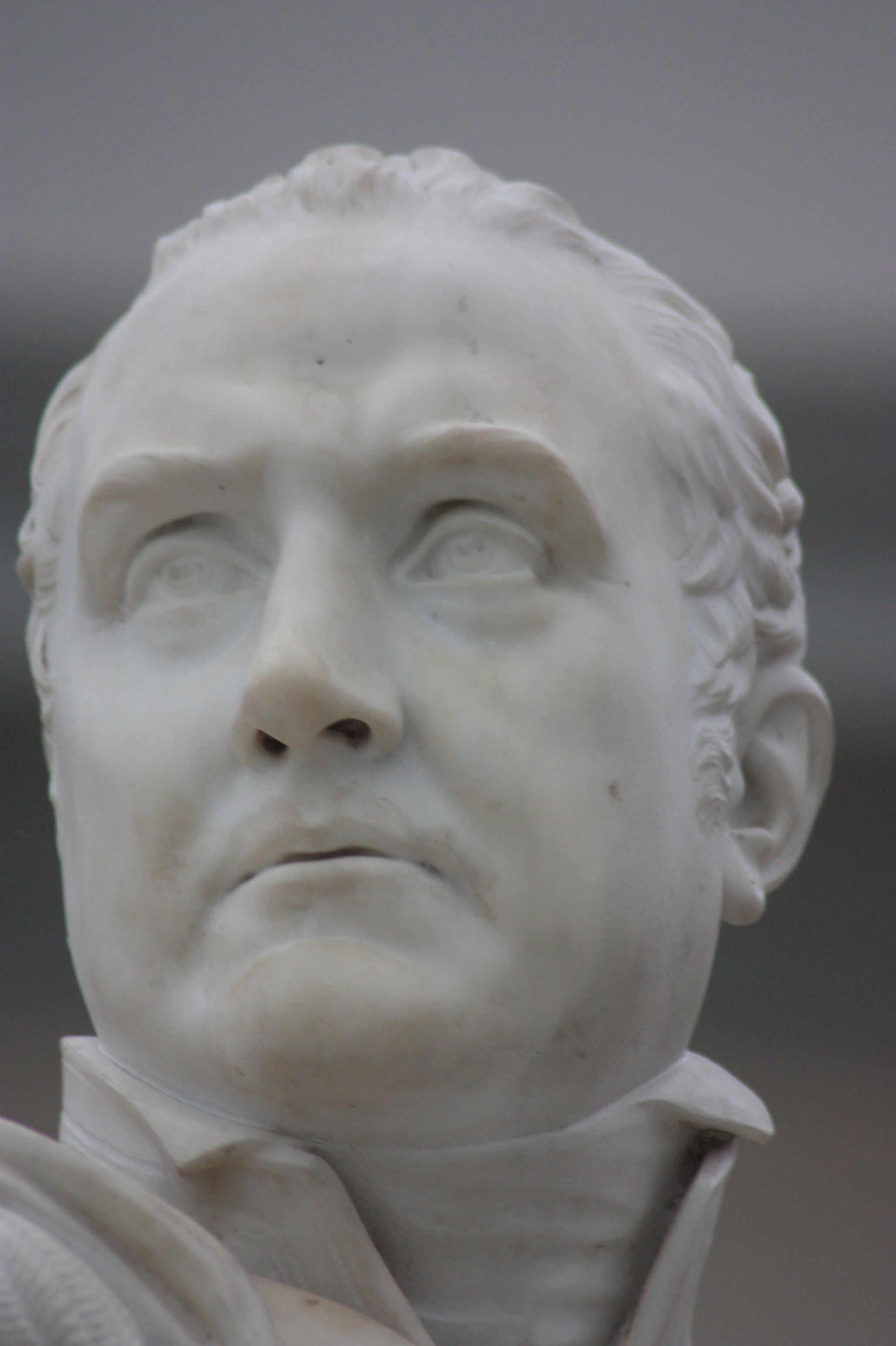
Sir Edward Pellew by Patrick MacDowell, 1846, Greenwich Maritime Museum, London (close-up)

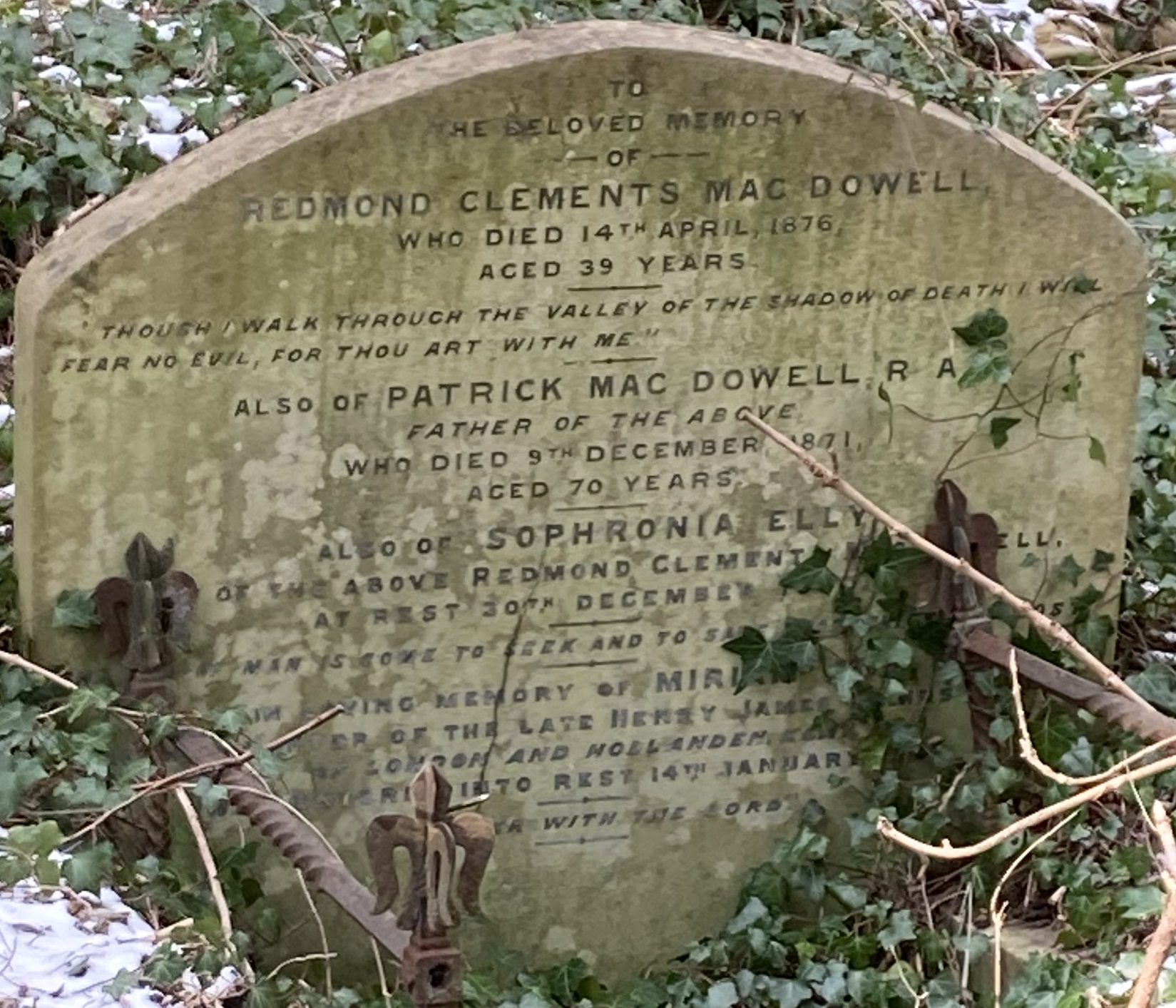
Grave of Patrick MacDowell in Highgate Cemetery

From 1807 to 1811, he boarded at a school in Belfast, run by an engraver named Gordon, who encouraged his attempts at drawing, and from 1811 to 1813 he was under the tuition of a clergyman in Hampshire.

Around 1811, he moved with his mother to Hampshire in England, where they had relatives. In 1813, at age 14 (the then standard age to begin apprenticeships), he was apprenticed to a coach-builder in London. However, his master went bankrupt and his training as a coach-builder ended abruptly. During this time he was lodging in the house of Pierre Francois Chenu, the sculptor. It is presumed that this engendered an interest in sculpture within the young MacDowell.

On the recommendation of John Constable the painter, he went to the Royal Academy Schools and he exhibited at the academy from 1822 until his death.

He was elected a Member on 10 February 1846 and presented as his diploma work a "Nymph.".

== Death ==
MacDowell died at his home in Wood Lane, Highgate, London on 9 December 1870, aged 71, and was buried on the eastern side of Highgate Cemetery. His gravestone incorrectly records the year of his death as 1871.

== Other works ==
MacDowell's works include a statue of Sir William Brown in the Great Hall of St George's Hall, Liverpool. His life-size memorial, in marble, to the young Earl of Belfast (died 1853) showing the deceased on his deathbed attended by his mother, was in Belfast Castle Chapel. It was moved to Belfast City Hall.

A statue of Sir Edward Pellew, 1st Viscount Exmouth by MacDowell stands in the centre of the Greenwich Maritime Museum.

His last major work was the Europe allegorical group at the Albert Memorial in London.

- Monument to Catherine Spurway at Milverton, Somerset (1845)
- Statue of the Earl of Warren in the House of Lords (1850)
- Statue of Almeric in the House of Lords (1850)
- Statue at the grave of William Turner in St Paul's Cathedral (1851)
- Monument to the Marchioness of Donegal in Belfast Castle Chapel (1855)
- Statue of the Earl of Belfast in Belfast Free Library (1855)
- Statue of William Pitt the Younger in the Palace of Westminster (1857)
- Statue of the Earl of Chatham in the Palace of Westminster (1857)
- Statue of Viscount Fitzgibbon in Limerick (1858) replaced in 1916 by a monument to the Easter Uprising
- Statue of Sir William Brown at St George's Hall, Liverpool (1858)
- Statue of Lord Plunket in the Four Courts, Dublin (1863)
- Statue of Earl of Eglinton for St Stephen's Green in Dublin (1866), blown up by the IRA in 1958

== See also ==
- List of Northern Irish artists

== Notes ==
Attribution

This article incorporates text from a publication now in the public domain: Graves, Robert Edmund (1893). "MacDowell, Patrick". In Lee, Sidney (ed.). Dictionary of National Biography. Vol. 35. London: Smith, Elder & Co.
