= Emmrich =

Emmrich is a German surname. Notable people with the surname include:

- Hermann Friedrich Emmrich (1815–1879), German geologist
- Mandy Emmrich (born 1980), German rower
- Martin Emmrich (born 1984), former German tennis player
- Rolf Emmrich (1910–1974), German professor of internal medicine
- Thomas Emmrich (born 1953), former East German tennis player

== See also ==
- Emmerich (name)
- Emmerich (disambiguation)
