= Emick =

Emick is a German language surname, a variant of Emig. Notable people with the name include:

- Buzz Emick (1939-2014), American attorney
- Jarrod Emick (born 1969), an American actor

== See also ==
- Emich, lists other variants of the name
