= Amalric =

Named derived from the Gothic language

- Gender: Masculine
- Language: Gothic

Origin
- Meaning: Ruler of the Amali

Other names
- Alternative spelling: Amalaric
- Variant form: Americ
- Cognate: Emeric
- Derived: Amal
- Related names: Almerich

Amalric or Amalaric (also Americ, Almerich, Emerich, Emeric, Emerick, Emerik and other variations) is a personal name derived from the tribal name Amal (referring to the Gothic Amali) and ric (Gothic reiks) meaning "ruler, prince".

Equivalents in different languages include:

- English: Amery, Amory, Emery, Emory
- French: Amaury (surname/given name), Amalric (surname), Amaurich (surname), Maury (surname)
- German: Amalrich, Emmerich
- Italian: Amerigo, Arrigo
- Hungarian: Imre
- Latin: Amalricus, Americus, Almericus, Emericus
- Greek: Έμέρικος (Emérikos)
- Polish: Amalaryk, Amalryk, Emeryk
- Dutch: Emmerik, Amerik, Hamelink, Hamelryck
- Portuguese: Amáuri, Américo
- Spanish: Amauri, Américo
- Serbo-Croatian: Emerik/Емерик
- Arabic: عَمُورِي (ʻAmūrī)

== Given name ==
- Amalaric (502–531), King of the Visigoths from 526 to 531
- Malaric (fl. 585), King of the Suevi
- Amaury, Count of Valenciennes (fl. 953–973)
- Amalric of Nesle (fl. 1151–1180), Patriarch of Jerusalem from 1158 to 1180
- Amalric, King of Jerusalem (1136–1174), King of Jerusalem from 1163 to 1174
- Aimery of Cyprus (bef. 1155–1205), King of Jerusalem from 1198 to 1205, Lord of Cyprus from 1194 to 1196 and King of Cyprus from 1196 to 1205
- Amalric of Bena (fl. 1200–1204), French theologian
- Arnaud Amalric (fl. 1196–1225), seventeenth abbot of Citeaux
- Amaury de Montfort, several individuals including:
  - Amaury de Montfort (died 1241) (1195–1241), crusader
- Amalric, Lord of Tyre (c. 1272–1310), Governor of Cyprus from 1306 to 1310
- Amerigo Vespucci (1451–1512), Italian merchant, explorer, and navigator from the Republic of Florence, from whose name the term "America" is derived.
- Louis Marie Jacques Amalric de Narbonne-Lara (1755–1813), vicomte de Narbonne-Lara, French nobleman, soldier and diplomat

== Surname ==
- Arnaud Amalric (died 1225), Cistercian abbot
- Catherine Amalric (born 1964), French politician
- Mathieu Amalric (born 1965), French actor and director
- Leonid Amalrik (1905–1997), Soviet animator
- Andrei Amalrik (1938–1980), Soviet dissident

== See also ==
- Almeric, a given name
- Amaury (disambiguation), a French alternative spelling
- Emery (name)
