= Where the Heart Is (2000 film) =

- Theatrical release poster
- Directed by: Matt Williams
- Screenplay by: Lowell Ganz; Babaloo Mandel
- Based on: Where the Heart Is by Billie Letts
- Produced by: Susan Cartsonis; David McFadzean; Patricia Whitcher; Matt Williams
- Starring: Natalie Portman; Ashley Judd; Stockard Channing; Joan Cusack
- Cinematography: Richard Greatrex
- Edited by: Ian Crafford
- Music by: Mason Daring
- Production company: Wind Dancer Films
- Distributed by: 20th Century Fox
- Release date: April 28, 2000
- Running time: 120 minutes
- Country: United States
- Language: English
- Budget: $15 million
- Box office: $40 million

Where the Heart Is is a 2000 American romantic drama film directed by Matt Williams. It stars Natalie Portman, Stockard Channing, Ashley Judd, and Joan Cusack, with James Frain, Dylan Bruno, Keith David, and Sally Field appearing in supporting roles. The screenplay, written by Lowell Ganz and Babaloo Mandel, is based on the best-selling 1995 novel of the same name by Billie Letts.

The film follows five years in the life of Novalee Nation, a pregnant 17-year-old who is abandoned by her boyfriend at a Walmart in a small Oklahoma town. She secretly moves into the store, where she eventually gives birth to her baby, which attracts media attention. With the help of friends, she makes a new life for herself in the town.

== Plot ==
Novalee Nation — a seventeen-year-old who is seven months pregnant and has an aversion to the number five — is abandoned by her boyfriend, Willy Jack Pickens, at a Walmart store in Sequoyah, Oklahoma, when they stop to buy shoes. While stranded, she befriends Thelma "Sister" Husband, who initially mistakes Novalee for an old acquaintance and presents her with a buckeye tree. She also meets local photographer Moses Whitecotton, who advises her to give her baby a strong name. Meanwhile, Willy Jack continues his trip to California and is arrested for transporting a minor named Jolene across state lines while in possession of goods that Jolene stole from a 7-Eleven.

Novalee becomes acquainted with surly librarian Forney Hull, who cares for his ailing sister, Mary Elizabeth. Forney later spots Novalee entering Walmart. During a thunderstorm, Novalee — who has been living undetected inside the Walmart — goes into labor. Forney helps deliver the child, a baby girl whom Novalee names Americus. Novalee instantly becomes a media sensation and is befriended by local nurse Lexie Coop. Her estranged mother, Mama Lil, whom Novalee has not seen since being abandoned on her fifth birthday, visits after seeing her daughter on television. However, Mama Lil soon vanishes with the cash donations sent by well-wishers, prompting Sister Husband to take in both Novalee and Americus.

Upon his release from prison, Willy Jack travels to Santa Fe. He teams up with cranky music agent Ruth Meyers, who gives him the stage name "Billy Shadow."

Three years later, as Willy Jack's song plays on the radio, Sister Husband and Americus sing along to it in the kitchen. Novalee dislikes the song because "something about that guy's voice rubs her the wrong way"; although it sounds familiar because he is her ex-boyfriend, she remains unaware that it is actually him.

Novalee trains as a photographer under Moses' mentorship while working at Walmart. A tornado sweeps through Sequoyah, damaging the trailer and killing Sister Husband while she is out delivering potato soup to an ailing friend. Novalee later discovers that she is the sole beneficiary of Sister's estate and builds a new home for herself and Americus.

After an encounter with music agent Johnny DeSotto, Willy narrowly misses running into Novalee, who arrives at a Las Vegas hotel to accept an award for a photo contest after submitting an image of Americus and the surviving buckeye tree amid the storm's aftermath. Later, Ruth informs Willy Jack that his former cellmate is suing him for plagiarism. Ruth drops him as a client while noting she is aware of his meeting with DeSotto.

Upon returning to Sequoyah, Novalee discovers that Lexie has been battered by a new boyfriend who also molested her two eldest children. Lexie's injuries prevent her from working as a nurse, and because she can no longer afford rent, she and her children move in with Novalee and Americus.

Mary Elizabeth eventually dies. When Forney fails to appear at the funeral, Novalee finds him at a hotel and comforts him. They act on their long-suppressed feelings and spend the night together. Forney confesses his love, but Novalee confides in Lexie that she has never considered herself good enough for him and feels conflicted about their relationship. Believing his life would become a dead end if he stayed with her, Novalee lies to Forney, claiming she does not love him, and leaves him heartbroken. Meanwhile, Novalee learns that Lexie is dating Ernie, an exterminator who lacks the physical traits she typically prefers. Lexie falls in love with Ernie after learning that he gave his ex-wife his restored 1967 Chevy Camaro in exchange for full custody of his stepdaughter, whom he officially adopted. The couple marry, and Lexie shares the news that she is pregnant.

Severely depressed over his ruined music career following the lawsuit, Willy Jack succumbs to alcoholism. One night, he wanders off intoxicated and passes out on a railroad track; an oncoming train runs over him, severing both of his legs. On Americus's fifth birthday, Novalee reads a newspaper report detailing Willy Jack's accident. She visits him in the hospital and realizes he has genuinely changed, but she still warns him never to contact Americus.

After driving Willy Jack home to Tennessee, Novalee travels to Bowdoin College in Maine to visit Forney, where she confesses her true feelings for him. The two return to Sequoyah and marry inside the Walmart where it all began, surrounded by their closest friends.

== Cast ==
- Natalie Portman as Novalee Nation, a pregnant teen stranded in Sequoyah
- Ashley Judd as Lexie Coop, a Sequoyah nurse and Novalee's best friend
- Stockard Channing as Thelma "Sister" Husband, a religious woman in a common law marriage, who befriends Novalee
- Joan Cusack as Ruth Meyers, a cranky Santa Fe music agent
- James Frain as Forney Hull, a Sequoyah librarian who loves Novalee
- Dylan Bruno as Willy Jack Pickens, Novalee's ex-boyfriend and Americus' biological father
- Keith David as Moses Whitecotton, a Walmart portrait photographer who trains Novalee in photography
- Dennis Letts as a Sheriff, who arrests Willy Jack for Jolene's heist
- Sally Field as Mama Lil, Novalee's estranged mother
- Angee Hughes as a Religious Woman from Midnight, Mississippi who abducts baby Americus
- Rodger Boyce as Officer Harry
- Richard Nance as Johnny DeSotto, a music agent who meets Willy Jack in Las Vegas
- Cody Linley as Brownie Coop, one of Lexie's children
- Heather Kafka as Delphia

== Production ==
=== Filming ===
Most of the film was shot in various locations in Central Texas, including Lockhart, Taylor, and Georgetown. The scenes at Bowdoin College were shot at Baylor University in Waco.

== Music ==
Original music for the film was produced by Mason Daring.A soundtrack of the original music was released by RCA Records, as well as a music compilation soundtrack featuring songs used in the film by artists such as Emmylou Harris, Lyle Lovett, Martina McBride, and John Hiatt.

The song "That's the Beat of a Heart" was performed by The Warren Brothers and Sara Evans.A music video was made for the song, which is included as a bonus extra on the DVD release.

== Reception ==
=== Critical response ===
The film received mostly negative reviews. Metacritic gives it a score of 30% based on reviews from 28 critics. Rotten Tomatoes gives it a 35% approval rating, based on reviews from 97 critics, with the site's consensus stating that the film's "poor script and messy plot undermines the decent cast."

=== Box office ===
The film opened in theaters in the United States on April 28, 2000. Where the Heart Is accumulated USD $8,292,939 in its opening weekend, opening at number 4 behind U-571, The Flintstones in Viva Rock Vegas and Frequency. It went on to make $33,772,838 at the North American box office, and an additional $7,090,880 internationally for a worldwide total of $40,863,718.
