= Hembrey =

Hembrey is a surname. Notable people with the surname include:

- Randy Hembrey (born 1965), American auto racing executive
- Shea Hembrey (born 1974), American artist

== See also ==
- Hembree
