= Amerigo =

Amerigo may refer to:

== People ==
- Amerigo Anton (1911–1982), alias of Tanio Boccia, Italian film director and screenwriter
- Amerigo (Amico) Aspertini, Italian painter and sculptor
- Amerigo Bartoli Natinguerra (1890–1971), Italian painter, caricaturist, and writer
- Amerigo Cacioni (1908–2005), Italian cyclist
- Amerigo Castrighella (1926–1989), Italian actor
- Amerigo Corsanego, Italian wrestler
- Amerigo Dumini (1894–1967), Italian fascist activist
- Amerigo Gazaway (born 1986), American musician
- Amerigo Paradiso (born 1962), Italian footballer
- Amerigo Petrucci (1922–1983), Italian politician
- Amerigo Salvetti (1572–1657), alias of Alessandro Antelminelli, Italian diplomat, adventurer and conspirator
- Amerigo Sbigoli (died 1822), Italian tenor
- Amerigo Serrao, birth name of Arthur Varney (1893–1960), American screenwriter and film director
- Amerigo Severini (1931–2020), Italian cyclist
- Amerigo Thodé (1950–2023), Curaçaoan politician
- Amerigo Tot (1909–1984), Hungarian sculptor and actor
- Amerigo Vespucci (1454–1512), Italian merchant, explorer and cartographer after whom the American continents were named
- Francisco Javier Amérigo (1842–1912), Spanish painter

== Other uses ==
- Amerigo, a 1978 LP by Italian singer-songwriter Francesco Guccini
- "Amerigo", a song from the 2012 album Banga by Patti Smith
- Amerigo, Sinterklaas's white horse
- Amerigo Bonasera, a fictional character from The Godfather by Mario Puzo
- Prince Amerigo, a fictional character in the 1904 novel The Golden Bowl

== See also ==
- Amalric
- Amaury (disambiguation)
- Arrigo
- Emmerich (disambiguation)
- Imre
