= Aymeric =

Aimeric or Aymeric or Aimery (from Haimirich or Amalric) is a male given name. Notable people with the name include:

- Aymeric Ahmed (born 2003), Comorian footballer
- Aimeric de Belenoi (fl. 1215–1242), Gascon troubadour
- Prince Aymeric of Belgium (born 2005)
- Aymeric Jaubert de Barrault (died 1613), mayor of Bordeaux
- Aymeric Jett Montaz (born 2004), French-Canadian actor
- Aymeric Laporte (born 1994), French footballer who plays for Manchester City F.C. and the Spain national team
- Aimery of Limoges (died c.1196), Latin Patriarch of Antioch
- Aimerico Manrique de Lara, Aimeric or Aymeric, sometimes Gallicised as Aimery (1152–1177), ruler of Narbonne
- Aymeri de Narbonne, legendary hero of France
- Aimery II of Narbonne (died 1134), Viscount of Narbonne
- Aimery III of Narbonne (died 1239), known in Spanish as Aimerico Pérez de Lara, Viscount of Narbonne
- Aimery IV of Narbonne (Amerigo di Narbona) (c.1230 – 1298), Viscount of Narbonne, Italian condottiero
- Ademar de Peiteus (Aimeric de Peiteus), ruler of Diois until 1230
- Adémar II de Poitiers (Aimeric de Peiteus), Count of Valentinois
- Aimeric de Peguilhan (c. 1170 – c. 1230), French troubadour
- Aimeric de Sarlat (fl. c. 1200), French troubadour
- Aimery of Cyprus (died 1205), king of Cyprus and Jerusalem

== See also ==
- Almeric, a given name
