= Bloodsuckers from Outer Space =

- Film poster
- Directed by: Glen Coburn
- Written by: Glen Coburn
- Produced by: Rick Garlington
- Starring: Thom Meyers; Dennis Letts; Laura Ellis; Robert Bradeen; Glen Coburn; Kris Nicolau; Pat Paulsen
- Cinematography: Chad D. Smith
- Edited by: Karen D. Latham
- Music by: Rick Garlington
- Production company: One Of Those Productions
- Distributed by: Karl-Lorimar Home Video
- Release date: October 1984
- Running time: 80 minutes
- Country: United States
- Language: English

Bloodsuckers from Outer Space is a 1984 American comedy horror film written and directed by Glen Coburn. It stars Thom Meyers, Dennis Letts, Laura Ellis, Robert Bradeen, Glen Coburn, Kris Nicolau, and Pat Paulsen as Texas residents who must battle a mist that turns people into zombies.

== Premise ==
Texas farmers turn into zombies when they become infected by an energy field from outer space. The residents must escape before an overeager general can convince the President to drop a nuclear bomb on the rural town.

== Cast ==
- Thom Meyers as Jeff Rhodes
- Dennis Letts as General Sanders
- Laura Ellis as Julie
- Robert Bradeen as Uncle Joe
- Glen Coburn as Ralph Rhodes
- Kris Nicolau as Jeri Jett
- Pat Paulsen as the President

== Release ==
Bloodsuckers from Outer Space premiered at Joe Bob Briggs' Drive-In Movie Festival in October 1984. Star Pat Paulsen attended the premiere and later said that he was embarrassed by the quality. Karl-Lorimar Home Video released it on home video in 1986, and Media Blasters released it on DVD on December 30, 2008.

== Reception ==
Travis Box of the Dallas Observer cited it as one of the best low budget films made in Texas. Mike Phalin of Dread Central rated it 5/5 stars and wrote, "Bloodsuckers From Outer Space could be one of the kings of low budget B-Movies." Academic Peter Dendle wrote in The Zombie Encyclopedia that it "is a lot like the following year's The Return of the Living Dead, except that it isn't funny or exciting."
