= Amauri Torezan =

Brazilian abstract artist (born 1972)

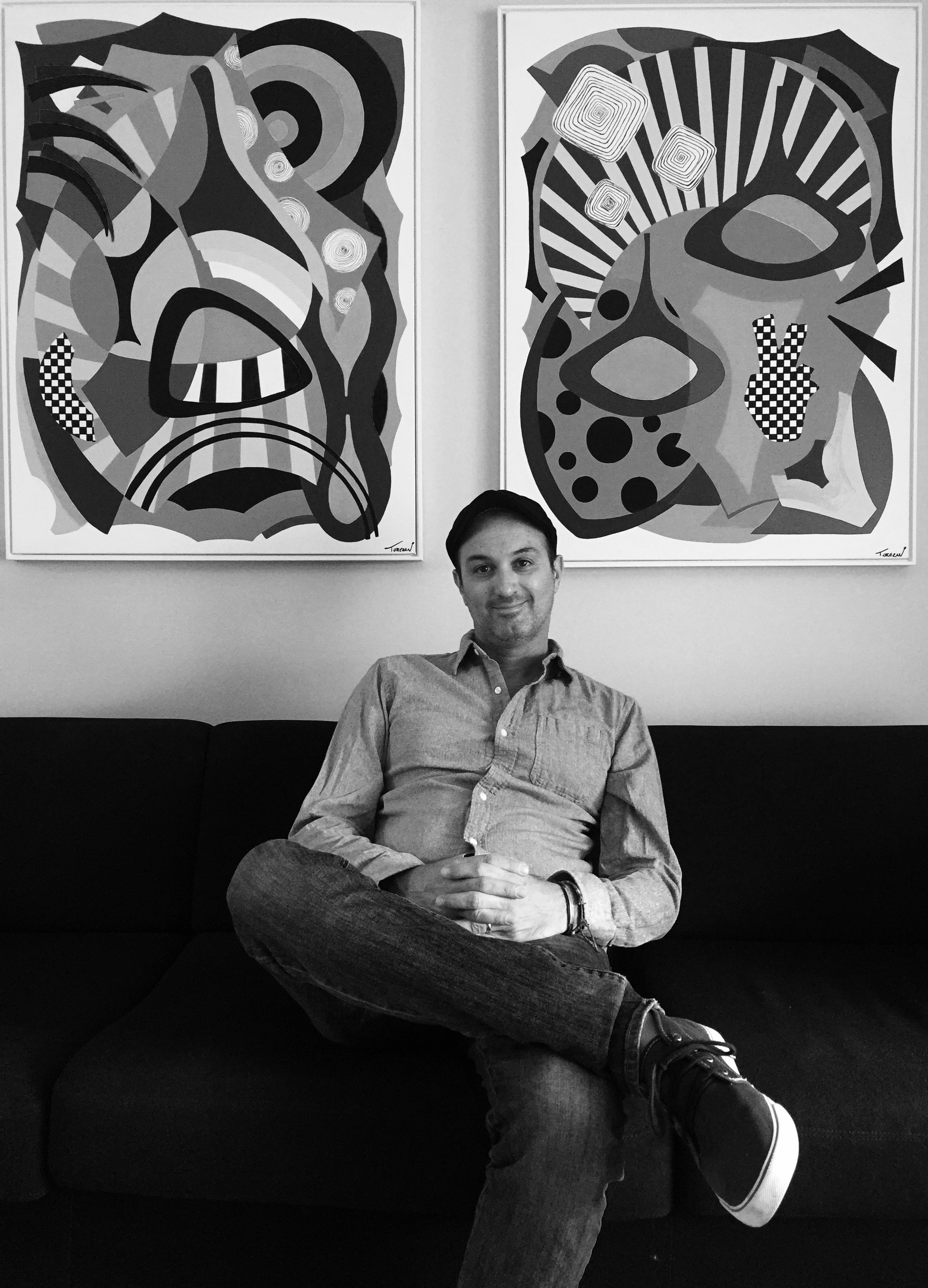
- Born: Amauri Mainardi Torezan; 1972 (age 53–54); São Paulo, Brazil
- Known for: Painting, sculpture, Abstract Art, Contemporary Art, Modern Art, Pop Art
- Style: Hard-Edge Abstract
- Movement: Abstract Art, Contemporary Art, Abstract Expressionism, Pop Art
- Awards: Visual Arts Press Award 2017
- Website: amauritorezanart.com

Amauri Torezan (born 1972) is a Brazilian abstract artist currently living in South Florida. His work is known for its use of geometric abstraction, hard-edge painting, and color-driven visual structures. Torezan has created large-scale murals and public artworks and has exhibited in museums and cultural institutions in the United States.

== Early life ==
Torezan was born in São Paulo, Brazil in 1972, and he began drawing and painting as a child. During the 1980s, he was involved in skateboard culture, which influenced his early creative output through painting decks and graffiti. He later transitioned into surrealist portraiture before focusing on abstract art, influenced by his independent study of 1950s and 1960s modernist abstraction.

== Career ==
Torezan's studio works have been exhibited at The Baker Museum at Artis—Naples, the Coral Springs Museum of Art, and the Cultural Council for Palm Beach County, as well as at international art fairs.

He has created public-art murals in South Florida, including a mural project in West Palm Beach and murals in the Wynwood Arts District and at The Dalmar. His artistic collaborations have included partnerships with brands such as the Swiss watchmaker TAG Heuer, and his art is part of collections in the United States, Europe, and South America.

=== Artistic Style ===
Torezan's practice has been described as rooted in geometric abstraction and hard-edge painting. His work explores relationships between color and form, incorporating elements of geometry and optical illusion in compositions influenced by modernist abstraction and mid-20th-century art movements.

== Selected exhibitions ==
- The Baker Museum, Florida Contemporary
- Coral Springs Museum of Art, Inspire 2016
- Global Code Project
- SaveArtSpace
- Canvas Outdoor Museum 2015 (local showdown)
