= Emicho =

Emicho is a masculine Germanic given name. It may refer to:

- Members of the noble family of the Emichones
- Emicho (crusader), also known as Emicho of Flonheim or Emicho of Leiningen, leader of the Rhineland massacres of Jews in 1096
- Emicho, Count of Württemberg (fl. 1139–1154)
- Emicho, abbot of Mallersdorf Abbey (1143–1157)
- Emicho (bishop of Freising) (died 1311)
- Emicho I, Count of Nassau-Hadamar (died 1334)

== See also ==
- Emich
- Embricho (disambiguation)
