= Imre (surname) =

The surname Imre may refer to:

- Peter Imre (1962–2022), Romanian businessman
- Sándor Imre (1877–1945), Hungarian educator and briefly Minister of Religion and Education of Hungary
- Vilmos Imre (born 1968), Hungarian handball coach and former player

== See also ==
- Imre, a given name
- Emre (surname), a Turkish surname
