= Emre Sabuncuoğlu =

Emre Sabuncuoglu
- Born: Ankara, Turkey
- Genres: Classical
- Instrument: Classical guitar
- Website: emresabuncuoglu.com

Emre Sabuncuoglu (Turkish: [ˈemɾe sabundʒuˈoːɫu]) is a Turkish classical guitarist, arranger, composer and mathematician. He is on the faculty of the Los Angeles Guitar Academy.

== Early years ==
Born in Ankara, Turkey, he attended Ankara Atatürk Anadolu Lisesi where he took guitar lessons from Güneş Apaydın. During high school, he was accepted to Hacettepe University State Conservatory where he studied with the internationally acclaimed Turkish guitarist Ahmet Kanneci. He also studied music theory and composition with Kemal Çağlar.

== Education ==
Emre received a Bachelor of Science degree in Mathematics at Middle East Technical University, specializing in universal algebra and lattice theory. From 1998 to 2000, he worked with the mathematician and composer Andreas Tiefenbach toward his Master of Science degree in Mathematics. During this time, he taught mathematics as a departmental associate, and classical guitar at the METU Classical Guitar Society.

Emre holds a Master of Music degree, magna cum laude, from New England Conservatory of Music in Boston, where he was a student of guitarist and composer David Leisner. He also studied composition with Michael Gandolfi and David Leisner.

In 2006, Emre completed his doctorate (D.M.A., Doctor of Musical Arts) at the University of Southern California, Thornton School of Music as a student of the late Prof. James F. Smith. As an Andrés Segovia Endowed Music Scholarship recipient, he has pursued doctoral minors in the areas of Music Theory, Ethnomusicology and Flamenco Guitar, and has studied performance with the legendary guitarist Pepe Romero.

== Career ==
In February 2005, the Young Guru Academy selected Emre to participate in its inaugural USA Leadership Camp.

Emre is on the faculty of the Los Angeles Guitar Academy (LAGA). Though he no longer actively teaches, he remains a key contributor to LAGA Online in the development of the curriculum and sheet music publications through his arrangements.

== Awards and honors ==
- 2005—Anna H. Bing Music Award, Los Angeles, CA
- 2005—Young Guru Academy Participant, Raleigh, NC
- 2002-2004—Andrés Segovia Endowed Music Scholarship, Los Angeles, CA
- 2000-2002—Dean's List, New England Conservatory of Music, Boston, MA
- 2000-2002—Tuition Scholarship, New England Conservatory of Music, Boston, MA
- 2000—Eczacibasi Foundation Award, Istanbul, Turkey
- 1996—First Prize, Antonio Lauro Classical Guitar Competition, Ankara, Turkey
- 1993—Honorable Mention, Guitares du Saubestre, Pau, France
- 1992—First Prize, Arthez de Bearn International Guitar Competition, Pau, France

== See also ==
- Music of Turkey
