= Dennis Letts =

American actor

- Born: September 5, 1934; Oklahoma City, Oklahoma, U.S.
- Died: February 22, 2008 (aged 73); Tulsa, Oklahoma, U.S.
- Occupations: Educator; actor
- Years active: 1984–2008 (actor)
- Spouse: Billie Gipson (m. 1958)
- Children: 3; including Tracy

Dennis Letts (September 5, 1934 – February 22, 2008) was an American college professor, and later, in a second career, an actor. As the latter, he originated the critically successful role of Beverly Weston in the Steppenwolf Theatre Company production of the Tony-winning play August: Osage County in the summer of 2007, the writing of which had earned his son, Tracy Letts, a Pulitzer Prize.

== Early life ==
Letts was born in Oklahoma City on September 5, 1934. He graduated from Wagoner High School in 1952. He enlisted in the United States Air Force after graduation, where he served until 1956.

Letts received his bachelor's degree from Northeastern State University in Tahlequah, Oklahoma, thanks to the G.I. Bill. He went on to earn his master's degree from the University of Tulsa and his doctorate from the University of Illinois Urbana-Champaign. He also earned a Fulbright Scholarship.

Letts married his wife, novelist Billie Gipson, in 1958; the couple had three sons: Dana, Tracy (a playwright), and Shawn (a jazz musician/composer).

== Career ==
Letts spent much of his professional career as a writing and English professor. He taught for more than thirty years, mostly as a faculty member at Southeastern Oklahoma State University in Durant, Oklahoma.

Letts first began acting at the relatively late age of 50 years. Letts first started performing at university and community theaters while still working as a college professor. He began acting as a full second career after retiring from teaching. Letts appeared in more than 40 films and television shows over the course of his career, including parts in high-profile films such as Cast Away in 2000.

His acting credits also included his debut in Bloodsuckers from Outer Space, a science fiction comedy film written and directed by Glen Coburn, Where the Heart Is, a film based on a novel written by his wife, Billie Letts. He served as an editor for his wife's novels, which won various literary awards and have appeared on The New York Times Best Seller list.

=== August: Osage County ===
Letts premiered the role of Beverly Weston in the original production of August: Osage County, which was written by his son, Tracy Letts. His character is described as an "Oklahoma patriarch" whose mysterious disappearance reunites his dysfunctional family. August: Osage County first opened at the Steppenwolf Theatre Company in the summer of 2007. The show, as well as Letts's performance, was a critical success.

== Illness and death ==
Letts was diagnosed with lung cancer in September 2007. Despite his diagnosis, he chose to remain with the August: Osage County production as the show moved to New York City. The show, with Letts as a full cast member, debuted on Broadway in December 2007. It earned some of the best critical reviews of that season. He continued performing eight shows a week of August: Osage County in New York City until February 2008. He kept up his schedule despite his illness and its treatment. Letts died in Tulsa, Oklahoma, on February 22, 2008, at the age of 73. A memorial service was held in Wagoner, Oklahoma. He was survived by his wife, Billie (died 2014), and sons, Tracy, Dana and Shawn.

== Filmography ==
Year	Title	Role	Notes
1984	Bloodsuckers from Outer Space	General Sanders	
1985	Tabloid		
1987	Square Dance	Bob Hadley	
1988	Johnny Be Good	Army General	
1988	It Takes Two	Bus Clerk	
1988	Heartbreak Hotel	Alan Fortas	
1991	The Man in the Moon	Doc White	
1991	Rush	Senior District Attorney	
1992	Passenger 57	Frank Allen	
1992	Sidekicks	Man with Dog	
1993	A Perfect World	Governor	
1995	Gordy	Governor	
1995	Frank and Jesse	Railroad C.E.O.	
1997	Keys to Tulsa	Preston Liddy	
1997	Little Boy Blue	Sgt. Phillips	
1997	Fire Down Below	Doctor Schultz	
2000	Where the Heart Is	Sheriff	
2000	Cast Away	Dennis Larson	
2003	Secondhand Lions	Sheriff	
2004	Christmas Child	Judge	
2006	Infamous	Judge Tate	(final film role)
