= Mason Daring =

American musician and composer

- Born: Mason K. Daring; September 21, 1949; Philadelphia
- Occupations: American musician and composer
- Instrument: guitar
- Labels: Daring, Harbor, Philo, Varèse Sarabande, Columbia, Sony Music Soundtrax, Miramax Film Corp., RCA Victor, BMG Classics, 20th Century Fox

Mason K. Daring (born September 21, 1949, in Philadelphia, Pennsylvania) is an American musician and composer of scores for film and television. He has worked on nearly all the films directed by John Sayles, adapting his style to fit whatever period in which the film is set.

== Biography ==
Daring began his music studies in fourth grade, playing trumpet, which he played in school bands on through to Amherst College, where he majored in music and graduated cum laude in 1971. He began playing guitar in seventh grade and formed a rock band called The Squires the following year. After college, he played and recorded with bands around the East Coast, taught university courses and continued his studies in music and law.

He earned a J.D. degree from Suffolk Law School in 1976 and passed the Massachusetts bar in 1977. He also continued working in music, and gained experience as a film editor and director of television commercials.

Through his career in entertainment law, he became acquainted with John Sayles. While Daring was serving as legal counsel for the director's first film, Return of the Secaucus 7, Sayles had heard some of Daring's music and asked the lawyer to compose the film score.

Since then, Daring has worked full-time as a composer, mostly on films by Sayles, but also for other films and for television. He also maintains his own record label, Daring Records (a subsidiary of Rounder Records). He lives in Marblehead, Massachusetts and Santa Monica, California.

== Discography ==
Solo

- Lianna (Original Soundtrack) (Daring, 1983)
- Dawn At Josiah's Bay - The Surf And Birds Of A Caribbean Morning (Daring, 1987)
- Matewan (Original Soundtrack) (Daring, 1987)
- Eight Men Out (Original Soundtrack) (Varèse Sarabande, 1988)
- The Secret of Roan Inish (Original Soundtrack) (Daring, 1995)
- The Old Curiosity Shop (Daring, 1995)
- The Great War and the Shaping of the 20th Century (Original Soundtrack) (Daring, 1996)
- The Opposite of Sex (Original Film Score) (Daring, 1998)
- Limbo (Music From The Motion Picture) (Columbia, Sony Music Soundtrax, 1999)
- Music of the Heart (Miramax Film Corp., 1999)
- Where the Heart Is (Music From The Original Soundtrack) (RCA Victor, BMG Classics, 20th Century Fox, 2000)
- Sunshine State (Original Soundtrack From The Motion Picture) (Daring, 2002)

With Jeanie Stahl

- Sweet Melodies In The Night (Harbor, 1978)
- Heartbreak (Philo, 1980)
