= Nicole Henry Fine Art =

- Founded: 2006

Nicole Henry Fine Art is a West Palm Beach gallery specializing in emerging art markets including Cuban and Street Art to secondary works from Pre-Columbian, Old Masters, Impressionists, Modern, Contemporary, Latin American, European, and American Art. The Gallery was founded by art dealer Nicole Henry in 2006.

== Biography of founder ==
After graduating from Southern Methodist University in Dallas, TX with a BFA in Art History and Studio Art, Nicole Henry was granted a treasury license from the U.S. government in 2001 to travel to Cuba and bring back Cuban Art. After amassing a large Cuban Collection, Henry opened her first Art Gallery in 2006 in Palm Beach Gardens, FL. In 2011, she moved her gallery to West Palm Beach where she still operates today.

== Exhibitions and group shows ==
- 2006: Nina Surel, Edouard Duval Carrie, Ismael Gomez-Peralta Group Show
- 2007: Exhibited in Art Miami
- 2007: Group show, Nantucket, MA important American Painters
- 2008: Contemporary Cuban Artists
- 2008: Latin American Masters
- 2009: Group Show Contemporary and Latin American
- 2009: PGA Tour Wives Show
- 2009: Group Show Nina Surel and Carlos Jorge
- 2010: Group Show Contemporary and Modern Paintings
- 2010: PGA Tour Wives Show
- 2010: Nina Surel and Edouard Duval Carrie
- 2011: PGA Tour Wives Show
- 2011: Cuban and Contemporary painters
- 2012: Contemporary Art Group Show
- 2012: PGA Tour Wives Show Romero Britto
- 2013: Solo show for Max Zorn
- 2013: Jacob Felländer Solo show
- 2014: Contemporary Art Group Show
- 2015: Cuban and Contemporary Art Group Show
- 2015: Group Show for CANVAS Outdoor Museum Show Artists
- 2015: 1 Hotels South Beach Rooftop Mural Installation by Zeus and works by Jeremy Penn and Registered Artist, Art Basel Miami Beach
- 2016: Bruce Helander Solo Show
- 2016: The Hula (Sean Yoro) Solo Show

== See also ==
- West Palm Beach
- Palm Beach County
- Florida
- South Florida
