= Emrich =

Emrich is a surname. Notable people with the surname include:

- Alan Emrich, American writer about and designer of computer games
- Armin Emrich (born 1951), German handball player
- Brian Emrich (born 1961), sound designer, composer, and musician
- Clyde Emrich (1931–2021), American weightlifter
- Daniel Emrich, member of the Montana Senate
- Fritz Emrich (1894–1947), German politician
