= Amick =

Amick is both a surname and a given name. Notable people with the name include:

Surname:

- Bill Amick (1925–1995), American NASCAR driver
- Billy Amick (born 2002), American baseball player
- Eugene Earle Amick (1919–1942), United States Navy officer
- George Amick (1924–1959), American racecar driver
- Lyndon Amick (born 1977), American NASCAR driver
- Mädchen Amick (born 1970), American actress
- Red Amick (1929–1995), American racecar driver

Given name

- Amick Byram (born 1955), American Gospel singer and tenor

== See also ==
- USS Amick (DE-168), a United States Navy destroyer escort of World War II
- Aimak people of Afghanistan
