= Peter Emmerich =

American cartoonist

- Born: Peter James Emmerich; November 5, 1973; Brooklyn, New York City, New York
- Known for: Penciler; Cartoonist; Illustrator

Peter Emmerich (born November 5, 1973) is an illustrator employed by The Walt Disney Co.

== Early life and career ==
Born in New York City, and raised in Brooklyn, Peter Emmerich attended Xaverian High School, and went on to pursue postsecondary education at The Fashion Institute of Technology. Upon graduation, he began his career with The Walt Disney Co as a character artist for Walt Disney Consumer Products. He worked there for over two years before being promoted to Chief Illustrator and Official Character Artist for the Disneyland Resort. While he was there, he created many collector lithographs, including Disneyland's 45th Anniversary "Character of the Month" series. In 2001, he created "Mickey Salutes America," with the poster publisher Bruce Mcgaw Graphics, Inc. in Nyack, New York.

After the success of "Mickey Salutes America," Emmerich created a series of postage stamps for the United States Postal Service, highlighting images and characters from famous Disney films. The series of twelve stamps included three sections titled "The Art of Disney: Friendship", "The Art of Disney: Celebration", and "The Art of Disney: Romance". These stamps featured many Disney characters, including Mickey Mouse, Donald Duck, Goofy, and Cinderella.

Emmerich has taught at The Pratt Institute and currently teaches at The Fashion Institute of Technology.
