= Where the Heart Is (novel) =

Book by Billie Letts

- Author: Billie Letts
- Language: English
- Publisher: Sceptre
- Publication date: August 17, 1995
- Publication place: United States
- Media type: Print (hardback & paperback)
- Pages: 368 p. (paperback edition)
- ISBN: 0-340-64698-5 (paperback edition)
- OCLC: 34544702

Where the Heart Is is a 1995 novel by author Billie Letts. It was chosen as an Oprah's Book Club selection in December 1998, and was adapted into a 2000 film by the same name.

The novel is about Novalee Nation, a pregnant and destitute teenager deserted by her boyfriend in a Walmart store in Sequoyah, Oklahoma. There, she forges friendships with a group of eccentric but loving people.

== Plot summary ==
The novel opens with seventeen-year-old Novalee Nation, and her boyfriend Willy Jack, traveling from Tennessee to California, where Willy Jack claims he was promised by his cousin, J. Paul, a job working at a trainyard. Novalee is seven months pregnant, and superstitious about sevens after a series of misfortunes over the course of her life: at the age of 7, her mother ran off with a baseball umpire named Fred, her best friend in seventh grade was arrested, and a crazy customer at her café job cut her from wrist to elbow, a wound which took 77 stitches to close up. Meanwhile, Willy Jack is hiding from Novalee his plan to lose a finger at the trainyard so that he can win a cash settlement, like his cousin did, and not have to work again.

Novalee makes Willy Jack place his hand on her stomach so that he can feel the baby's heartbeat - Willy Jack insists he feels nothing, and continues to treat Novalee and her pregnancy with annoyed indifference. Novalee convinces Willy Jack to stop at a Walmart in Sequoyah, Oklahoma, so she can use the restroom and purchase a pair of sandals, as hers fell through the rusted floor of their beat-up Plymouth. When Novalee comes out of the Walmart, she realizes Willy Jack has left her with nothing more than her beach bag and the $7.77 in change.

With nowhere else to go, Novalee spends the afternoon at the Walmart and meets Sister Thelma Husband, a kind, spunky, and deeply religious older woman who runs the town's Welcome Wagon, and hands out chapters of the Bible to people she meets. Sister Husband initially "mistakes" Novalee for a girl named Ruth Ann Mott, gives Novalee a Welcome Wagon basket, and invites her to come visit her whenever she likes. Novalee also meets Moses Whitecotton, a photographer who shoots portraits at the Walmart. Moses tells Novalee to give her baby a name "that will mean something" and "withstand a lot of bad times," and gifts her a photo album. Finally, she meets Benny Goodluck, a Native American boy who gives Novalee a buckeye tree for good luck. When the Walmart closes, Novalee initially panics as she is trapped inside of the store, but, as it provides her with temporary shelter, takes refuge there.

Meanwhile, Willy Jack continues on his way to California, but quickly runs out of money and gas. He stops at a local dive bar and meets Jolene, the bar owner's teenage daughter. Willy Jack convinces Jolene that he's a musician on his way to Las Vegas who had his wallet and license stolen - she agrees to use her own money to fix up his car, on the condition that he takes her to Vegas with him. Upon their departure, they're almost immediately pulled over by the police, who suspect Willy Jack of being responsible for a theft at a nearby convenience store. The police find fourteen cartons of stolen cigarettes in the trunk of his car. When Willy Jack protests, Jolene, who had committed the theft, but is friendly with the police, further accuses him to cover herself. He is subsequently arrested and sent to jail.

As Novalee continues to live in Walmart, she watches as the buckeye tree becomes sick. She takes a walk to the library where she meets Forney Hull, who helps her find books about the buckeye. Forney is from a well-bred family, originally from New England, but had to drop out of college to take care of his alcoholic sister, the librarian. Forney comes off as eccentric and standoffish, but agrees to help Novalee as she shows a burgeoning fascination for books and learning. Novalee learns what she needs in order to save her buckeye tree, and takes a walk to Sister Husband's home to ask permission to plant her buckeye on her property, to which Sister agrees.

As the weeks pass, Novalee becomes good friends with Forney, Sister Husband, and Sister's companion Mr. Sprock. Forney, who is beginning to fall in love with Novalee, throws her an intimate 18th birthday party in the library, consisting of gourmet dishes he's cooked himself. The celebration is cut short when Forney's alcoholic sister, Mary Elizabeth, takes a fall upstairs, and Forney is forced to come to her aid.

Two months after she'd been abandoned, Novalee goes into labor in the middle of the night inside of the closed Walmart. She tries to choose a name for her baby before it comes, but the pain of her labor quickly overtakes her. Forney, who had become only recently aware that she had been living in the store, breaks a window and helps her give birth. After she delivers a baby girl, she recalls Moses Whitecotton's advice on picking a strong name for her child, and names her Americus.

At the hospital, she befriends her nurse, Lexi Coop, who has four children with three different fathers. Novalee soon finds out that she and her baby are famous and in the news, and begins receiving letters and money from strangers in the mail. Sam Walton, the patriarch of the Walton family and owner of the Walmart corporation, comes in to visit Novalee and offer her a job at the store where she gave birth, which Novalee accepts after some hesitation about people's reactions to her. Novalee's mother, Momma Nell, finds out from the television report what had happened and which hospital Novalee is convalescing in, and arrives ostensibly to offer her support. Novalee is hesitantly grateful to accept the help and hands over the money she'd received from Sam Walton and her supporters so that her mother can buy what they need for the baby. But the next morning, when Momma Nell doesn't return, Novalee fully accepts that her mother and the money are gone for good.

Sister Husband eventually collects Novalee and Americus after they're discharged and moves them into the trailer in which she lives. After some adjusting, Novalee starts work in the Walmart where she used to live, and is relieved that gossip about her is short-lived. Sister eventually becomes a mother figure to Novalee and her daughter, and Novalee's relationships with Moses Whitecotton, Lexi Coop, and Forney Hull are deepened as she becomes a staple figure in Sequoyah. Lexi serves as the first real girlfriend that Novalee has ever had and provides advice and support, while Moses mentors Novalee in photography, and Forney brings her books to support her growing love of reading and learning. The community is brought together to rally around Novalee when baby Americus, at seven months old, is abducted by a religious couple who baptize her. Americus is safely returned and the couple is arrested by the police.

Meanwhile, in prison, Willy Jack suffers at the hands of inmates and guards alike. After suffering a blow to his chest, his heart stops in the middle of the night - while he struggles to restart it, he hears Novalee's voice guiding him to the heartbeat of their unborn baby. He recovers from the ordeal, but is often thereafter plagued by Novalee's voice, especially when he sleeps. He later manages to charm Claire Hudson, the solemn prison librarian mourning her dead son Finny, and uses her grief to his advantage. She eventually gives him Finny's guitar, a Martin. He teaches himself to play and soon writes a song, "The Beat of a Heart."

Three years later, Novalee continues to study photography alongside Moses Whitecotton, and soon begins to take classes in photography at the local college. She maintains strong friendships with Lexi Coop and Forney Hull, who has taken a sort of fatherly role with Americus as a teacher and mentor. Americus thrives under the care of Novalee, Sister, and Forney, and develops into a precocious child with a deep love of learning. Lexi gently teases Novalee about her relationship with Forney, which Novalee insists is platonic despite growing evidence to the contrary.

During the summer, a massive storm brews in Oklahoma, sending residents scrambling for shelter. Novalee and Americus manage to make it to their storm shelter in time, but Sister Husband, who was visiting a neighbor, is trapped in the trailer by the ensuing tornado. The trailer is destroyed, and to Novalee's tremendous grief, Sister passes away from her injuries several days later in the hospital. The damage from the tornado includes the Walmart, which is leveled to the ground. During her bereavement, Novalee and Americus move in temporarily with Moses and his wife, Certain. Beyond grieving the loss of Sister, Novalee struggles with the choice of whether to stay in Sequoyah with her family, or to move fifty miles away to Poteau, where the decimated Walmart is being rebuilt in order to keep her job and health insurance. But to her great surprise, Novalee learns that Sister left her all of her possessions, property insurance, and life insurance. She decides to remain in Sequoyah and commute to Poteau, and with the insurance money she receives, is able to build a house right where Sister's trailer used to be, and where her buckeye tree is miraculously still standing.

Willy Jack is released from prison after a three-year sentence, during which time he became a talented musician. With Claire Hudson's money and help, he makes his way to Nashville to find an agent, but is quickly dismissed from every reputable agency. He eventually becomes desperate as his money runs out, but finds representation from Ruth Meyers, a no-nonsense agent who agrees to take him on under the condition that he never lie to her. She uses every resource at her disposal to clean up Willy Jack, and gives him the alias "Billy Shadow." Billy Shadow's star rises slowly and steadily, but his only real success is in "The Beat of a Heart," which becomes a hit after it's recorded by another musician. Willy Jack quickly grows frustrated at what he feels is Ruth Meyer's lack of clout, and tries to go behind her back to find a better agent. But Ruth, who has far more clout and connections than Willy Jack realizes, soon finds out about the plot, disbands his group, cancels his cards and gigs, and effectively ends his career.

Novalee continues to struggle with her feelings for Forney, who has become a daily positive presence in her and Americus' life. Lexi, who is pregnant with her fifth child, points out that Forney has been in love with Novalee for years, but Novalee firmly believes that Forney, who is well-educated and born from wealth, deserves someone better than her. Lexi eventually gives birth to her fifth child, and soon after begins dating a handsome and charming banker named Roger Briscoe. The relationship is short-lived after Roger beats Lexi to within an inch of her life after Lexi discovers him sexually assaulting Brownie (Brummett), her oldest son. Brownie calls Novalee for help, and she rushes to the apartment to discover Lexi beaten and bruised on the bed. As Lexi recovers in the hospital, Novalee moves the Coop family into her tiny house, and cares for the children with the help of her neighbors and Mr. Sprock. Lexi is soon released, but she and Brownie become distant and withdrawn as a result of their trauma, and Lexi's guilt over allowing Roger to target her children.

Forney's sister Mary Elizabeth soon dies in a fire that burns down Hull Manor and the library. Novalee goes to visit him and offer her support, and they end up making love before Forney leaves for Maine to bury his sister. After Forney leaves, Novalee fully accepts that she loves him, but shows trepidation when Lexi congratulates her. Novalee's doubts about her self-worth manifest when Forney returns home to the news that the rebuilt library will be headed by someone else, leaving him without a home or job. Faced with the prospect of Forney working at a plastics plant, a job Novalee believes is beneath him, she deliberately breaks his heart by telling him she doesn't love him, so that he no longer has any ties to Oklahoma. Forney, heartbroken, leaves Oklahoma and Novalee behind.

Over the following few months, Forney sends letters intermittently to Americus, who is equally heartbroken with his departure, with little to no mention of Novalee beyond cursory formalities. Novalee struggles to get over Forney and her guilt at sending him away, justifying her decision with the fact that Forney has more opportunities at a better life without her. Lexi berates Novalee for undervaluing herself, and Novalee makes a single attempt to reconnect with him after she finds the bookstore in Chicago where he now works, but cannot bring herself to tell him the truth. Lexi, meanwhile, befriends a coworker, Leon Yoder after she recovers enough to return to her job. Though she is initially adamant that she does not want a relationship because of her previous experience, he demonstrates tremendous kindness to her and her children. After Lexi learns the story of how one of his two children isn't, in fact, his, but a child he saved from his ex-girlfriend, the mother of his biological child, Lexi falls in love with him and they eventually marry, with Novalee photographing their wedding day.

Willy Jack manages to make his way to California after losing his career and spiraling heavily into drugs and alcohol. After failing to get any money from his cousin in Bakersfield, he pawns the Martin, his last possession, in a desperate bid for money. The deal falls through, and Willy Jack is left without his guitar or a penny to his name. He finally drunkenly ditches his current girlfriend and staggers into a nearby trainyard where he falls down across the tracks. Both of his legs are severed at the knee by an oncoming train he failed to notice in his stupor. The last thing he remembers is Novalee's voice.

Americus turns seven years old, and Novalee remains superstitious about sevens and vigilant about what she senses coming. She soon catches, by chance, Willy Jack's name in the newspaper not long after her daughter's birthday, which reported that his wheelchair had been stolen while he was hitchhiking to Oklahoma to find his child. Novalee makes arrangements for her daughter, and makes her way to Alva, where Willy Jack is convalescing. She confronts Willy Jack in his hospital room and demands to know why he was trying to find her. Willy Jack confesses to Novalee that he did feel the baby's heartbeat the last day that they were together, and that he periodically called her home from time to time to hear Americus's voice. When Novalee asks him why he lied about the baby's heartbeat, Willy Jack, in a rare moment of self-reflection, tells her that he doesn't have a good reason to lie, but does it anyway, and out of all the lies he's ever told, that one was the only one to cause him guilt. He remarks that people sometimes tell a lie so big that it eats away a part of them, and that, if given a second chance, most people would do anything to set that lie straight. Novalee realizes that the lie she has told that has changed her life is telling Forney that she didn't love him. Once Willy Jack is released, Novalee makes plans to take him back home to Tennessee, but first, she finally calls Forney and tearfully confesses to him that she lied about loving him and that she thought he deserved someone better. Forney assures her that there is nothing better than she is.

Willy Jack is loaded up into Novalee's car as she prepares to take him home, but she decides to wait out a sudden storm before heading underway. While she waits out the rain, she reflects on her life and the connections she'd made since being abandoned at the Walmart, and the home and happiness she'd created in the seven years since.

== Reception ==
Library Journal called Where the Heart Is "an impressive first novel", commending Billie Letts' "deft touch with language and dialog". The review went on to say, "Her well-developed, engaging characters brim with vitality and humanity".

== Adaptations ==
A 2000 film of the same name was directed by Matt Williams, starring Natalie Portman, Ashley Judd, Stockard Channing, and Joan Cusack with supporting roles done by James Frain, Dylan Bruno, Keith David, and Sally Field.

== See also ==
- 2000 in film
