= Emre Miyasoğlu =

Turkish writer (born 1981)

Emre Miyasoğlu (born 26 October 1981 in Istanbul) is a Turkish writer.

== Background ==
He has been in Islamabad, Pakistan, between 1988–1992 and completed his primary school there. His father Mustafa Miyasoğlu (litterateur, novelist and journalist) was a lecturer in the Turkish Literature faculty in Islamabad. He took his junior high education in Istanbul Adnan Menderes Anatolian High School. After taking license from Anatolian University, School of Business Administration Faculty he is still continuing his master study in Classic Turkish Literature.

== Career ==
His narratives, essays, drama and book critiques and translated works have been published in various literary magazines and especially in the newspaper Milli Gazete. In 2003 his first story book Olmaz Hayal (Impossible Fancy) and in 2006 his first novel Yalnızlık Rüyası (Solitude Dream) were published.

The author has also translated Edith Nesbit's The Railway Children, and prepared a story anthology of Edgar Allan Poe in Turkish. He has also translated the autobiography of the Indian national hero Mahatma Gandhi (Autobiography of Mahatma Gandhi: The Story of My Experiments With Truth). He has also written studies of Turkish classic novels.

== List of works ==
=== Short stories ===
"Olmaz Hayal" (Impossible Fancy) (2003)

=== Novels ===
"Yalnızlık Rüyası" (Solitude Dream) (2006)
