= Gilles Emery =

Swiss Dominican theologian and professor (born 1962)

The Reverend Gilles Emery OP
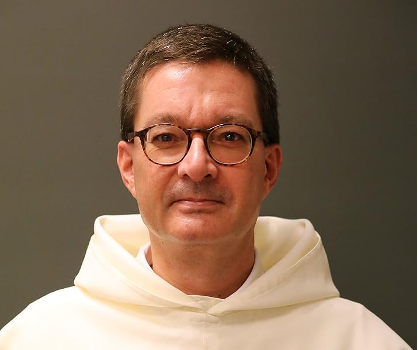
- Born: April 14, 1962 (age 64); Sierre, Valais, Switzerland
- Citizenship: Switzerland
- Education: University of Fribourg
- Occupations: Theologian; Catholic priest; professor
- Notable work: The Trinitarian Theology of St Thomas Aquinas (2007); The Trinity: An Introduction to Catholic Doctrine on the Triune God (2011)
- Awards: Premio Internazionale San Tommaso d'Aquino (2017); Doctor honoris causa, Pontifical University of St Thomas Aquinas (2024)

Gilles Emery, OP (born 14 April 1962) is a Swiss Dominican priest, theologian and professor emeritus of dogmatic theology at the University of Fribourg. A specialist in the theology of Thomas Aquinas and in Trinitarian theology, he served as a member of the International Theological Commission from 2004 to 2014. He is an ordinary member of the Pontifical Academy of Saint Thomas Aquinas.

== Early life and education ==
Emery was born in Sierre, in the canton of Valais, on 14 April 1962. He pursued theological studies at the University of Fribourg, where he completed advanced degrees, including the doctorate in theology in 1994 under the supervision of Jean-Pierre Torrell, O.P. He made his solemn profession in the Order of Preachers and was ordained a priest in 1989.

== Academic career ==
After obtaining the habilitation in 1995, Emery taught dogmatic theology at Fribourg, becoming an ordinary professor in 1997 and serving until his early retirement in 2021; he is professor emeritus. His areas of teaching and research include Trinitarian theology, the theology of creation, and Thomistic theology.

From 2004 to 2014 he was a member of the International Theological Commission, and he is an ordinary member of the Pontifical Academy of Saint Thomas Aquinas.

Emery has also served in editorial roles, including chief editor of the Swiss French edition of the journal Nova et Vetera from 2012, and associate editor of the English-language Nova et Vetera edition (as indicated in issue credits).

Emery's monograph The Trinitarian Theology of St Thomas Aquinas (2007) and his introductory text The Trinity (2011) are frequently cited in contemporary Thomistic and Trinitarian studies, as reflected in reviews and academic indexing.

== Honours ==
- Magister in sacra theologia (2012).
- Premio Internazionale San Tommaso d'Aquino (2017).
- Doctor honoris causa, Faculty of Theology, Pontifical University of St Thomas Aquinas (Angelicum), 7 March 2024.

== Selected publications ==
=== Monographs ===
- La Trinité créatrice: Trinité et création dans les commentaires aux Sentences de Thomas d'Aquin et de ses précurseurs Albert le Grand et Bonaventure (Paris: Vrin, 1995).
- Thomas d'Aquin, Traités: Les raisons de la foi; Les articles de la foi et les sacrements de l'Église (Paris: Cerf, 1999).
- Trinity in Aquinas (Ypsilanti/Naples, FL: Sapientia Press, 2003/2006).
- The Trinitarian Theology of St Thomas Aquinas (Oxford: Oxford University Press, 2007).
- Trinity, Church, and the Human Person: Thomistic Essays (Naples, FL: Sapientia Press, 2007).
- The Trinity: An Introduction to Catholic Doctrine on the Triune God (Washington, D.C.: The Catholic University of America Press, 2011).
- Présence de Dieu et union à Dieu (Paris: Parole et Silence, 2017).

=== Edited volumes ===
- (ed., with Matthew Levering) The Oxford Handbook of the Trinity (Oxford: Oxford University Press, 2011).
- (ed., with Matthew Levering) Aristotle in Aquinas's Theology (Oxford: Oxford University Press, 2015).

=== Selected articles (English) ===
- "Theologia and Dispensatio: The Centrality of the Divine Missions in St. Thomas's Trinitarian Theology," The Thomist 74 (2010): 515–561.
- "Kenosis, Christ, and the Trinity in Thomas Aquinas," Nova et Vetera (English ed.) 17 (2019): 839–869.

== Memberships and editorial work ==
Emery has been associated with Nova et Vetera in both its French and English editions, serving as chief editor of the Swiss French edition from 2012 and as an associate editor for the English edition. He is a member of the Pontifical Academy of Saint Thomas Aquinas, and previously served on the International Theological Commission (2004–2014).

== Personal life ==
Emery is a priest of the Order of Preachers.
