= Imre Trencsényi-Waldapfel =

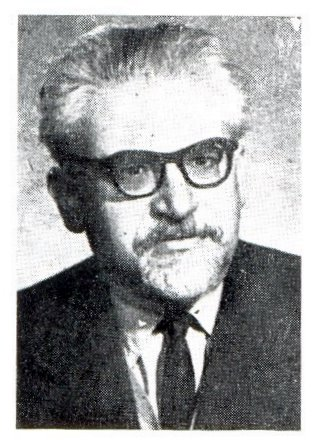
- Imre Trencsényi-Waldapfel
- Born: 16 June 1908; Budapest, Austria-Hungary
- Died: 16 June 1970 (aged 62); Budapest, Hungary
- Occupation(s): Hungarian historian and classical scholar

Imre Trencsényi-Waldapfel (16 June 1908 – 3 June 1970) was a Hungarian classical scholar and member of the Hungarian Academy of Sciences.

Trencsényi-Waldapfel studied the history of religion, philosophy, and epics. He was a specialist in ancient mythology including the Danae-myth, Golden Age myths, the Hesiodic prooemia, the Homeric epics of Central Asia, particularly the Kazakh epics and the Christopher legend. His scholarship combined Greek, Latin and Oriental sources together with fine art to tell the story.

== Selected publications ==
- Erasmus és magyar barátai, Officina, Budapest, 1941.
- Humanizmus és nemzeti irodalom, Akadémiai Kiadó, Budapest, 1966.
- Mitológia, Gondolat, Budapest, 1968.
