= Almeric =

Almeric is a given name. People with the name include:

- Almeric L. Christian (1919–1999), judge of the District Court of the Virgin Islands
- Almeric FitzRoy (1851–1935), British civil servant
- Almeric Paget, 1st Baron Queenborough (1861–1949), British industrialist and Conservative Party politician
- Almeric de Courcy, 23rd Baron Kingsale (1664–1720) was an Irish Jacobite

== See also ==
- Almeric Paget Massage Corps, British physiotherapy service during the First World War
- Almeric, crater on the Saturnian moon Iapetus
- Amalric, a given name
- Aymeric, a given name
