= Emre Korkmaz =

Turkish actor

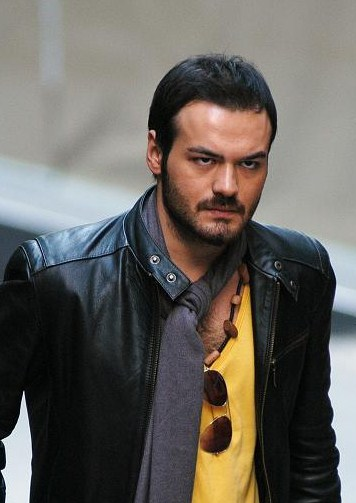
- Born: June 19, 1986 (age 39)
- Occupation: Actor
- Years active: 2004

Emre Korkmaz (born 19 June 1986, in Istanbul) is a Turkish actor.

== Biography ==
Emre Korkmaz started at acting in theatre at the age of 16. Korkmaz graduated in Tourism and Hotel Management from Kocaeli University and Business Management from Eskisehir Anatolian University. Korkmaz who had begun studying acting at the Şahika Tekand acting studio (The Studio Players). He began working at Hadi Çaman's Yeditepe Theatre. He continues to work under with Theatre Lir.

== Filmography ==
=== Television ===
- Muhteşem Yüzyıl Kösem : Mert Baykal - (Sipahi) - 2016
- Paramparça : Deniz Çelebi - (Kenan Şimşir) - 2016
- Evli ve Öfkeli : Nisan Akman - (Harun) - 2015
- Cin Kuyusu : Murat Toktamışoğlu - (Cemil) - 2015
- Deliha : Hakan Algül - (Barmen) - 2014
- Kızıl Elma : Raşit Çelikezer - (Nedim) - 2014
- Vicdan : Feride Kaytan - (Mustafa) - 2013
- Osmanlı Tokadı : Hakan Gürtop - 2013
- Evlilik Okulu : Uğur Yağcıoğlu - (Fikri) - 2013
- İbreti Ailem : Ömer Uğur - (Taksici) - 2012
- At Tutulması : Feride Kaytan - 2011
- Sakarya Fırat : Emre Kabakuşak - (Hamit) - 2011
- Karakol : Onur Tan - (Altan Yetişir) - 2011
- Öyle Bir Geçer Zaman ki : Zeynep Günay Tan - 2011
- Yerden Yüksek : Taner Akvardar - (Tren Osman) - 2010
- Umut Yolcuları : Ümmü Burhan - (Haydar) - 2010
- Küçük Sırlar : Kerem Çakıroğlu - (Sertan) - 2010
- Kanıt : Cem Sürücü - (İsmail) - 2010
- Akasya Durağı : Yaşar Seriner - (Bekir) - 2010 - 2011
- Arka Sokaklar : Orhan Oğuz - (Uzay/Ercan/Reşit) - 2008 - 2010 - 2012
- Kollama : Cem Akyoldaş - (Selman Gündüz) - 2009
- Ölümsüz Kahramanlar : Fatih Derin - (Alper Güvlü/Sinan Demirbaş) - 2008 - 2009
- HG : (Kenan Kara) - 2008
- Hatırla Sevgili : Ümmü Burhan - (Cihan Alptekin) - 2008
- Kurtlar Vadisi Terör : Sadullah Şentürk (Alper) - 2007
- Uğursuz Para : - (Cem) - 2006

=== Short films and documentaries ===
- Bir Adam Yaratmak - 2014
- Geçmişin Gölgesi - 2013
- Fitnat : Irmak Delan - 2011
- Ve Merhaba Kainat: Nazım Hikmet (documentary) : Şükran Bircan - (Kendisi) - 2009
- Olasılıklar Üzerine : Melike Şansal - 2009
- Çip : Arif Yıldırdı - 2006
- Braun Silk Epil - (Series)

=== Theatre ===
- Guluk Guluk (Şarkıcı Yunus Tako) - Tiyatro Lir
- Bahar Şenliği - Tiyatro Lir
- Kahraman Köpek Çiço - Tiyatro Lir
- Yalnız Aslan Liyuva - Tiyatro Lir
- Can Dostum : Hadi Çaman - Hadi Çaman Yeditepe Theatre
- Çekirge Bir Sıçrar : İdil Yazgan İdil Yazgan (Moda D.K Theatre)
- Venedik Taciri (The Merchant of Venice) : William Shakespeare
- Narkoperasyon : Bileşke Theatre
- Kadınlık Bizde Kalsın : Yılmaz Erdoğan - Kocaeli MYO
- Benim Adım Elektrik : - İlkay Eser Theatre
- Karar&Çıkış : Performance show Acting Studio (Studio Oyuncuları)
