= Tremaine Emory =

American designer

Tremaine Emory is an American designer and creative consultant. He is the founder of clothing brand Denim Tears and the former creative director of Supreme.

Emory has worked as a creative consultant for publications such as The Face, brands such as Stüssy, Off-White and YEEZY as well as collaborating with some of the most influential figures in art, music and fashion including Frank Ocean, André 3000, Virgil Abloh, Tom Sachs, Theaster Gates and Hank Willis Thomas.

== Early life and family ==
Emory was born in Atlanta, Georgia, and raised in Jamaica, Queens, New York. His father served in the military and worked as a news cameraman for CBS for 38 years. Sheralyn Emory, Tremaine's mother, died in 2015.

== Career ==
In 2010, Emory moved to London, United Kingdom to work for Marc Jacobs. Emory served as creative consultant and brand director for Kanye West from 2016 to 2018. Before launching his brand Denim Tears, Emory was the art and brand director-at-large for Stüssy.

Emory co-founded the collective "No Vacancy Inn" with his business partner Acyde. No Vacancy Inn operates as a on-physical entity, which includes radio show, DJ sets, party series, pop-up shop ad may more!

Emory founded the clothing label, Denim Tears, in 2019. The first collection released on the 400th anniversary of slavery. The collection explored the history of cotton and slavery in America. The clothing featured floral wreath prints on the denim jeans, hoodies, and sweatshirts. In February 2022, Emory was appointed as the first creative director for Supreme. Emory left the role of creative director at Supreme in August 2023 after disagreements between him and the founder of Supreme James Jebbia. His resignation letter was focused on Supreme's inability to communicate about the cancellation of a collaboration he set in place with Arthur Jafa and Supreme.

== Personal life ==
In 2023, Emory had a lower aorta aneurysm, which resulted in him staying in the hospital from October to the end of December.
