= Emre İşçiler =

Turkish footballer

Personal information
- Full name: Emre İşçiler
- Date of birth: 28 September 1989 (age 37)
- Place of birth: Manisa, Turkey
- Height: 1.76 m (5 ft 9 in)
- Position: Attacking midfielder

Team information
- Current team: Cizrespor

Youth career
- 2004–06: Manisaspor

Senior career*
Years	Team	Apps	(Gls)
2008–12	Balıkesirspor		
- * Club domestic league appearances and goals

Emre İşçiler (born 28 September 1989 in Manisa, Turkey) is a Turkish professional footballer who currently plays as an attacking midfielder or winger for Cizrespor.

== Career ==
İşçiler became a fan favorite with his assists and his goals for Balkes fans.

He started his professional career with Manisaspor and he also played for İzmirspor with two years loan contract.

His contract will end on 31 May 2012 by his profile in Turkey Football Federation.
