= Emre Kartari =

Turkish jazz percussionist

Emre Kartari (born in Ankara, Turkey) is a Turkish jazz percussionist.

Born into a family of musicians and artists, he moved to the United States when he was ten years old. Soon after, he began to study drums, which led to studying jazz percussion with T. Howard Curtis at Virginia Commonwealth University. He holds an M.A. in jazz performance and composition from New York University and received the Barney Josephson Award in 2003.

He toured the United States with the spoken-word, hip-hop group, Jazz Poets Society. While in New York, Kartari studied with Adam Nussbaum, John Riley, Tony Moreno, Billy Hart and Jamey Haddad. He has performed with jazz greats including Charlie Byrd, Jim McNeely, Ralph Lalama, Vic Juris, Ron McClure, Mike Richmond, David Liebman, Justin Kauflin, Chris Whiteman and Houston Person.

His first CD as a leader, Perpetual Anxiety, is released in Turkey under the Dogan Music label. In 2005, he performed and recorded for the rock band Brindley Brothers, the electric jazz group, Signals, and with the trio Big Girl, featuring Darius Jones and Trevor Dunn.

Kartari has played and recorded with his own quartet Origin, featuring David Liebman, John D'earth and Howard Curtis.

As an educator, he worked with the New York Pops-Mentors in Music program. He has initiated jazz degree programs at the Hacettepe University Ankara State Conservatory, and in Yasar University in Turkey.

He currently lives in Richmond, Virginia and teaches at James Madison University, Virginia Commonwealth University, and Longwood University.
