= John Emery =

John Emery may refer to:

- John Emery (actor) (1905–1964), American stage, film, radio and television actor
- John Emery (bobsleigh) (1932–2022), Canadian Olympic bobsledder
- John J. Emery (1898–1976), developer of the Carew Tower in Cincinnati, Ohio
- John Emery (English actor) (1777–1822), English actor
- John Q. Emery (1843–1928), American educator
- John Emery (paediatrician) (1915–2000), British-born paediatric pathologist and professor
- John Emery (MP) for Worcester

== See also ==
- John Emory (1789–1835), American bishop of the Methodist Episcopal Church
- John Emory (baseball) (1886–1968), American Negro leagues baseball player
