= Colin Emery =

Scottish footballer

Personal information
- Full name: Colin Cameron Emery
- Date of birth: 4 July 1946 (age 80)
- Place of birth: Tradeston, Scotland
- Position: Outside right

Youth career
- Netherlee Church

Senior career*
Years	Team	Apps	(Gls)
1966	Third Lanark	2	(0)
1966–1971	Queen's Park	50	(6)

International career
1967–1968	Scotland Amateurs	4	(0)
- * Club domestic league appearances and goals

Colin Cameron Emery (4 July 1946) was a Scottish amateur football outside right who played in the Scottish League for Queen's Park. He was capped by Scotland at amateur level. He made 50 appearances and scored six goals for Queen's Park in the Scottish League between 1966 and 1971.
