= Canvas Outdoor Museum Show =

- Founded: 2015; 11 years ago
- Website: www.canvaswpb.org

Canvas Outdoor Museum Show is an annual public art exhibition held each November in Downtown West Palm Beach, Florida, featuring site‑specific murals and installations by international and local artists across public spaces and selected buildings. The exhibition was founded in 2015 by West Palm Beach gallery owner Nicole Henry and has included a Local Showdown that invites area artists to compete for inclusion in the following year’s programming.

The inaugural show in November 2015 featured 20 artists from the United States, Argentina, Brazil, Belgium, the United Kingdom, Germany, and Puerto Rico, with installations across locations such as the City Hall Courtyard, Royal Park Bridge, Fern Street, and The Whitney.

In 2016, the exhibition expanded to include nearby Lake Worth, continuing the model of large‑scale murals and installations, alongside the local artist competition. Subsequent editions have returned to West Palm Beach and Lake Worth, with returning and new participants highlighted in regional and national coverage.

== Charity ==
CANVAS Art Charities, a registered 501(c)(3) organization established in August 2015, supports and curates year‑round public art programming associated with the exhibition, including residencies such as the 2015 commission by Dean Zeus Coleman in Downtown Abacoa in Jupiter, Florida.

=== Board of directors ===
- Nicole Henry, owner, Nicole Henry Fine Art
- Elin Nordegren, philanthropist
- Alex Foster, co‑founder and managing principal, Atlas Partners
- Michael Weinberg, senior vice president, Merrill Lynch
- William Corrente, founding partner, CS Capital Group
- Michelle Grande, philanthropist, Berlin Family Foundation
- Roy Assad, managing partner, Human Capital Group; COO, M&V Magazine

=== Residency artists ===
- 2015: Dean Zeus Coleman — Abacoa, Jupiter, Florida
