= Emch =

Emch or EMCH may refer to:

- Arnold Emch (1871-1959), American mathematician
- Enam Medical College and Hospital, a medical school in Bangladesh
- EMCh, Early Middle Chinese
