= Mister 880 =

1950 film by Edmund Goulding

- Directed by: Edmund Goulding
- Screenplay by: Robert Riskin
- Based on: True Tales from the Annals of Crime & Rascality by St. Clair McKelway
- Produced by: Julian Blaustein
- Starring: Burt Lancaster; Dorothy McGuire; Edmund Gwenn
- Narrated by: John Hiestand
- Cinematography: Joseph LaShelle
- Edited by: Robert Fritch
- Music by: Sol Kaplan
- Production company: 20th Century Fox
- Distributed by: 20th Century Fox
- Release date: September 29, 1950
- Running time: 90 minutes
- Country: United States
- Language: English
- Box office: $1,750,000

Mister 880 is a 1950 American romantic drama film directed by Edmund Goulding and starring Burt Lancaster, Dorothy McGuire and Edmund Gwenn. The film is based on the true story of Emerich Juettner, an elderly man who counterfeited just enough money to survive and skillfully eluded authorities for ten years. Juettner's story was first told in an article by St. Clair McKelway published in The New Yorker and later collected in McKelway's book True Tales from the Annals of Crime & Rascality.

Juettner, who was caught and arrested in 1948, serving four months in prison, earned more money from the release of Mister 880 than he had produced in his entire counterfeiting career.

== Plot ==
Secret Service agent Steve Buchanan and his boss discuss Case 880, which involves fake $1 bills, each with an obvious mistake: Washington is spelled "Wahsington". Although the bills are blatantly amateur in quality, people rarely look closely enough at the bills to notice. The Secret Service nicknames the perpetrator "Mister 880" and his counterfeit notes are called "880s". Steve has tracked Mister 880's spending patterns and investigates areas of Brooklyn and the Bronx where 880 bills have been found.

Ann Winslow's elderly neighbor and junk dealer Skipper Miller returns two 880 bills in change when she purchases an ornament. Ann unknowingly spends one of the bills at a business that Steve is surveilling. To investigate her possible involvement, Steve asks her for a date. However, Ann learns from a business owner that he works for the Secret Service. To keep him interested, she reads a book on counterfeiting and plants false clues and uses outdated slang while on their dinner date. Steve realizes that Ann is not involved in any criminal activity and continues to date her.

Facing a $20 veterinary bill, Skipper prints $1 bills, which he has only done when destitute. Skipper finds that local businesses have flyers showing how to identify 880 bills. Aware of the heightened risk, Skipper buries his printing press and extra bills in the cellar. Ann arranges a job for him as a handyman.

Steve is offered a job in France, where counterfeiting is increasing, but he declines, partly because of Ann and partly because of the unresolved 880 case. Ann determines that Mister 880 is Skipper, but she is torn between loyalty to Steve and adherence to the law versus compassion for the elderly man.

Skipper's dog leads a neighborhood boy to the cellar, where the boy discovers the 880 bills, which he begins to spend. Questioning numerous boys who received 880 bills, Steve finally is led to Skipper. Ann pleads for leniency for Skipper, but Steve believes that counterfeiters must be punished to protect the integrity of currency and cannot ignore the law. Steve arrests Skipper, who admits to his crime but reasons that he did not cost anyone a significant financial loss, as he rarely passed more than $1 to anyone and his counterfeiting actually saved the government money.

Skipper stands trial, and Ann's lawyer friend to plead Skipper's case pro bono, but Skipper disclaims his fabricated account, admitting that he bought the press and made the plates himself. Steve pleads for leniency, arguing that although Skipper committed a crime, he was not motivated by greed, had no prior offenses and is a decorated Navy veteran. The judge forgoes a potential term of 15 years by sentencing Skipper to one year and one day in prison, making him eligible for parole in four months.

== Cast ==
- Burt Lancaster as Steve Buchanan
- Dorothy McGuire as Ann Winslow
- Edmund Gwenn as "Skipper" Miller
- Millard Mitchell as "Mac" McIntire
- Minor Watson as Judge O'Neil
- Hugh Sanders as Thad Mitchell
- Howard St. John as Chief
- James Millican as Olie Johnson
- Billy Gray as Mickey (uncredited)
- Larry Keating as James F. Lee (uncredited)
- Fess Parker as Fighting criminal (uncredited)

== Awards ==
Edmund Gwenn won the Golden Globe Award for Best Supporting Actor – Motion Picture and was nominated for the Academy Award for Best Supporting Actor.

Robert Riskin was nominated for the Edgar Award for Best Mystery Screenplay.
