= Alison Emery =

English ice hockey player

- Born: 9 September 1989 (age 37) Shoreham-by-Sea, England
- Height: 175 cm (5 ft 9 in)
- Weight: 69 kg (152 lb; 10 st 12 lb)
- Position: Defence
- Shoots: Right
- WNIHL team Former teams: Guildford Lightning; Streatham Storm
- National team: Great Britain
- Playing career: 2005–present

Alison Emery (born 9 September 1989 in Brighton, England) plays for Great Britain women's national ice hockey team as defenseman.
