= Emerich Juettner =

Austrian-American counterfeiter (1876–1955)

- Juettner in 1948
- Born: Emerich Juettner; January 1876; Austro-Hungarian Empire
- Died: January 4, 1955 (aged 78-79); New Hempstead, New York, United States
- Known for: Counterfeiting United States currency
- Criminal charge: Counterfeiting
- Penalty: 1 year and 1 day in prison and $1 fine

Emerich Juettner (January 1876 – January 4, 1955), also known as Edward Mueller or Mister 880, was an Austrian-American immigrant known for counterfeiting United States $1 bills and eluding the United States Secret Service for a decade, from 1938 to 1948. When caught, he openly admitted his actions, adding that he had never given more than one bill to anyone, so no person had lost more than one dollar. He was sentenced to one year and one day in prison and a one-dollar fine, and he later sold the rights to his story, which was made into the 1950 film Mister 880.

== Early and personal life ==
Emerich Juettner was born in January 1876 in Austria to a working-class family. He was the eldest of four siblings, having two brothers and a sister. On June 21, 1890, at the age of 14, he arrived in New York. He found work as a picture frame gilder before marrying Florence LeMein in 1902 at the age of 26. His wife gave birth to a son, Walter, in 1903 and a daughter, Florence, in 1918. To support his family, he began working as a maintenance man and building superintendent in New York's Upper East Side. His job allowed him and his family to live rent free in the basement of the building where he worked. His wife died in the 1918 Spanish flu pandemic, shortly after giving birth to their daughter Florence. He then became a junk collector.

== Counterfeiting scheme ==
After his wife's death, Juettner had limited financial means. In 1938, Juettner began using ten to twelve homemade counterfeited bills a week in select stores in the neighborhoods of Manhattan. Over the following ten years, Juettner continued to use his counterfeited bills sparingly, never repeating storefronts or tenders. The bills were always poorly made on cheap paper and included details such as Washington being misspelled "Wahsington."

After Juettner used his first bill at a local cigar shop, the Secret Service opened Case File 880 in what began a decade-long search.

He became impossible to track down, since the bills were low profile and were used so rarely in new places each time.

In 1948, the counterfeiting came to an end. After a fire in his apartment building, Juettner decided to throw out his destroyed counterfeiting materials into the street. Once snowfall came, the materials were effectively hidden. Later on, a group of children found several of Juettner's $1 bills and took them to their parents. The parents subsequently reported the found bills to the Secret Service. Upon arrival at his apartment, Juettner was arrested.

Juettner was later sentenced to one year and one day in prison, plus a one-dollar fine that elicited laughter from those inside the courtroom.

== Response from the media ==
In 1949, American journalist St. Clair McKelway wrote a series in The New Yorker about several different crimes. McKelway covered Juettner's story in a three-part series detailing counterfeiting in America and Juettner's life and scheme, later developing his story into a book. Entitled Annals of Crime, the series was combined with several comics and illustrations.

== Legacy ==
Former Secret Service Director James Maloney blamed Juettner for the rise in counterfeiting incidents in the United States.

=== Mister 880 ===
The life of Emerich Juettner inspired the 1950 comedy-drama film Mister 880, directed by Edmund Goulding and starring Burt Lancaster as the Secret Service agent in charge of the investigation and Edmund Gwenn (in a supporting role) as the character based on Juettner. The film was based on St. Clair McKelway's article on Juettner. Juettner attended the premier of the film. Gwenn won a Golden Globe Award and was nominated for an Academy Award for his performance in Mister 880. Ultimately, Juettner made more money from the release of Mister 880 than he had made by counterfeiting.

=== The 20th Century Fox Hour - "The Moneymaker" ===
An episode of The 20th Century Fox Hour, titled "The Moneymaker", was based on the movie and first aired on October 31, 1956. Here, the counterfeiter was an elderly lady, played by Spring Byington.
