= Americus Mayo =

Arkansas politician

Member of the Arkansas House of Representatives
- Incumbent
- Assumed office 1871
- Constituency: District 11

Personal details
- Born: 1820 or 1834
- Died: 1891
- Party: Republican

Americus Mayo (1820/1834 – March 18, 1891), sometimes referred to as Americus Mayes, was a state legislator in Arkansas. He served in the Arkansas House of Representatives for a single year in 1871. Details on his life have been difficult for scholars to determine.

== Biography ==
Definitive information about Mayo has been difficult for scholars to determine. This is because there is a scarcity of data on African American legislators in Arkansas, especially those who were not recorded by the Indianapolis Freeman.

Mayo was born in either 1820 or 1834. He may have been born into slavery in Virginia. He was African American and is described as both "Black" and "mulatto" in historical records. Mayo served in the United States Volunteer Corp during the American Civil War.

A Republican, he represented District 11 (Monroe County) in the Arkansas House of Representatives in 1871. While serving in the House, he opposed a bill that would have removed voting restrictions placed on James Camp Tappan as a result of his service in the Confederate States Army. He similarly opposed other bills aimed at restoring voting rights for Confederate veterans. When the House debated an impeachment resolution for Lieutenant Governor James M. Johnson, Mayo was one of a cadre of Black legislators who attempted to pass the resolution. The impeachment attempt, which was part of a broader series of impeachment resolutions that included Governor Powell Clayton and Supreme Court Justice John McClure, ultimately failed. Mayo later voted to end the impeachment proceedings, stating that "I came here to try and relieve my constituents from the burden of a high rate of taxation, and know that the impeachment proceedings are adding weight to that burden."

May was married and had one child. He died on March 18, 1891 in Pottsville, Pennsylvania.
