= Emerich =

Emerich, Emeric, Emerick and Emerik are given names and surnames. They may refer to:

== Given name ==
=== Pre-modern era ===
- Saint Emeric of Hungary (c. 1007–1031), son of King Stephen I of Hungary
- Emeric, King of Hungary (1174–1204)
- Emeric Kökényesradnót (died 1285 or 1286), Hungarian baron and soldier

=== Modern era ===
- Emerik Blum (1911–1984), Yugoslav Jewish businessman, philanthropist and founder of the conglomerate Energoinvest
- Emerich Coreth (1919–2006), Austrian philosopher, Jesuit and Catholic priest
- Emerich Dembrovschi (born 1945), Romanian football striker
- E. W. Emo (1898–1975), Austrian film director
- Emerik Feješ (1904–1969), Serbian naïve painter
- Emerich B. Freed (1897–1955), Hungarian-born American federal judge
- Emerick Ishikawa (1920–2006), American weightlifter
- Emerich Jenei (1937–2025), Romanian football player and coach
- Emerik Josipović (1834–1910), Croatian politician and
- Emerich Juettner (1876–1955), Austrian-American counterfeiter of $1 bills
- Emeric Partos (1905–1975), Hungarian-born American fashion designer and furrier
- Emeric Pressburger (1902–1988), Hungarian-British screenwriter, film director and producer
- Emerik Stenberg (1873–1927), Swedish draftsman, painter and folklorist
- Emeric Thököly (1657–1705), Prince of Upper Hungary and Prince of Transylvania, leader of anti-Habsburg uprisings
- Emerich Vogl (1905–1971), Romanian football player of Hungarian ethnicity
- Emerich Ullmann (1861–1937), Austrian surgeon
- Emeric Essex Vidal (1791–1861), English naval officer and watercolourist

== Surname ==
- Bob Emerick, American football player
- Fred Emerich (born 1945 or 1946), American politician
- Geoff Emerick (1946–2018), English recording studio audio engineer, best known for his work with The Beatles
- Johann Emerich (died 1499), printer and typographer in the Holy Roman Empire
- John H. Emerick (1843–1902), leading Union Army telegraph operator during the American Civil War and business executive
- Martin Emerich (1846–1922), American politician
- Louis Emerick (born 1960), British actor
- Paul Emerick (born 1980), American rugby player
- Scotty Emerick (born 1973), American country music singer-songwriter
- Shannon Emerick, American stage actress and voice actress
