= Emre (surname) =

Emre is a Turkish surname. Notable people with the surname include:

- Ahmet Cevat Emre (1876–1961), Turkish linguist
- Erhan Emre (born 1978), Turkish-German actor, director, producer, and writer
- Merve Emre, Turkish-American author, academic, and literary critic
- Süleyman Ârif Emre (1923–2019), Turkish politician and poet
- Yunus Emre (1238–1328), Turkish poet and mystic

== See also ==
- Emre, given name
