= Enriqueta =

Enriqueta is a given name. Notable people with the name include:

- Ana Enriqueta Terán (1918–2017), Venezuelan poet
- Enriqueta Augustina Rylands (1843–1908), the founder of the John Rylands Library, Manchester
- Enriqueta Basilio (1948–2019), Mexican athlete
- Enriqueta Jiménez, Mexican film actress and singer of the ranchera genre
- Enriqueta Lozano (1829–1895), Spanish writer
- Enriqueta Martí (1868–1913), Spanish child murderer, kidnapper and procuress of children
- Enriqueta Mayora (1921–1989), Mexican Olympic fencer
- Enriqueta Pinto, First Lady of Chile and the wife of President Manuel Bulnes
