= Billie Letts =

American novelist and educator

- Born: Billie Dean Gipson; May 30, 1938; Tulsa, Oklahoma, U.S.
- Died: August 2, 2014 (aged 76); Tulsa, Oklahoma, U.S.
- Occupations: Novelist, educator
- Spouse: Dennis Letts (m. 1958; died 2008)
- Children: 3; including Tracy

Billie Dean Letts (née Gipson; May 30, 1938 – August 2, 2014) was an American novelist and educator. She was a professor at Southeastern Oklahoma State University.

== Biography ==
Letts was born as Billie Dean Gipson in Tulsa, Oklahoma, the daughter of Virginia M. (née Barnes), a secretary, and William C. Gipson.

She married Dennis Letts, a professor and actor, in 1958. The couple had three children: Dana, Tracy (a playwright), and Shawn (a jazz musician/composer). Dennis Letts served as editor for his wife's novels. He died of lung cancer in Tulsa on February 22, 2008, aged 73.

Letts died in a Tulsa hospital from pneumonia on August 2, 2014, aged 76. She had recently been diagnosed with acute myeloid leukemia.

== Novels ==
- Where the Heart Is (1995)
- The Honk and Holler Opening Soon (1998)
- Shoot the Moon (2004)
- Made in the U.S.A. (2008)

== Awards and honors ==
- 1994 Walker Percy Award
- 1996 Oklahoma Book Award
- 1998 Oprah's Book Club – Best Novel nominee – Where the Heart Is
