= Emig =

Emig is a surname. Literally it is a diminutive of Emmerich. Notable people with the surname include:

- Charlie Emig (1875–1975), American baseball player
- Janet Emig (born 1928), American academic
- Jeff Emig (born 1970), American motorcycle racer
- Karl-Heinz Emig (born 1962), German footballer and manager
- Lelia Dromgold Emig (1872-1957), American genealogist and author
