= Young Guru Academy =

Young Guru Academy (YGA) Dream Partners Foundation
- Founded: 2000
- Founder: Sinan Yaman
- Purpose: Socially responsible leadership
- Location: Istanbul, Turkey
- Region served: Turkey & United States
- Key people: Sinan Yaman (Chairman and Founder); Asude Altıntaş (Co-President); Sadık Ünlü (Co-President)
- Website: www.yga.org.tr

Young Guru Academy (YGA) is an international non-profit organisation established in 2000 in Turkey. Its volunteers develop international projects to help solve the problems communities face.

== Awards and Accolades ==
- My Dream Companion, has received first place at GSMA awards twice, making it the first app to do so.
- WeWalk has won the Gold prize in the Edison Awards 2018.
- YGA graduates have been chosen by Forbes magazine as "30 Under 30" innovators twice.
- YGA has been chosen as a “Great Place to Work” in 2016 and 2017. With a trust index of 100%, it was the only NGO to be chosen in Europe. YGA has also been chosen as a GPTW ambassador due to the high trust index.

== YGA Programs ==
Over 50 thousand university and high school students apply to YGA every year. After a 5-step process, 50 chosen students are admitted to the program. Scientists, innovators, and leaders such as Prof. Aziz Sancar, Ali Koç, Faruk Eczacıbaşı, Prof. Mehmet Toner, Prof. Kristi Raube, and Prof. Doğan Cüceloğu train these admitted volunteers. Over 5000 hours of volunteer work and education allows the knowledge to be implemented in their lives. YGA's global partners such as Harvard, MIT, Columbia, Brown, Technical University of Munich, Polytechnic of Turin, London Business School and UC Berkeley allows students from those institutions to join YGA volunteers in the field.

== Finances ==
70% of financial resources of YGA are donated by over 50 international corporations, %20 is crowdfunded, and %10 is raised by startups by YGA graduates. In 2020, this number is planned to reach 50%.

Such startups and innovations include:

- The largest Hydrosolar Plant in Turkey.
- The tourism app Piri which has provided audio tour guides for over 200 thousand uses, and was the most popular Travel app in the marketplace.

== Global Reach ==
YGA has offices in London, UK and Turin, Italy.
