= Arrigo =

Arrigo is an Italian given name. Derived from the Latin form Arrigus (which in turn was a variation of Henricus), already used in Tuscany in the XI century, it was widely diffused during the Middle Ages.

== Given name ==
- Arrigo Barnabé (born 1951), Brazilian actor
- Arrigo Boito (1842–1918), Italian librettist and composer
- Arrigo Boldrini (1915–2008), Italian politician and partisan
- Arrigo Fiammingo (c. 1530 – 28 September 1597), Flemish painter called Hendrick van den Broeck
- Arrigo Sacchi (born 1946), former Italian football manager
- Arrigo Solmi (1873–1944), Italian scholar and politician

== Surname ==
- Noel Arrigo (1949–2025), Maltese jurist

== Fictional characters ==
- Arrigo, a fictional character in the opera I vespri siciliani by Giuseppe Verdi
