= Amaury =

Amaury (from the Old French Amalric) or Amauri may refer to:

== People ==
=== Surname ===
- Philippe Amaury (1940–2006), French publishing tycoon

=== Given name ===
- Amaury du Closel (1956–2024), French composer, conductor and writer
- Amaury Duval (1760–1838), French writer
- Amaury Duval (1808–1885), French painter
- Amaury, Count of Valenciennes, 10th-century noble in Hainaut
- Amaury de Montfort (disambiguation), several people, lords of Montfort and counts of Évreux
- Amaury Filion (born 1981), Dominican basketball player
- Amaury Guichon (born 1991), Swiss-French pastry chef
- Amaury Gutiérrez (born 1963), Cuban singer and musician
- Amaury of Jerusalem (Amalric; 1136–1174), king of the Crusader state of Jerusalem
- Amaury Kruel (1901–1996), Brazilian military officer and politician
- Amaury Nolasco (born 1970), Puerto Rican actor
- Amaury Pasos (1935–2024), Brazilian basketball player and coach
- Amaury Telemaco (born 1974), Dominican baseball player
- Amaury Vassili (born 1989), French tenor
- Sergio Amaury Ponce (born 1981), Mexican soccer player

== Other ==
- Montfort-l'Amaury, a French commune in Yvelines département, France
- Éditions Philippe Amaury (EPA), also known as Groupe EPA or the Amaury Group, a French media group
- Amaury Sport Organisation (ASO), part of the French media group, Éditions Philippe Amaury

== See also ==
- Amery (disambiguation)
- Amauri (disambiguation)
