= Emmerich (name) =

Emmerich is both a surname and a given name. Notable people with the name include:

== Given name ==
- Emmerich Joseph von Breidbach zu Bürresheim (1707–1774), German bishop
- Emmerich Danzer (born 1944), Austrian figure skater
- Emmerich Kálmán (1882–1953), Hungarian composer
- Emmerich Rath (1883–1962), Czech track and field athlete
- Emmerich Teuber (1877–1943), Austrian scouting leader
- Emmerich de Vattel (1714–1767), Swiss philosopher, diplomat, and legal expert

== Surname ==
- André Emmerich (1924–2007), German-American gallerist
- Andreas Emmerich (1739–1809), German soldier and military theorist, author of The Partisan in War
- Anne Catherine Emmerich (1774–1824), German Roman Catholic Augustinian nun, stigmatic, mystic, visionary and ecstatic
- Bob Emmerich (1891–1948), American baseball player
- Christian Emmerich, or Blixa Bargeld (born 1959), German composer, author, actor, singer, musician, performer and lecturer
- Jörg Emmerich (born 1974), German footballer
- Klaus Emmerich (director) (1943–2026), German film director and screenwriter
- Klaus Emmerich (journalist) (1928–2021), Austrian journalist
- Lothar Emmerich (1941–2003), German footballer
- Marcel Emmerich (born 1991), German politician
- Max Emmerich (1879–1956), American track and field athlete and gymnast
- Noah Emmerich (born 1965), American film actor
- Peter Emmerich (born 1973), American illustrator
- Roland Emmerich (born 1955), German film director, screenwriter, and producer
- Slim Emmerich (1919–1998), American baseball player
- Toby Emmerich (born 1963), American producer, film executive, and screenwriter

== Fictional characters ==
- Alonzo D. Emmerich, from the film The Asphalt Jungle
- The Emmerich family, from the video game series Metal Gear
- Emmerich Voss, the overarching antagonist of the video game Indiana Jones and the Great Circle

== See also ==
- Amerigo (disambiguation)
- Emmrich
