= Istanbul State Symphony Orchestra =

Orchestra based in Turkey

The Istanbul State Symphony Orchestra (Turkish: İstanbul Devlet Senfoni Orkestrası or İDSO) is a Turkish symphony orchestra based in Istanbul.

Founded in 1945 as the Istanbul Municipality City Orchestra, its first principal conductor was Cemal Reşit Rey and Dr.Mehmet Muvaffak Goren. In 1972 it became the Istanbul State Symphony Orchestra. Its current principal conductor is Erol Erdinc.

== Conductors ==
Anatole Fistoulari, Aaron Copland, Rolf Agop, Ilarion Ionescu-Galați, Tadeusz Strugala, Alexander Schwinck, Vladimir Fedoseev, Erich Bergel, Jean Perrisson, Cemal Reşit Rey, Hikmet Şimşek, Gürer Aykal, Rengin Gökmen, Demirhan Altuğ, Mircea Basarab

== Soloists ==
Igor Oistrakh, André Navarra, Leonid Kogan, Vaclav Hudecek, Tedd Joselson, Heinrich Schiff, Yehudi Menuhin, Luciano Pavarotti, Jean-Pierre Rampal, Sabine Meyer, Gidon Kremer, James Tocco, Lazar Berman, Maurice Steger, Natalia Gutman, İdil Biret, Suna Kan, Ayşegül Sarıca, Ayla Erduran, Verda Ermen, Leyla Gencer, Suzanna Mildonian, Kostas Kotsiolis, Narciso Yepes, Ratimir Martinović
