= İstemihan Taviloğlu =

- From: Taviloglu's Personal Album.

Background information
- Born: 15 April 1945; Tekirdağ, Turkey
- Died: 17 March 2006 (aged 60) İzmir, Turkey
- Genres: Classical
- Occupations: Composer, Educator, and Arranger
- Instruments: Violin, Clarinet, Piano

İstemihan Taviloğlu (15 April 1945 – 17 March 2006) was a Turkish composer and a music educator. He's most known piece is the Clarinet Concerto which happens to be the first ever Clarinet Concerto composition from a Turkish composer. He is also the co-founder of the Musicology department in Ankara State Conservatory. He is also known as the teacher of all the musicians that came from conservatories in Turkey.

Born in Tekirdağ, Turkey on April 15, 1945, he was the third child of Ahmet and Nuriye Taviloglu. Istemihan entered the Istanbul Conservatory at the age of eleven began violin instruction for one year, and changed his concentration to clarinet under the direction of Tevfik Çelen. In 1963 he transferred to Ankara State Conservatory and continued his clarinet education with Hayrullah Duygu. After he graduated with a music performance degree as a clarinet player he began pursuing his Master's and DMA degrees in music composition and theory under Adnan Saygun and Erçivan Saydam. In addition he also took composition from Ilhan Usmanbaş and studied Music Theory and Solfege with Muammer Sun.

Taviloğlu taught at Ankara State Conservatory and at Dokuz Eylül Conservatory in İzmir. He is known as the composer of the first Turkish clarinet concerto.

== Youth ==
Born in Tekirdağ, Turkey on April 15, 1945, he was the third child of Ahmet and Nuriye Taviloglu. His musical influence directly came from his father even though his father was a school teacher, expressed great passion for music and played mandolin for fun. Soon after his birth the Taviloglu family moved to Pasabahce, Istanbul and this is where Istemihan entered Istanbul Conservatory to study violin. After finishing the junior high in Istanbul Conservatory, he transferred to Ankara Conservatory to study Clarinet with Hayrullah Duygu, after graduating with the Honors degree he joined the Ankara State Opera as an Orchestra member. After performing few years as member of the orchestra he decided to continue his education and become a composer.

== Compositions ==
- Op. 1 One, Two, Three, Four, for orchestra, for orchestra, 1983.
- Op. 5 Sport, for orchestra, 1984; World Premier: Presidential Symphony Orchestra (CSO), 1984.
- Op. 6 Five in One Place, 1984; World Premier: Presidential Symphony Orchestra (CSO).
- Op. 9 Suit, for orchestra, 1982: World Premier: Presidential Symphony Orchestra (CSO) Conductor: Tadeusz Strugała, 1993.
- Op. 12 Clarinet Concerto, 1979; World Premier: Presidential Symphony Orchestra (CSO) Conductor: Gürer Aykal, Soloist: Aykut Doğansoy, March 16, 1979.
