= Opernhaus Wuppertal =

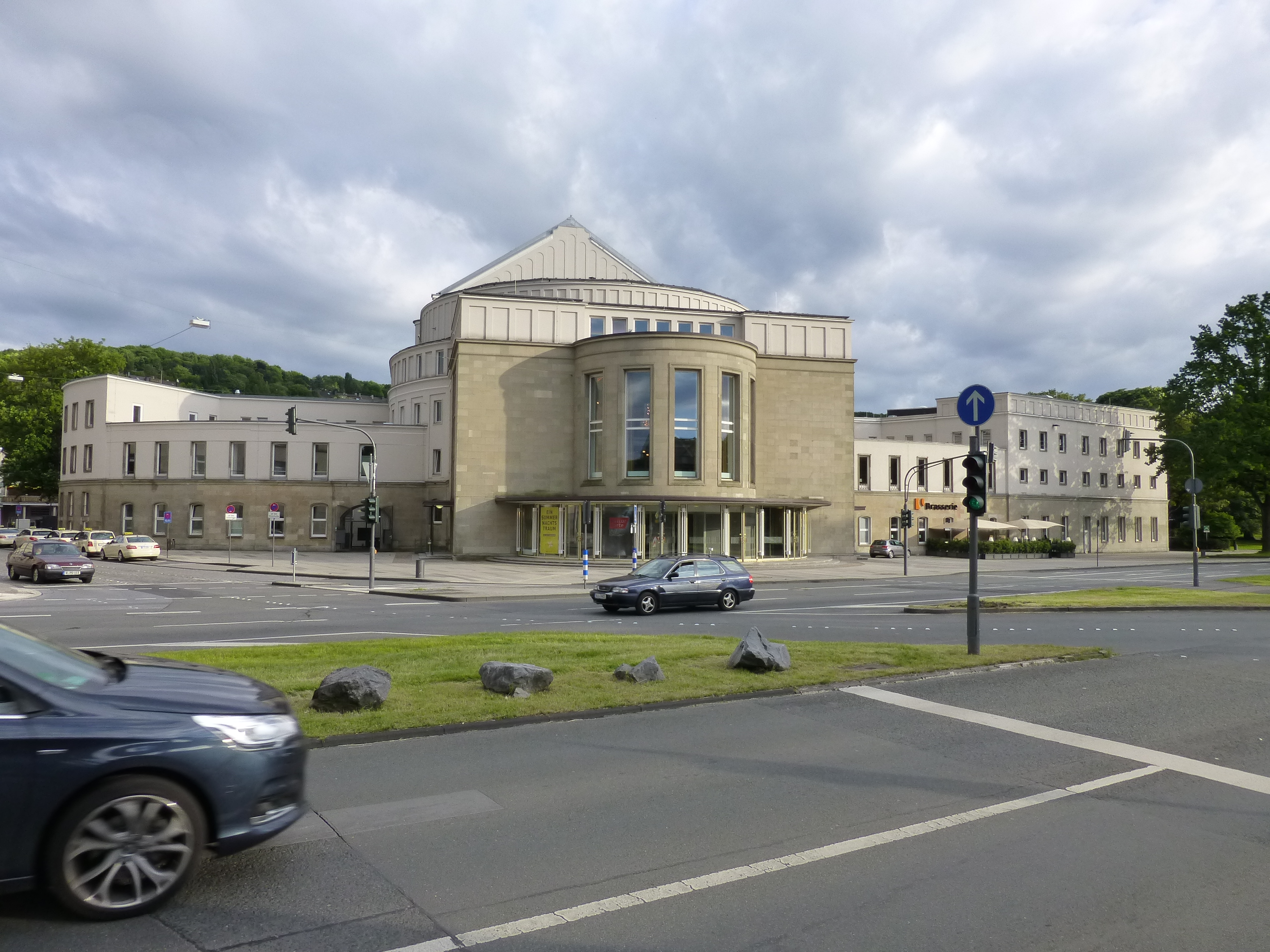
- The theatre in 2013
- Former names: Stadttheater Barmen

General information
- Location: Wuppertal, North Rhine-Westphalia, Germany
- Coordinates: 51°16′02″N 7°11′35″E
- Construction started: 1905
- Renovated: 1956; 1970s; 2006–2009

Design and construction
- Architect: Carl Moritz

Website
- wuppertaler-buehnen.de

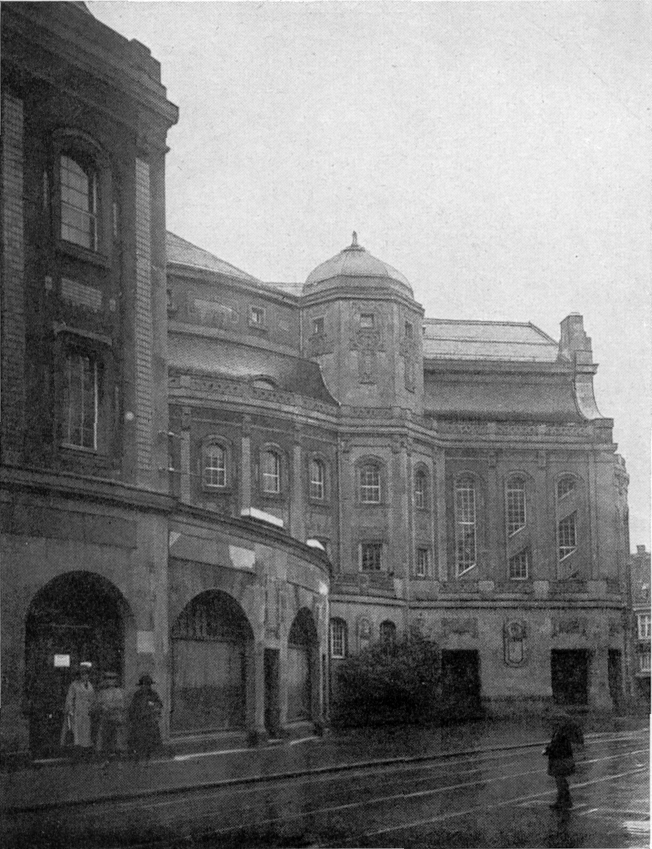
The building in 1905

The Opernhaus Wuppertal (Wuppertal Opera House) is a German theatre in Wuppertal, North Rhine-Westphalia. It houses mostly performances of operas, but also plays, run by the municipal Wuppertaler Bühnen. The house is also the venue for dance performances by the Tanztheater Wuppertal Pina Bausch company created by Pina Bausch.

The house was built in 1905 on a design by Carl Moritz as the Stadttheater Barmen ("Barmen Municipal Theatre"). It was partially rebuilt after being severely damaged during World War II and again restored over the period 2006–2009. The theatre is located in the center of Wuppertal-Barmen, served by the Wuppertal Suspension Railway and Wuppertal-Barmen station.

== History ==
The original building was the Stadttheater Barmen ("Barmen Municipal Theatre"), an all-purpose theatre for opera and plays built in 1905 before Barmen was merged into Wuppertal. It was designed by the architect Carl Moritz in a style drawing on neo-Baroque and Jugendstil. It was completed in 1907. The theatre was severely damaged during a World War II air raid on the night of 30 May 1943, which destroyed the hall completely and also damaged the stage area. It was rebuilt from 1954 to 1956, but with restricted Jugendstil elements which the leader of the project termed "schwerverdauliche Formensprache" (a language of forms hard to digest). The house reopened on 14 October 1956, one of the first war-damaged theatres in Germany to resume operations, with a gala performance of Paul Hindemith's Mathis der Maler.

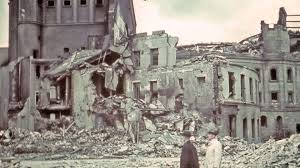
Wuppertal Opera House after the bombing raids of 1943

The theatre was extended in the 1970s and renovated from 2006 to 2009. Since 1989, the building has been protected as an architectural monument.

== Premieres and revivals ==
World premieres have included Yvonne, Prinzessin von Burgund by Boris Blacher, after the play by Witold Gombrowicz, which debuted on 15 September 1973. Die fünf Minuten des Isaak Babel (The five minutes of Isaac Babel) by Volker David Kirchner, subtitled A Scenic Requiem, premiered on 19 April 1980, conducted by Hanns-Martin Schneidt and staged by Friedrich Meyer-Oertel. The first complete performance of Kyberiade, an opera by Krzysztof Meyer based on The Cyberiad stories by Stanisław Lem, was staged on 11 May 1986. Kirchner's Erinys, Threnos in two parts after the Oresteia by Aeschylos was first performed on 15 April 1990. A commissioned opera, Gormenghast by Irmin Schmidt on a libretto by Duncan Fallowell, was first performed on 15 November 1998.

The Opernhaus Wuppertal is known for revivals of operas that are not part of the standard repertoire, or have not been for a very long time. Monteverdi's Il ritorno d'Ulisse in patria was performed in 1959 in a version by Ernst Krenek. E. T. A. Hoffmann's Undine was revived in 1970. In 1981 Meyer-Oertel staged Wagner early Die Feen, and in 1994 Schubert's Fierrabras, conducted by Peter Gülke. In the 21st century, Haydn's L'incontro improvviso was performed in a German translation under the title Unverhofft in Kairo on 8 January 2011, and Wolfgang Fortner's Bluthochzeit was revived in 2013.

== Affiliated performers ==
Hans Schmidt-Isserstedt began his career as a repetiteur in 1923. Horst Stein was repetiteur from 1947 to 1951. Other conductors have included Imre Pallo (1964–1968).

Andreas Meyer-Hanno was director of opera director from 1959 to 1964, and Friedrich Meyer-Oertel from 1979 to 1996.

Ingrid Bjoner, who had made her stage debut in 1957 as Donna Anna in Mozart's Don Giovanni with the Norwegian National Opera, performed the part the same year in Wuppertal. Ticho Parly performed in 1962 the part of Mephisto in Busoni's Doktor Faust and the title role in Britten's Peter Grimes. Peter Hofmann sang his first Siegmund in Wagner's Die Walküre in 1974, a role which he repeated in Patrice Chéreau's historic centennial production of Der Ring des Nibelungen at the 1976 Bayreuth Festival.

Fritz Lehmann was Generalmusikdirektor (GMD) from 1938 to 1947, János Kulka from 1964 to 1975, Hanns-Martin Schneidt from 1975 to 1985. Peter Gülke from 1986 to 1996, and George Hanson from 1998 to 2004. Julia Jones was Generalmusikdirektorin of the company from 2016 to 2021, the first female conductor ever to be GMD of the company. In July 2020, the company announced the appointment of Patrick Hahn as its most recent GMD, effective with the 2021–2022 season. In December 2022, the company announced the extension of Hahn's initial 3-year contract for an additional two years, through the 2025–2026 season. Hahn is scheduled to conclude his tenure with the company at the close of the 2025-2026 season.

In 2025, Christian Reif made his first guest-conducting appearances with the company, in June 2025 with a production of Don Giovanni and in September 2025 with a symphony concert. In January 2026, the company announced the appointment of Reif as its next GMD, effective with the 2027-2028 season.

== General Music Directors (partial list) ==
- Fritz Lehmann (1938–1947)
- János Kulka (1964–1975)
- Hanns-Martin Schneidt (1975–1985)
- Peter Gülke (1986–1996)
- George Hanson (1998–2004)
- Toshiyuki Kamioka (2004–2016)
- Julia Jones (2016–2021)
- Patrick Hahn (2021–present)

== Tanztheater Wuppertal ==
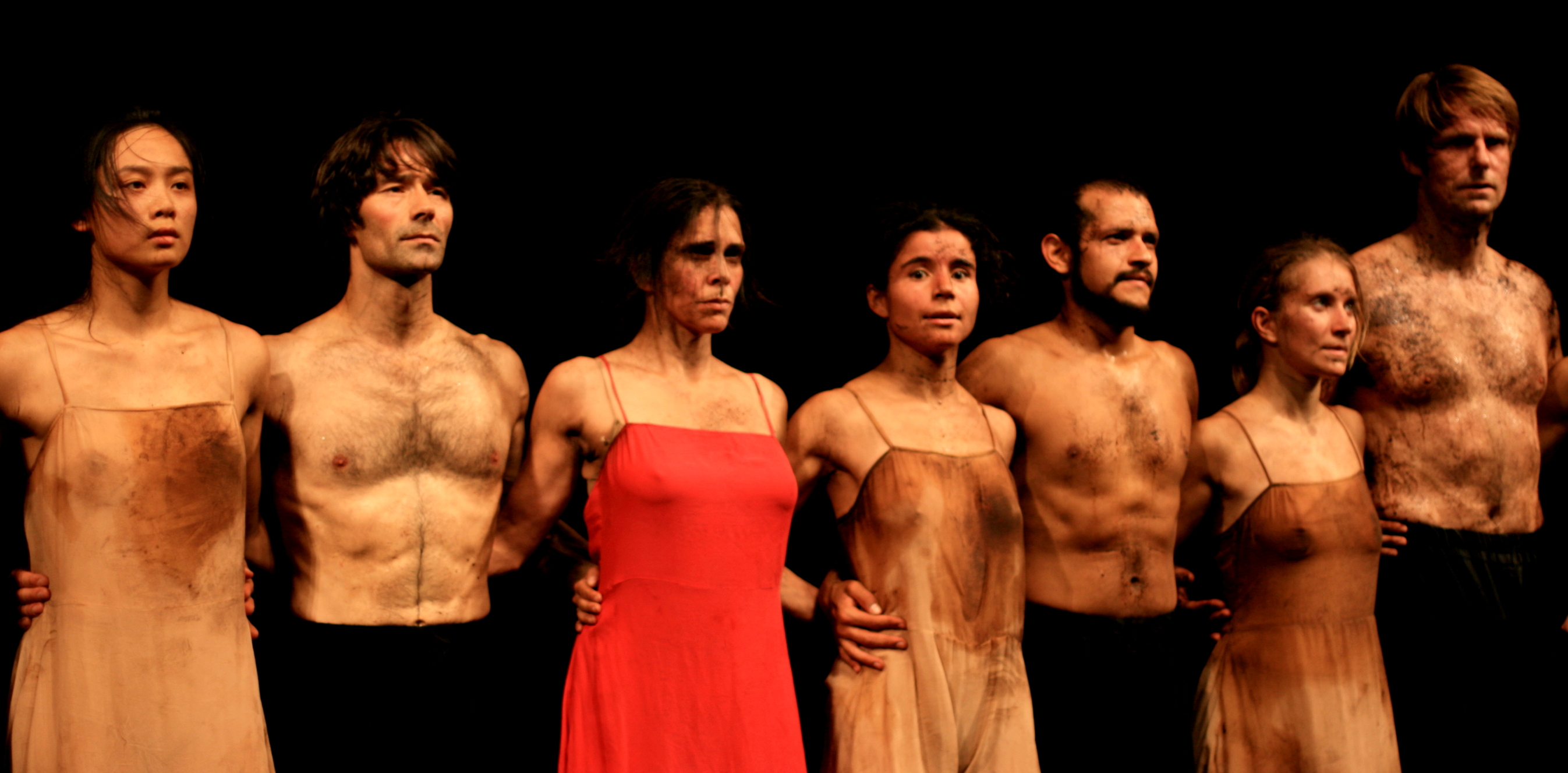
Frühlingsopfer, Tanztheater Wuppertal, 2009

The opera house is the home base for the dance company Tanztheater Wuppertal, founded by Pina Bausch. Performances have included 1975's Frühlingsopfer (The Rite of Spring) on a stage covered with soil, a production which has been revived many times; Café Müller, 1978, in which "dancers stumble around the stage crashing into tables and chairs"; Kontakthof, 1978, performed by an ensemble aged between 58 and 77; and 2005's Nelken.
