= Galati (surname) =

Galati is a surname. Notable people with the surname include:

- Frank Galati (1943–2023), American actor
- Giovanni Galati (1897–1971), Italian admiral
- Martinho Lutero Galati (1953–2020), Brazilian conductor
- Rocco Galati (born 1959), Italian-born Canadian lawyer
- Tom Galati (born 1951), American soccer player

== See also ==
- Galati (disambiguation)
- Ilarion Ionescu-Galați (born 1937), Romanian violinist
- Galați (disambiguation)
