= Bülent Evcil =

Turkish flutist (born 1968)

Bülent Evcil (born 1968) is a Turkish solo flutist and is the winner of the Royal Belgium Encouragement Medal of Art. He received the second place award in the Best Overall Performer Award at the 4th James Galway International Flute Seminar in Dublin.

== Education ==
Born in Istanbul, Evcil started his flute training under the tutelage of Prof. Mükerrem Berk at the State Conservatoire of Mimar Sinan University and graduated there with the highest distinction in 1988. In the same year, he studied at the Royal Brussels Conservatoire under the tutelage of Marc Grauwels by scholarship of Istanbul Philharmonic Foundation. He graduated in 1992 with the "Diplome Superieur avec Grand Distinction" by winning the "Premiere Prix" in chamber music.

He continued his education at the Heidelberg-Mannheim Music Academy under the tutelage of Jean-Michel Tanguy and obtained the "Qualification of Art" (Künstlerische Ausbildung) degree with the highest distinction (mit der Note eins) in 1996.

== Musical career ==
Evcil won many prizes and awards in various competitions, among which were:

- the second prize in the Turkey National Wind Instruments Competition
- the second prize in the Wolfgang Hoffmann Wind Instruments Competition
- the second place award in the Best Overall Performer Award at the 4th James Galway International Flute Seminar in Dublin.

These awards provided him the opportunity of becoming the student of James Galway, the famous flute virtuoso.

Evcil taught at the Istanbul Technical University (MIAM) in 2003. He was appointed the principal flutist to the Istanbul State Symphony Orchestra, and was invited to give "Master Classes", not only in Turkey, but also at the Texas Tech University at Lubbock, and University of Texas at El Paso in the United States. In May 2004, he was appointed to play the solo flute at the Arturo Toscanini Philharmonic Orchestra in Italy, under the world-famous conductor, Lorin Maazel. He subsequently made a European tour with the same orchestra.

These successes brought him to play the solo flute at other international orchestras. He had three recordings and concerts with the São Paulo State Symphony Orchestra (Brazil), and an Asian tour with the Italian International Symphonic Orchestra. Evcil also completed a CD with Camerata Leonis in Switzerland, and he is also the winner of the Royal Belgium Encouragement Medal of Art.

== Concerts ==
Evcil performed in many concerts, together with various groups, that includes:

- Kurpfälzische Chamber Orchestra
- Istanbul State Symphony Orchestra
- Borusan Istanbul Philharmonic Orchestra
- Antalya State Symphony Orchestra
- Philharmonic Lemberg Chamber Orchestra
- Çukurova State Symphony Orchestra
- Istanbul CRR Symphony Orchestra
- Toulon Symphony Orchestra
- Camerata Leonis Chamber Orchestra
- Carmina Quartett
- Frankfurt Quartett

He performed in such diverse countries as Belgium, Germany, Austria, United States of America, Italy, Hungary, Poland, Ukraine, Switzerland, Brazil, Turkey and took part in the music festivals of Kraków, Bayreuth, Lemberg and Istanbul. Evcil also played in Vienna with the Imperial Concerts Soloist Kapelle from 1996 to 1998, and was appointed in 1998 to the Istanbul State Opera and Ballet Orchestra, as well as the Istanbul Borusan Philharmonic Orchestra as a solo flutist, with which he still carries on his career as soloist.

== Official Web Page ==
http://www.bulentevcil.art
