= State Artist (Turkey) =

State Artist (Turkish: Devlet Sanatçısı, also sometimes translated as "National Artist") is an honorary title granted to prominent artists by the government of Turkey for their contributions to the Turkish culture. It was established in 1971 by the President of Turkey (Cevdet Sunay) and the Minister of Culture and Tourism.

The award is issued for people occupied in various categories of arts: music, dance, theatre, photography, cinema, visual arts, literature, etc.

== List of State Artists ==
By year, according to the list by the Ministry of Culture and Tourism of Turkey.

=== 1971 ===
- Adnan Saygun, composer
- Necil Kazım Akses, composer
- Ulvi Cemal Erkin, composer
- Mithat Fenmen, composer
- İlhan Usmanbaş, composer
- Gülay Uğurata, pianist
- İdil Biret, pianist
- Suna Kan, violinist
- Ayla Erduran, violinist
- Ayşegül Sarıca, pianist
- Verda Erman, pianist

=== 1981 ===
- Nevid Kodallı, composer
- Cemal Reşit Rey, composer
- Hikmet Şimşek, conductor
- Gürer Aykal, conductor
- İsmail Aşan, violinist
- Tunç Ünver, violinist
- Cüneyt Gökçer, actor
- Yıldız Kenter, actress
- Meriç Sümen, ballet dancer
- Suna Korad, opera singer

=== 1987 ===
- Nevzat Atlığ, choir conductor
- Ayhan Baran, opera singer
- Vasfi Rıza Zobu, actor
- Bedia Muvahhit, actress
- Mükerrem Berk, flutist
- Gülsin Onay, pianist
- Ayten Gökçer, actress

=== 1988 ===
- Aydın Gün, opera singer
- Leyla Gencer, opera singer

=== 1991 ===
- Necdet Yaşar, classical Turkish musician
- İsmail Baha Sürelsan, classical Turkish musician
- Alaattin Yavaşça, classical Turkish musician
- Zeki Müren, classical Turkish musician
- Teoman Önaldı, classical Turkish musician
- Yesari Asım Arsoy, classical Turkish musician
- Sadi Yaver Ataman, Turkish folk musician
- Nida Tüfekçi, Turkish folk musician
- Mustafa Geceyatmaz, Turkish folk musician
- Mustafa Turan, folk dances
- Barış Manço, pop music
- Hüseyin Sermet, pianist
- Güher Pekinel, pianist
- Süher Pekinel, pianist
- Okan Demiriş, opera singer
- Mete Uğur, opera singer
- Macide Tanır, actress
- Bozkurt Kuruç, actor
- Osman F. Seden, film director
- Türkan Şoray, film actress
- Hülya Koçyiğit, film actress
- Orhan Şaik Gökyay, poet
- Tarık Buğra, writer
- Attila İlhan, writer
- Ali Avni Çelebi, painter
- Sabri Berkel, painter
- Turan Erol, painter
- Devrim Erbil, painter
- Hüseyin Arıkan Özkan, sculptor
- Sadi Diren, ceramic art

=== 1998 ===
- Müzeyyen Senar
- Mehveş Emeç
- Şefika Kutluer
- Tekin Akmansoy
- Muazzez Abacı
- Metin Akpınar
- İzzet Altınmeşe
- Selmi Andak
- Avni Anıl
- Nezihe Araz
- Muzaffer Arıkan
- Orhan Asena
- Semih Balcıoğlu
- Recep Bilginer
- Ali Can
- Koral Çalgan
- İnci Çayırlı
- Merih Çimenciler
- Ali Doğan
- Haldun Dormen
- Armağan Elçi
- Erol Erdinç
- Özdemir Erdoğan
- Musa Eroğlu
- Muazzez Ersoy
- Semiha Berksoy
- Zeki Alasya
- Mengü Ertel
- Orhan Gencebay
- Nurşen Girginkoç
- Rengim Gökmen
- Ruşen Güneş
- Fahrettin Güven
- Nedret Güvenç
- Fikret Hakan
- Selahattin İçli
- Selim İleri
- Çolpan İlhan
- Yekta Kara
- Cemil Karababa
- Müşfik Kenter
- Kayıhan Keskinok
- Levent Kırca
- Atilla Manizade
- Yusuf Nalkesen
- Tankut Öktem
- Gazanfer Özcan
- Ahmet Özhan
- Münir Özkul
- Sezen Cumhur Önal
- Kutlu Payaslı
- Ajda Pekkan
- Ali Poyrazoğlu
- Ozan Sağdıç
- Mustafa Sağyaşar
- Samime Sanay
- Emel Sayın
- Timur Selçuk
- Nedret Selçuker
- Nesrin Sipahi
- Ferit Sidal
- Kamil Sönmez
- Muammer Sun
- Gülriz Sururi
- Dinçer Sümer
- Şener Şen
- Ziya Taşkent
- Orhan Taylan
- Okay Temiz
- Zekai Tunca
- Neriman Altındağ Tüfekçi
- Dilek Türker
- Nejat Uygur
- Necdet Varol
- Gönül Yazar
- Jale Yılmabaşar
- Nilüfer Yumlu
- Metin Yurdanur
- Gülşen Tatu

== See also ==
- National Artist, People's Artist, similar awards in other states
