= Cemaliye Kıyıcı =

- Born: Cemaliye İrfan; Famagusta, British Cyprus
- Died: 3 June 2016
- Known for: Opera

Cemaliye Kıyıcı (1940 - June 3, 2016) was the first female Turkish Cypriot opera singer.

== Life ==
Kıyıcı studied at Famagusta Namık Kemal High School. During World War II, she went to Turkey to receive professional conservatory education. In 1955, she started studying at the Opera-Singing department of Ankara State Conservatory. In 1960, she started working as a soloist at the Ankara State Opera and Ballet.
