= Jale Birsel =

Turkish actress (1927–2019)

- Born: 1927; Turkey
- Died: 17 November 2019 (aged 91–92); İzmir, Turkey
- Education: Ankara State Conservatory
- Occupation: Actress
- Spouse: Salah Birsel (m. 1961; died 1999)

Jale Birsel (1927 – 17 November 2019) was a Turkish actress.

Jale Birsel was born in 1927. She graduated from Ankara State Conservatory in 1949. She was a classmate of Yıldız Kenter. She worked at Ankara State Theatre. Her acting career lasted 38 years. At the age of 25, she contracted hearing loss due to incorrect medication usage. She had to commit to memory all actors' roles at the stage as she did not hear her counter person's words.

In 1961, she married Salah Birsel, a notable poet and writer, who died in 1999. Jale Birsel died from pneumonia in a nursing home at Çiğli, İzmir at the age of 92 on 17 November 2019.

She was honored with the title "State Artist".
