= János Kulka =

János Kulka may refer to:

- János Kulka (conductor) (1929–2001), Hungarian conductor and composer
- János Kulka (actor) (born 1958), Hungarian actor
