= Erol Erdinç =

Turkish conductor (born 1945)

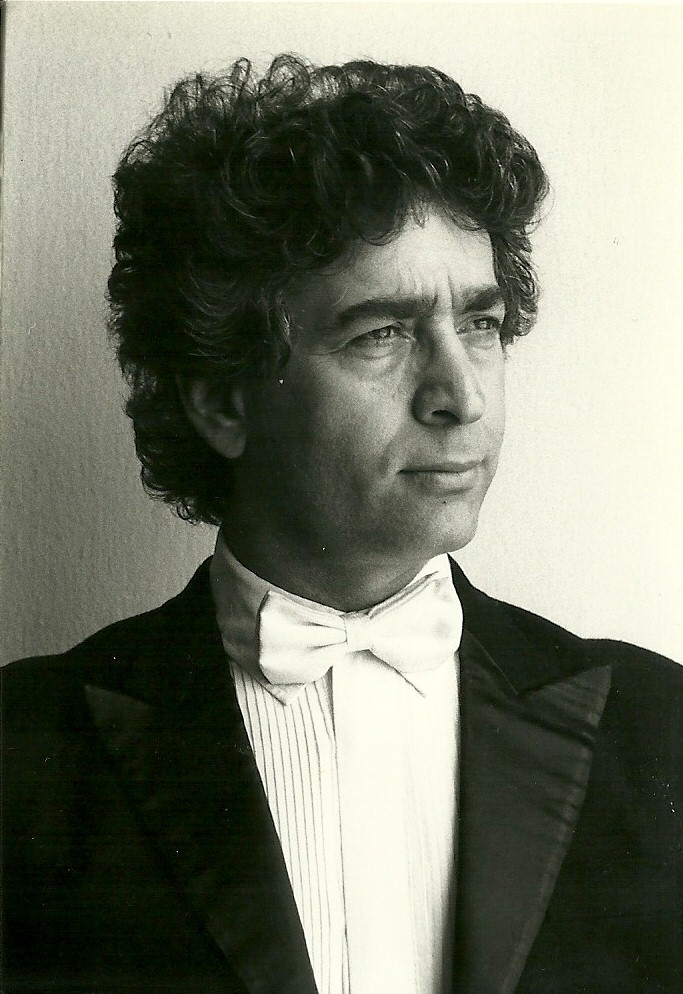
- Born: 30 November 1945 (age 80); İskenderun, Turkey
- Occupations: Conductor, composer, pianist and educator
- Website: www.erolerdinc.com

Erol Erdinç (born 30 November 1945) is a Turkish conductor of classical music, composer, pianist and educator.

== Early life and education ==
Erol Erdinç started out studying composition with Ahmet Adnan Saygun and piano with T. Çetiz at the Ankara State Conservatory. After graduating in composition he stayed on at the conservatory to teach, while also working as pianist for the Ankara State Opera and Ballet. In 1975, he went to Paris where he studied conducting under well-known musicians such as Jean Martinon at the Paris Conservatory; Pierre Dervaux at the Ecole Normale de Musique de Paris; composition with Nadia Boulanger and Pierre Petit; and accompaniment with Pierre Pontier. He also participated in master classes given by Pierre Boulez and Kirill Kondrashin.

== Career ==
Returning to his country in 1980, Erol Erdinç became conductor at the Ankara State Opera and Ballet.

Between 1983 and 2000, Erdinç was the chief conductor and musical director of the Istanbul State Symphony Orchestra as well as conducting teacher at the Istanbul University Conservatory. He then became dean of the Faculty of Music at Bilkent University, serving in this position until 2002. In 2003 he became a member of the Hacettepe University Ankara State Conservatory, where he led the Composition Department and the Hacettepe Symphony Orchestra. In 2010 he created the jazz department of this music faculty.

Erdinç has served as a jury member several times in international competitions, including the Canada International Music Competition and the Enescu Conductors Competition in Romania.

He produced music for the television network. In 1991, he created his own TV show on Turkish Radio and Television Corporation, the state cultural channel, in which different aspects of music were approached.

As a composer and orchestrator, he has written numerous works for orchestra, choir, symphonic jazz orchestra and music for children, integrating traditional Turkish modal music, popular styles, and jazz, and creating his own musical language.

As a chamber pianist, he is especially involved with jazz. While he was still a student at the Ankara Conservatory, he started to play solo piano in different formations. Many years later he introduced symphonic jazz music to Turkey, through the "Spring Concerts" with the Istanbul State Symphony.

He was also guest conductor with some European, American and Latin American orchestras around the world, including Saint Petersburg Philharmonic Orchestra, Russian State Symphony Orchestra and Orchestra Sinfonica di Roma. He has made guest appearances in France, Italy, Portugal, Spain, Belgium, Netherlands, Luxembourg, Poland, Hungary, Russia, Lithuania, Serbia, Azerbaijan, Belarus, Bulgaria, Czechoslovakia, Mexico and the United States. He conducted major orchestras through tours of South America, Argentina and Brazil.

An internationally recognized maestro, he has at least seven CD recordings with the Saint Petersburg Philharmonic Orchestra, Bilkent Symphony Orchestra and others.

Between 1992 and 1995 he was artistic advisor to the Ministry of Culture. From 2011 to 2013 he was named General Director of Fine Arts at the Ministry of Culture. In the same period he was music director and chief conductor of the Presidential Symphony Orchestra.

He made several CD recordings with different kinds of repertoire, including opera, symphonic music and jazz.

== Honours ==
Erol Erdinç has received a variety of honours and awards, including:

1994 - Medal of Honour, Republic of Turkey's 7th President Süleyman Demirel

1998 - State Artist, Republic of Turkey

2011 − Best Conductor of the Year award, Mavi Nota

2012 - Artist of the Year award, Hacettepe University of Ankara

2013 - Chevalier de l′Ordre des Arts et des Lettres, France

== Personal life ==
Erdinç has been married to Vera Oliveira Erdinç since 1983, Brazilian pianist at Ankara State Opera and Ballet. They have a son, Deniz Erdinç, a music student at Bilkent University Music Faculty.
