= Galați (disambiguation) =

Galați is a city in Romania.

Galați may also refer one of the following locations in Romania:

- Galați County, the county containing that city
- Galați, a village in Zlatna Town, Alba County
- Galați, a village in Pui Commune, Hunedoara County
- Galați, a former village, now a district of Făgăraș City, Brașov County
- Galați, tributary of the river Ampoi in Alba County
- Galați, tributary of the river Olt in Brașov County
- Galații Bistriței, a commune in Bistrița-Năsăud County

Galați may also refer to:

- 1940 Galați massacre of Jews during World War II
- Ilarion Ionescu-Galați (born 1937), Romanian violinist

== See also ==
- Galati (disambiguation)
