= National Artist =

National Artist is an honorary title issued by some states as the highest recognition of artists for their significant contributions to the cultural heritage of the nation.

An equivalent title, People's Artist, has been known in countries of the former Eastern Bloc and is also commonly translated as "National Artist".

In Turkey, a similar title is called State Artist (tr:Devlet Sanatçısı), which is also sometimes translated as "National Artist".

The following National Artist titles are known:

- Thailand National Artist
- National Artist of the Philippines
- National Artist of Azerbaijan
- National Artist of Czechoslovakia
- National Artist of Malaysia
