= Galati =

Galati may refer to:

- Galați, a city in eastern Romania.
- Galati Mamertino, municipality in the Metropolitan City of Messina in Sicily, Italy
- Galați County, in Moldavia region of Romania
- Galati (surname), surname

== See also ==
- Galați (disambiguation)
