= Muammer Sun =

Turkish composer (1932–2021)

Muammer Sun (15 October 1932 – 16 January 2021) was a Turkish composer of classical music.

== Biography ==
Sun was born in Ankara. He entered the Military Band School in 1947 and the Ankara State Conservatory in 1953. He studied under Ahmet Adnan Saygun on composition, Hasan Ferit Alnar on conducting, Muzaffer Sarıözen on folk music, M.R. Gazimihal, Ruşen Ferit Kam on traditional folk music and Kemal İlerici on Modes and Harmonies of Turkish Music. He graduated from Ankara State Conservatory on composition in 1960. He taught at the Ankara, İzmir, Istanbul State Conservatories and at the Music Department of Gazi University Institute of Education. He also served as a member of executive board of Turkish Radio and Television Corporation (TRT). He retired from his professorship at the Hacettepe University, Ankara State Conservatory Composition Department in October 1997. Muammer Sun was awarded the title "Devlet Sanatçısı" (literally "State Artist" or "National Artist") by the Turkish Ministry of Culture in 1998.
