= Verda Erman =

Turkish pianist (1944–2014)

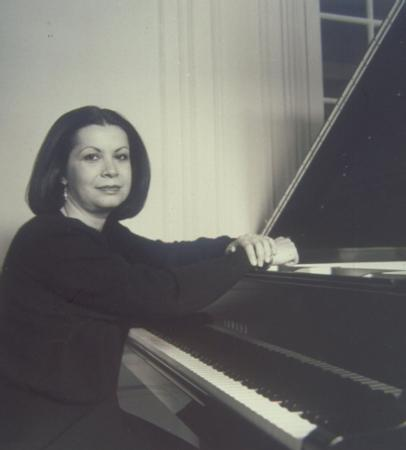
Verda Erman

Verda Erman (19 December 1944 – 21 July 2014) was a Turkish pianist.

Born in Istanbul in 1944, she began her career at the Istanbul Municipal Conservatory. In 1957, she was sent to study at the Conservatoire de Paris under Turkish law no. 6660 for students with "extraordinary talents." She studied under French pianist Lucette Descaves and graduated from the conservatory with the highest honors. Erman then worked with pianist Lazare Lévy to improve her skills on the piano. She also enrolled in lessons on counterpoint and harmony from French composer, Noël Gallon. She gave a series of concerts in Paris before returning to Turkey.

Erman performed with the Presidential Symphony Orchestra of Turkey. She won first prize in the Marguerite Long-Jacques Thibaud Competition (now called the Long-Thibaud-Crespin Competition) in Paris in October 1963. In 1965, Erman placed second in the Canada International Piano Competition.

Verda Erman was honored as a State Artist in 1971, the year the honorary title was created. She toured extensively around the world as a guest musician after 1971. She enjoyed successful tenures in Belgrade, Paris, Montreal and Bucharest. Pianist Rudolf Serkin invited her to the Marlboro Music School and Festival in the U.S. state of Vermont. She continued to perform with the Turkish Presidential Symphony Orchestra as a vocal artist on the orchestra's European tours.

Erman died in Paris on 21 July 2014, possibly of leukemia, at the age of 70.
