= Borusan Istanbul Philharmonic Orchestra =

Turkish orchestra based in Istanbul

Coordinates: 41.03038°N 28.97567°E

- Orchestra
- Native name: Borusan İstanbul Filarmoni Orkestrası
- Former name: Borusan Chamber Orchestra
- Founded: 1999
- Location: Istanbul, Turkey
- Principal conductor: Carlo Tenan
- Website: www.borusansanat.com

The Borusan Istanbul Philharmonic Orchestra (Turkish: Borusan İstanbul Filarmoni Orkestrası), also known as BIPO, is a Turkish symphony orchestra based in Istanbul. It was formed in 1999 from the earlier Borusan Chamber Orchestra and is supported by Borusan Holding through Borusan Sanat and the Borusan Kocabıyık Foundation.

== History ==
The history of the orchestra begins with the Borusan Chamber Orchestra, one of Borusan Holding's early cultural initiatives. In 1999 the ensemble was expanded into a symphonic orchestra under the direction of Turkish conductor Gürer Aykal, who became its founding music director and later honorary conductor. The orchestra gave its first concert on 13 May 1999 at the Silahhane building of Yıldız Palace in Istanbul.

During its first years, the orchestra developed a regular presence on both sides of the Bosphorus, giving concerts on the European and Anatolian sides of Istanbul. It also became a regular participant in the Istanbul International Music Festival, through which it developed a wider national and international profile.

Aykal served as music director from 1999 to 2009. Between 2009 and 2020 the orchestra was led by Austrian conductor Sascha Goetzel as artistic director and principal conductor. Under Goetzel, the orchestra increased its international activity. In July 2010 it appeared at the opening events of the Salzburg Festival, and in the same year it was named "Best Orchestra of the Year" by the Turkish classical music magazine Andante.

In 2014 the orchestra became the first Turkish orchestra to be invited to the BBC Proms, giving a concert entitled "Oriental Promise" at the Royal Albert Hall in London under Goetzel. The programme included music by Balakirev, Holst, Mozart, Handel, Respighi, Ulvi Cemal Erkin and the world premiere of Gabriel Prokofiev's Violin Concerto No. 1, performed by violinist Daniel Hope.

Patrick Hahn was appointed principal guest conductor and artistic adviser from the 2021–2022 season. In September 2023, Borusan Sanat announced that Italian conductor Carlo Tenan would become artistic director and principal conductor of the orchestra, serving as artistic director from 1 October 2023 and taking up the principal-conductor role from the 2024–2025 season.

== Tours and international appearances ==
BIPO has developed an international profile through appearances at major festivals and concert halls. In 2010 it appeared at the opening events of the Salzburg Festival, and in 2014 it made its BBC Proms debut in London.

In February 2016, the orchestra undertook a European tour from Vienna to Germany. In 2017 it performed two concerts at the Hong Kong Arts Festival and completed a European tour with Daniel Hope and Vadim Repin. The 2017 tour included concerts in Essen, Ljubljana, Vienna and Zurich, and featured Mark-Anthony Turnage's Shadow Walker, a concerto for two violins and orchestra commissioned by BIPO, the Essen Philharmonic and the Trans-Siberian Art Festival.

In 2018, the orchestra toured Europe with violinist Nemanja Radulović and performed at the Théâtre des Champs-Élysées in Paris. In 2025, during its 25th season, BIPO made a United Kingdom tour under Carlo Tenan with cellist Pablo Ferrández, giving concerts in Perth, Edinburgh, London, Guildford and Sheffield. Later in 2025, the orchestra appeared at the Schleswig-Holstein Music Festival with Fazıl Say under Tenan, including performances at the Elbphilharmonie in Hamburg and the Deutsches Haus in Flensburg. Borusan Sanat described the Hamburg concert as the first performance by a Turkish orchestra at the Elbphilharmonie.

== Guest artists and conductors ==
The orchestra has collaborated with Turkish and international conductors and soloists in Istanbul, on tour and in recordings. Conductors associated with the orchestra have included Gürer Aykal, Sascha Goetzel, Patrick Hahn, Carlo Tenan, Thomas Rösner, George Pehlivanian, Rengim Gökmen, Alexander Liebreich and Nayden Todorov.

Soloists and guest artists who have appeared with BIPO or recorded with the orchestra include Midori, Daniel Hope, Vadim Repin, Nemanja Radulović, Fazıl Say, Pablo Ferrández, Ksenija Sidorova, Valentina Lisitsa, Camille Thomas, Gökhan Aybulus, Pelin Halkacı Akın, Bülent Evcil, Maxim Vengerov, Vadim Gluzman, Dimitris Sgouros, Alexander Rudin, Suna Kan, İdil Biret, Ayşegül Sarıca, Ayla Erduran, Gülsin Onay, Anna Tomowa-Sintow, Olga Kern, Corey Cerovsek and Stanislav Ioudenitch.

== Recordings ==
BIPO has recorded for labels including Onyx Classics, Deutsche Grammophon and Prospero. Its recordings include Respighi, Hindemith, Schmitt, conducted by Sascha Goetzel for Onyx; Music of the Machine Age, also with Goetzel; and Rimsky-Korsakov's Scheherazade.

In 2016 the orchestra appeared with accordionist Ksenija Sidorova on Carmen, released by Deutsche Grammophon. It later recorded Tchaikovsky repertory and the album Baïka with Nemanja Radulović for Deutsche Grammophon. The orchestra's Onyx release Turnage & Berlioz documents live recordings from the 2017 European tour with Daniel Hope and Vadim Repin at the Musikverein in Vienna. In 2023, it recorded Richard with tenor Daniel Behle under Thomas Rösner for Prospero, and in 2025 an Onyx album of works by Bartók, Enescu, Kodály and Martinů under Carlo Tenan was released digitally.

== Artistic leadership ==
Gürer Aykal was the orchestra's founding music director and principal conductor from 1999 to 2009 and later became honorary conductor. Sascha Goetzel served as artistic director and principal conductor from 2009 to 2020. Patrick Hahn was appointed principal guest conductor and artistic adviser from the 2021–2022 season. Carlo Tenan was announced as artistic director from October 2023 and principal conductor from the 2024–2025 season.

== Music directors and principal conductors ==
- Gürer Aykal (1999–2009)
- Sascha Goetzel (2009–2020)
- Carlo Tenan (2024–present)
