= Julia Jones (conductor) =

British conductor

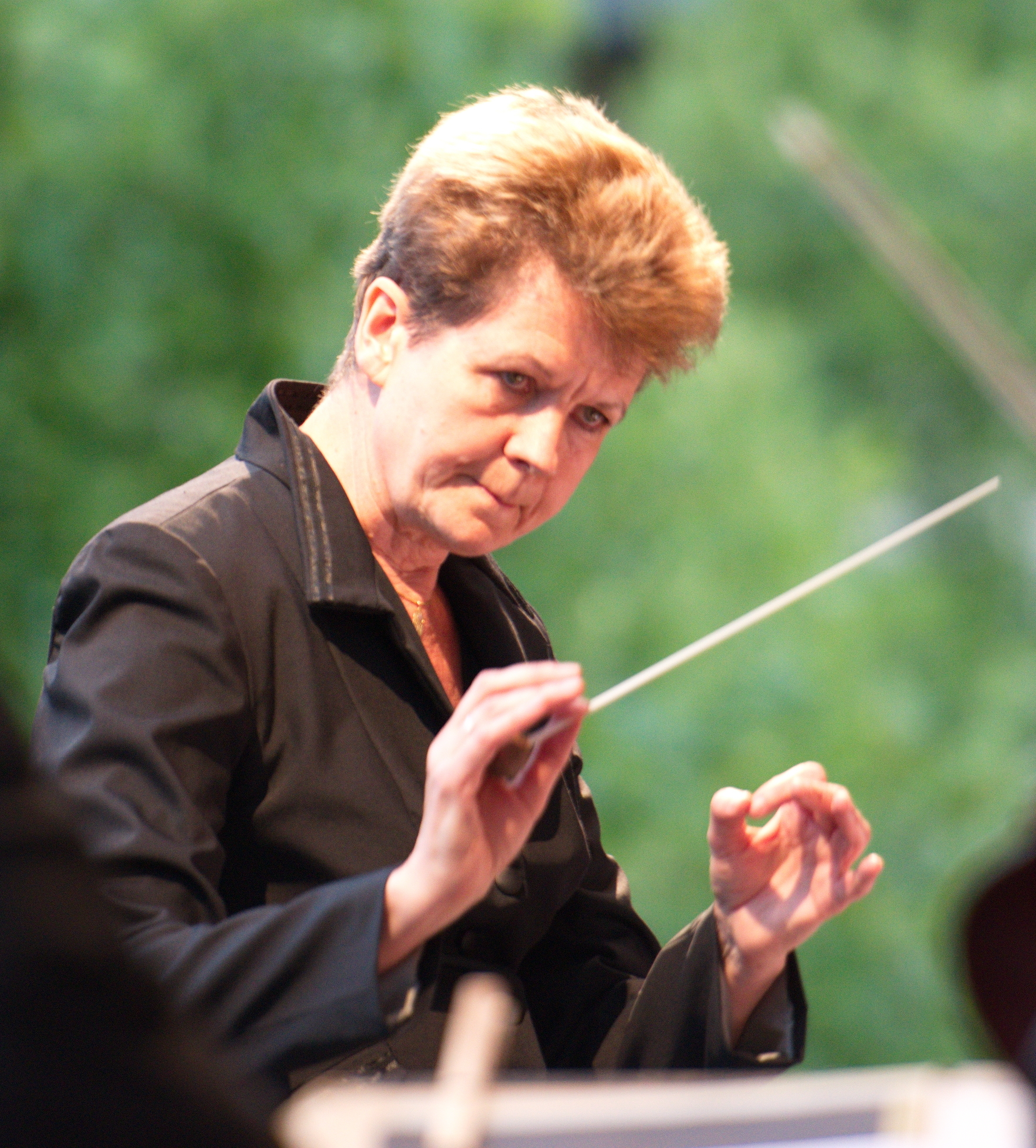
Jones in 2017

Julia Jones (born 28 April 1961) is a British conductor.

== Biography ==
Jones was born in Droitwich Spa, Worcestershire, England. She grew up on the Isle of Man, and attended the Chetham's School of Music, where she studied piano, clarinet, and singing. She continued her music studies at the University of Bristol, in conducting, piano, clarinet, and harpsichord, completing her B.A. Honours degree in 1983. She later studied at the Guildhall School of Music and Drama, where her teachers included Paul Hamburger and Gordon Black, and at the National Opera Studio. Her other conducting teachers included Moshe Atzmon, Miklós Erdélyi, Ferenc Nagy, and Erwin Acel.

Jones moved to Germany in her 20s to take up a post as a repetiteur at the Oper Köln. She has also been a repetiteur at the Staatsoper Stuttgart. From 1991 to 1995, she was a kapellmeisterin and assistant to GMD Alicja Mounk at the Ulm Municipal Theatre. From 1995 to 1997, she held a first kapellmeisterin post at the Staatstheater Darmstadt. From 1998 to 2002, she was principal conductor of the Basel Theatre/Basel Opera. Her original contract in Basel was through the summer of 2003, but she resigned in 2002 with immediate effect after reports of disputes with the musicians of the Sinfonieorchester Basel.

In 2008, Jones became principal conductor of the Orquestra Sinfónica Portuguesa at the Teatro Nacional de São Carlos, and held the post until 2011. Jones made her first guest conducting appearance at the Royal Opera, London, and her first professional guest conducting engagement in the UK, in January 2010, in the Covent Garden revival of Così fan tutte. In April 2016, she was named the next general music director (Generalmusikdirektorin) of the Wuppertal Symphony Orchestra (Sinfonieorchester Wuppertal), which also encompasses the music directorship of the Wuppertal Opera (Wuppertaler Bühnen). The first female conductor ever named to the Wuppertal posts, her initial contract was for 3 years, effective with the 2016–2017 season. In December 2020, Jones announced her intention to stand down from her posts in Wuppertal at the close of the 2020–2021 season.

Cultural offices
Preceded by Zoltán Peskó	Music Director, Orquestra Sinfónica Portuguesa; 2008–2011	Succeeded by Joana Carneiro
Preceded by Toshiyuki Kamioka	General Music Director (Generalmusikdirektorin), Wuppertal Opera and Wuppertal Symphony Orchestra; 2016–2021	Succeeded by Patrick Hahn
