= İlhan Baran =

Turkish composer (1934–2016)

İlhan Baran (1934, Artvin – 27 November 2016) was a Turkish composer.

Baran studied double bass and was a composition student of Ahmed Adnan Saygun at Ankara State Conservatory, graduating in 1960. He continued his studies in France at École Normale de Musique de Paris with Henri Dutilleux and Maurice Ohana. After returning to Turkey, he taught composition at the Ankara State Conservatory from 1964 to 2000.

== Selected works ==
Orchestra

- Töresel Çeşitlemeler (Modal Variations) (1980)

Chamber music

- Bir Bölümlü Sonatina (Sonatina in One Movement) for violin (or viola, or cello) and piano (1965)
- Yaylı Çalgılar Dördülü (String Quartet)
- Demet (Miracles) for flute, oboe, clarinet, horn and bassoon (1966–1967)
- Dönüşümler (Transformations) for violin, cello and piano (1975)
- Uygulamalar (Applications), Volumes I & II for double bass and piano
- Dört Zeybek (4 Zeybek Dances) for double bass and piano
- Dört Parça (4 Pieces) for 2 flutes

Keyboard

- Çocuk Parçaları (Children's Pieces) for piano or harpsichord (1984)
- Küçük Süit (Junior Suite) for piano
- Üç Soyut Dans (3 Abstract Dances) for piano
- Üç Bagatel (3 Bagatelles) for piano (1974)
- İki Sesli Sonatına (2 Audio Sonatinas) for piano
- Siyah Beyaz (Black and White) for piano
- Mavi Anadolu (Blue Anatolia) for piano (1999)

Choral

- Eylül Sonu (End of September) for mixed chorus
- Ezgi Demeti for mixed chorus
- Şarkılar (Songs) for mixed chorus
