= CSO Ada Ankara =

Musical campus in Ankara, Turkey

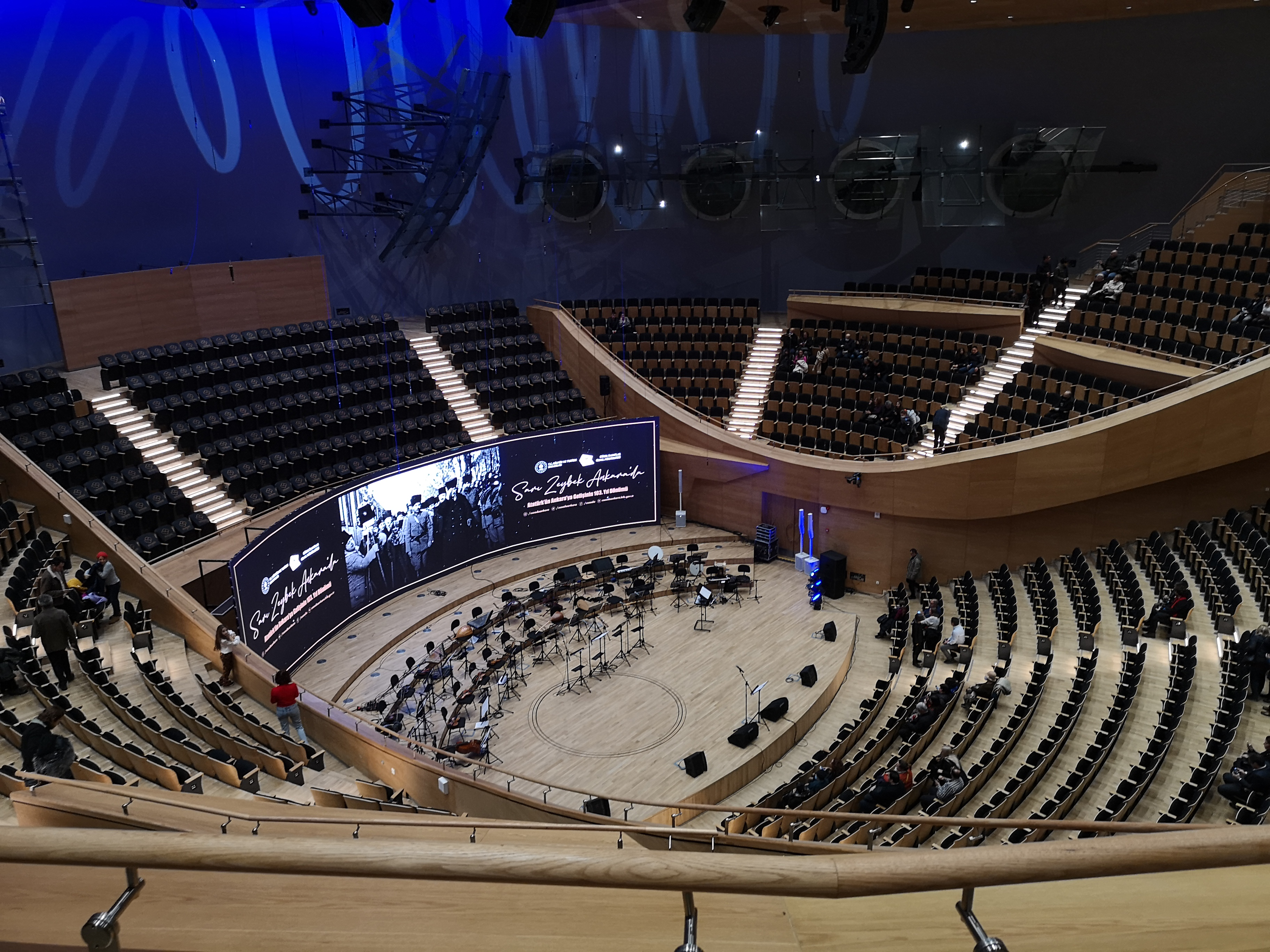
- Interactive map of CSO Ada Ankara
- Address: Talatpaşa Bulvarı, No: 38, 06330 Opera; 20457 Ankara, Turkey
- Capacity: 2,023
- Type: Concert hall

Construction
- Architects: Semra Uygur & Özcan Uygur

Website
- csoadaankara.ktb.gov.tr

CSO Ada Ankara (Presidential Symphony Orchestra Concert Hall, Turkish: CSO Konser Salonu) is the musical campus in Ankara, where the symphonic concert hall which hosts the Presidential Symphony Orchestra is located.

The complex houses 2023-seat CSO Main Hall, the 500-seat Blue Hall, the 650-seat old orchestra building (historical CSO), a 10000 capacity open-air concert area and the CSO Museum. It was designed by Semra and Özcan Uygur of Uygur Architects whose project was chosen among over forty-five other entries to the National Architectural Competition in 1992, constructed between 1995 and 2020. The project entailed construction of three air-formed membrane buildings. The main concert hall's air-formed membrane inflated in 2012.

Opened with gala concerts held on December 3, 4 and 5 and it became the first concert hall in the world to open after the Elbphilharmonie in Hamburg which was completed in 2017.

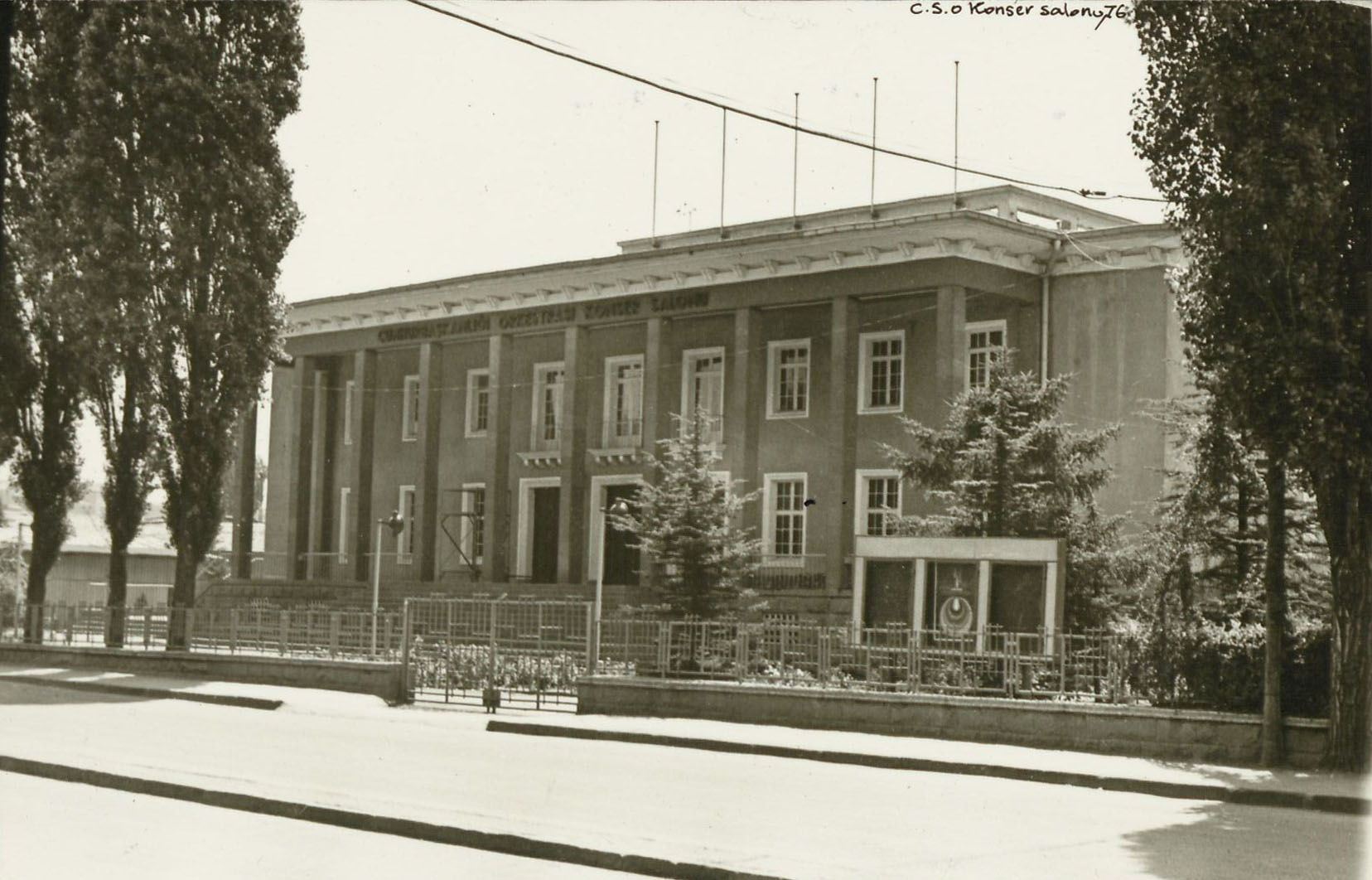
Historical building which was the home of the orchestra between 1961 and 2020

The venue constitutes an indoor area of 62,547 square meters and In addition to the Turkish Presidential Orchestra, hosts the State Polyphonic Choir, Turkic World Music Ensemble, State Classical Turkish Music Choir, State Turkish Folk Music Choir, and State Folk Dances Ensemble.

Located in a relatively abandoned urban landscape that sees both Anıtkabir and the historic Ankara Citadel; it symbolizes the dialogue of the premodern and modern-republican histories of the city established through the triangular prism foyer. In addition to foyer campus includes two more buildings: the egg-shaped dome designed as the Symphony Orchestra Hall and the sphere dome designed as Chamber Orchestra Hall.
