= İstemi =

- Gender: Male

Origin
- Language: Turkish
- Meaning: "Conqueror of the Sky"

Other names
- Related names: İstemihan

İstemi is not a common masculine Turkish given name. In Turkish, "İstemi" means "Conqueror of the Sky".

== Real People ==
- İstemi, the Yabgu (ruler) of the western part of the Göktürks, the Western Turkic Khaganate (Celestial Turks).
- İstemi Betil, a Turkish actor (see Turkish Wikipedia article).
