= Can Atilla =

Turkish musician

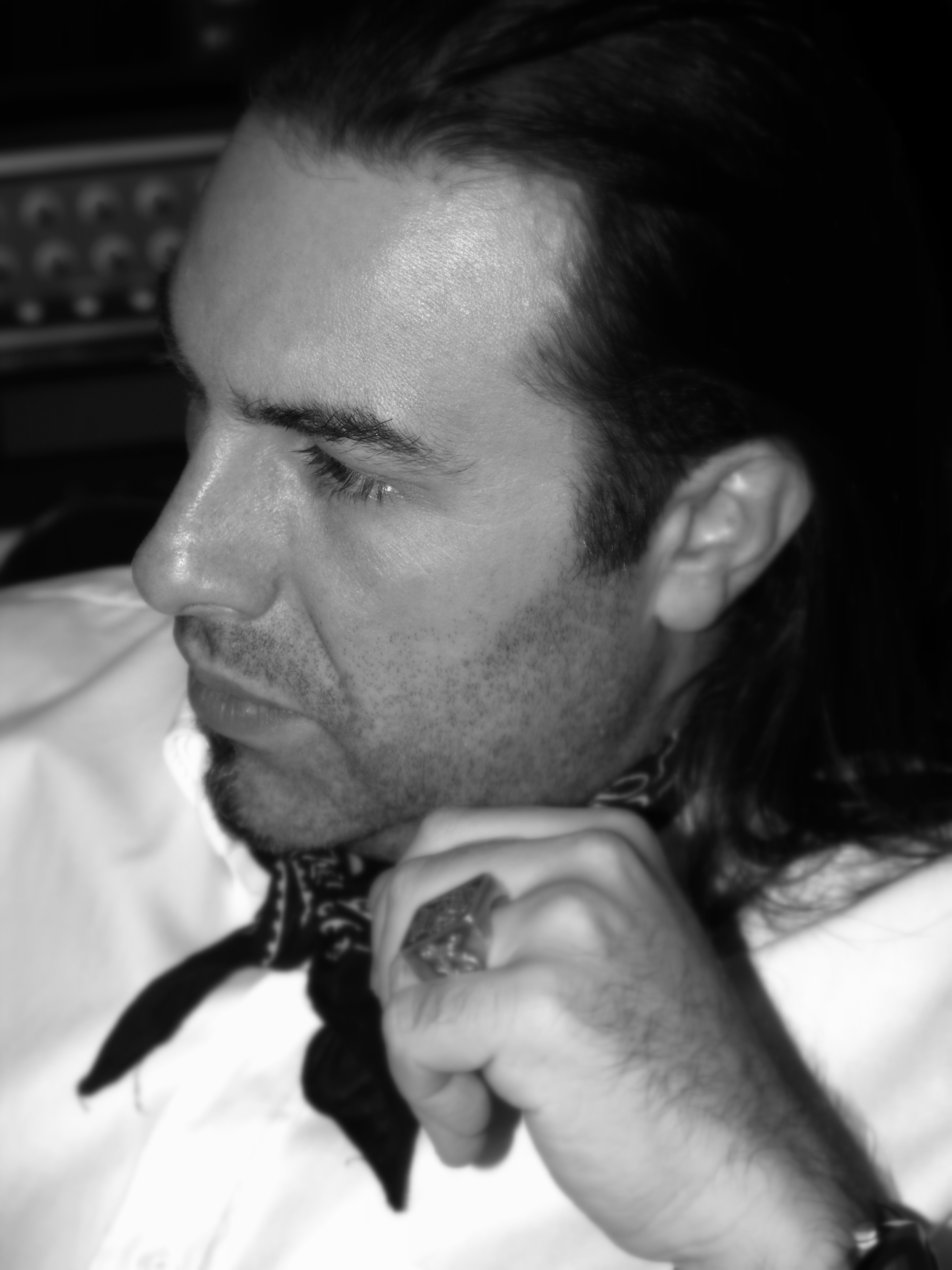

Background information
- Born: Ankara, Turkey
- Genres: New-age
- Instruments: Piano, synthesizer, keyboards, violin
- Labels: Sony BMG, Naxos
- Website: canatilla.com

Can Atilla (born 1969 in Ankara), is a Turkish musician and composer of electronic, ethnic, orchestral and new age music. Graduated from Hacettepe University Ankara State Conservatory in 1990 with a BA degree in violin, he has composed several studio albums as well as numerous scores for films, plays and television series. Although his earlier works fall in the category of electronic music, starting from mid 2000s he started to compose in more traditional style and gained reputation with his epic Empire Pentalogy, which consists of 5 Ottoman-era themed albums (Cariyeler ve Geceler, 1453 - Sultanlar Aşkına, Aşk-ı Hürrem, Altın Çağ, 1453 - Fatih Aşkına) that he produced during the years between 2005 and 2012. Can Atilla is widely regarded as a pioneer in Turkish electronic and new age music.

He composed "Diriliş" (Resurrection), the official music for the 90th anniversary of the Turkish parliament in 2010. In 2016, he composed 17 tracks for the musical stage play titled Kut al-Amara Dramatic Show with Documents. The play celebrates the 100th anniversary of the Ottoman victory over the British in the Siege of Kut during the First World War.

== Albums ==
- 1992: Bilinçaltı (Subconsciousness)
- 1996: Kuvayi Milliye Destanı (The Epic of Independence War)
- 1997: Efsaneler (Legends)
- 1998: Ave (In Memory of Tangerine Dream)
- 1999: Albatros
- 2001: St. Florian, Dramatic Poem for Large Orchestra and Organ in memory of Anton Bruckner
- 2003: Waves of Wheels (Extended - Remastered Edition)
- 2003: Live
- 2004: Omni
- 2005: Concorde
- 2005: Cariyeler ve Geceler (Concubines and Nights)
- 2006: 1453 - Sultanlar Aşkına (1453 - For the Sultans' Sake)
- 2007: Aşk-ı Hürrem (The Love of Hürrem)
- 2008: Efsaneler (Legends)
- 2008: Mevlana'dan Çağrı (Rumi's Call)
- 2010: Altın Çağ (The Golden Age)
- 2011: Hi-Story
- 2011: TED 80. Yıl Oratoryosu
- 2012: 1453 - Fatih Aşkına
- 2013: Çanakkale 1915
- 2013: Leyla ile Mecnun
- 2013: IDEA
- 2014: Aşkın Gücü (Live at Congresium)
- 2015: Hüzn'ü Diyar Kerbela
- 2016: Can-ı Yunus
- 2017: Symphony No.2 in C minor, Gallipoli – The 57th Regiment
- 2017: Şems-i Rumi
- 2017: Hüzn-ü Diyar Kerbela
- 2017: Cariyeler ve Geceler
- 2018: Gönderilmemiş Aşk Mektupları/Şubat
- 2018: Berlin High School Legacy
- 2019: Can Atilla's Masiva (Electronic Rock Experience)
- 2021: Mahrem (Soundtrack)
- 2021: Çilehane
- 2022: Nazım Hikmet 120 Yaşında (Soundtrack)
- 2022: Resital (Solo Piano)
- 2022: Le Visage (Tribute to Jean Michel Jarre)
- 2024: MEHMED FETİHLER SULTANI (Season 1)
- 2024: MEHMED FETİHLER SULTANI (Season 2)
