= Kamil Sönmez =

- Born: March 4, 1947; Perşembe, Ordu
- Origin: Black Sea Region
- Died: 20 December 2012 (aged 65) Şişli, Istanbul, Turkey
- Genres: Turkish folk music
- Occupations: Singer, Actor
- Instrument: Vocals

Kamil Sönmez (4 March 1947 – 20 December 2012) was a Turkish folk singer and actor. He is best known for his folk songs from the Black Sea Region of Turkey.

In 1998, he received the title of "state artist".

He suffered a cerebral hemorrhage on 4 December 2012 and died on 20 December 2012 in Başkent University Istanbul Medical Practice and Research Center.

== Filmography ==
=== Movies ===
- 1979 Düşman
- 1980 Eşek Şakası
- 1981 Deli Kan
- 1981 Bizim Sokak
- 1984 Sev Ölesiye
- 1985 Cilalı İbo Beni Anneme Götür
- 1987 Islak Sokak
- 1991 Bir Kadın Düşmanı
- 2006 Amerikalılar Karadeniz'de 2
- 2009 Güneşi Gördüm

=== TV series ===
- 1993 Bizim Mahalle, Kamil
- 2000 Tirvana
- 2002 Kumsaldaki İzler, Hüseyin
- 2002 Kınalı Kar, Kamil
- 2003 Ölümsüz Aşk, Naci
- 2005 Sensiz Olmuyor, Osman Reis
- 2006 Karagümrük Yanıyor, Kurban
- 2006 Sev Kardeşim, Ahmet Kalabık
- 2007 Komedi Dükkanı
- 2008 Aşkım Aşkım, Osman
- 2008 Küçük Kadınlar
- 2009 Hırçın Kız Kadife
