= İstemihan =

- Gender: Male

Origin
- Language: Turkish
- Meaning: "Conquerror of the Sky", "Ruler of the Sky"

Other names
- Related names: İstemi

İstemihan is a common masculine Turkish given name. It is composed of two Turkish words: "İstemi" and "Han". "İstemi" means "Conquerror of the Sky" and it is a given name on its own whereas "Han" means "Ruler" or "King". Thus, "İstemihan" means "Conquerror of the Sky" or "Ruler of the Sky".

== People ==
- İstemihan Kapar, a Turkish author (see Turkish Wikipedia article).
- İstemi Khan, the Yabgu (ruler) of the western part of the Göktürks, the Western Turkic Khaganate (Celestial Turks).
- İstemihan Taviloğlu, a Turkish composer and a music educator.
- İstemihan Talay, former Minister of Culture of Turkey .
