= Atilla Manizade =

Turkish opera singer (1945–2016)

Atilla Manizade (1945 – 10 July 2016) was a Turkish Cypriot opera singer (bass). He was praised as an artist of great versatility. He had an extensive repertoire of more than forty operas, ranging from dramatic roles to buffo parts. Manizade was also a distinguished member of the State Conservatory of Istanbul Technical University.

== Biography ==
Born in Cyprus, Manizade began studying music whilst studying architecture at the Istanbul Technical University. Following his graduation, he continued his musical studies in Germany and specialized in German opera.

In 1960, Manizade returned to Istanbul where he made his debut at the opening night of the Istanbul State Opera, and became the leading bass soloist. In the 1980s he was the Artistic Director and General Manager of the Istanbul State Opera and Ballet.

Manizade was also a member of the Department of Music Faculty at the Eastern Mediterranean University. He died on 10 July 2016.

== Awards ==
Manizade was awarded the honorary title of State Artist by the government of Turkey for his contributions to Turkish culture in 1998.
