= Selman Ada =

Turkish composer, pianist and conductor

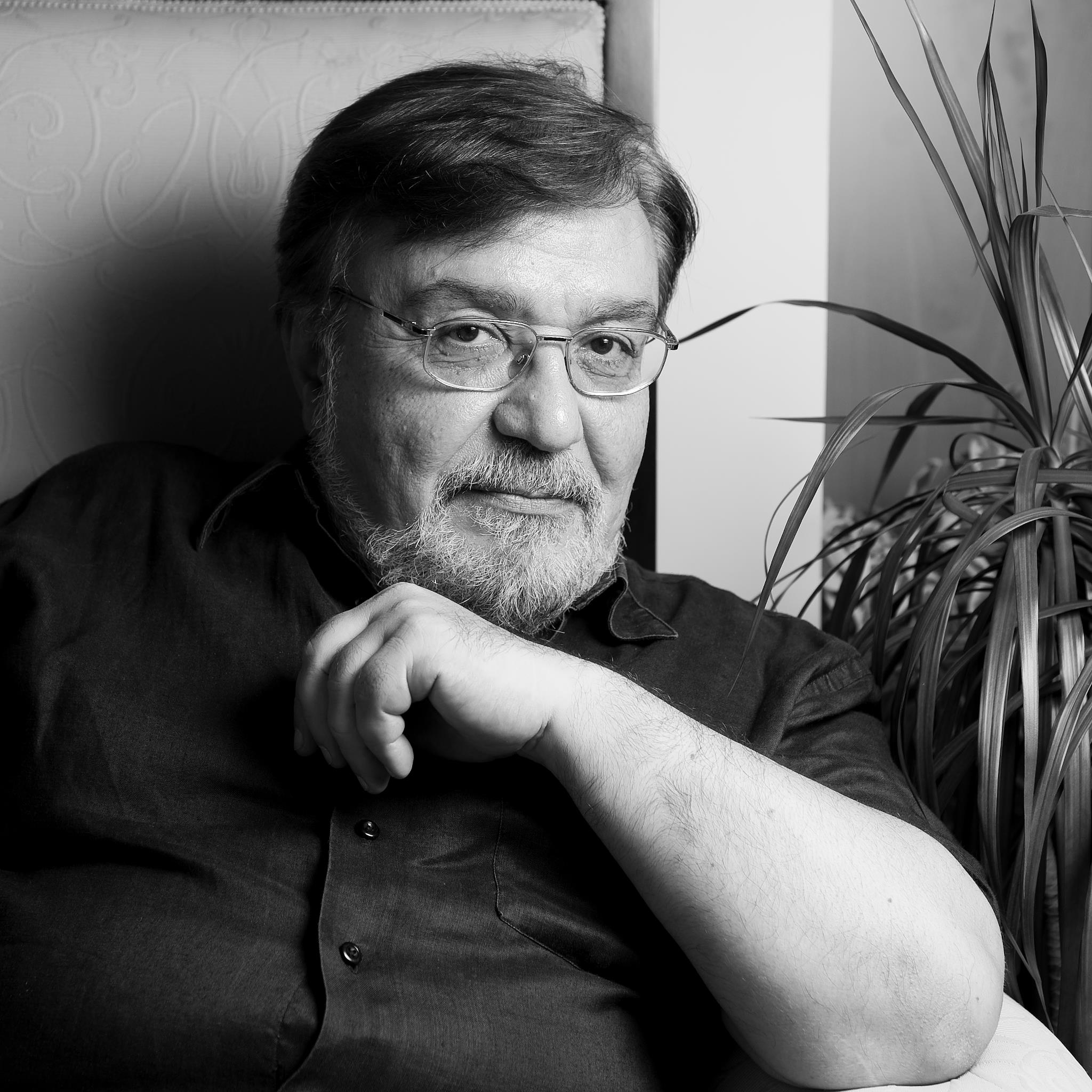
- 2012, Through the Lens of Filiz Tülü.
- Born: February 24, 1953 (age 71); Ceyhan, Adana
- Relatives: Composer

Selman Ada (born February 24, 1953, Ceyhan) is a Turkish composer, conductor and pianist. When he started to conduct the Istanbul Opera Orchestra in 1973 at the age of 20, he went down in history as "the youngest opera conductor in the world".

== Early years ==
He was born in 1953 in Ceyhan. He started music as a student of Ferdi Ştatzer and Mithat Fenmen. In 1973, he started to work as an assistant and student of General Music Director Robert Wagner at the Istanbul State Opera and Ballet.

== Works ==
=== Operas ===
- “Ali Baba ve 40 Haramiler” Opera in 2 acts (libretto: Tarık Günersel, 1990, Strube Verlag München-Berlin)
- “Aşk-ı Memnu” Opera in 2 acts (libretto: Tarık Günersel, 2002, Strube Verlag München-Berlin)

=== Piano works ===
- "Piyano İçin Kırk Haramiler" (1960)
- "Piyano İçin Köçekçe" (1964)
- "Piyano İçin 5 Parça" (1965, Strube Verlag München-Berlin)
- "Köye Doğru" (1967, Strube Verlag München-Berlin)
- “Nişabur” (1973, Strube Verlag München-Berlin)
- "12 Amodal Prelüd" (1980–1991, Strube Verlag München-Berlin)
- “Asimagies” (1994, Strube Verlag München-Berlin)
- “5 Etüd” (1998, Strube Verlag München-Berlin)
- “Rhapsodie” (1998, Strube Verlag München-Berlin)
- “Jeux de piano” (2000, Strube Verlag München-Berlin)
- “Deutsche Volksliederbuch für Klavier” (2003, Strube Verlag München-Berlin)
- “Three Instantaneous” (2004, Strube Verlag München-Berlin)
- “Mini Piano” (2004, Strube Verlag München-Berlin)

=== Chamber music works ===
- “3 Avrasyalı” (1994, Edition Zurfluh Paris, Strube Verlag München-Berlin)
- “Valse Charmante” (1999, Strube Verlag München-Berlin)
- “Karciğar Oyun Havası'2” (2001, Strube Verlag München-Berlin)
- “Süit” (2001, Strube Verlag München-Berlin)
- “2 Konser Prelüdü” (2 Concert Preludes) for flute, viola and harp (2002, Strube Verlag München-Berlin)
- “Drei Konzertstücke” for 2 trumpets (2003, Strube Verlag München-Berlin)
- “Der Eurhythmus” for flute and piano (2003, Strube Verlag München-Berlin).
- “Blech-Quartett” for trumpet, horn, trombone and tuba (2003, Strube Verlag München-Berlin)
- “Kleine Jazz Süite" for string quartet (2003, Strube Verlag München-Berlin)
- “4 Préludes pour Guitare” (2003, Strube Verlag München-Berlin)
- “Drei Byzantynische Tänze“ for clarinet and piano (2003, Strube Verlag München-Berlin).

=== Choral works ===
- “Yemen Türküsü” (2002, Strube Verlag München-Berlin).
- “Rast Semai” (2002, Strube Verlag München-Berlin).
- “Gidelim Göksu’ya” (2002, Strube Verlag München-Berlin)
- “Vatan Marşı” (2006)

=== Symphonic works ===
- “40 Haramiler Uvertürü” (1990)
- “2 Raks'2” (1990)
- “Symphony” (2004)

=== Oratorio/orchestra works ===
- “Mavi Nokta” Poetik Opera (9 Bölüm, libretto: Tarık Günersel, 1995, Strube Verlag München-Berlin)
- “Ballade” For Mezzo Soprano and Small Orchestra (2004, Poem: Gülseli İnal: “Yapayalnızsın”)
