= Carlo Tenan =

Turkish conductor (born 1969)

- Born: 1969 (age 56–57); Italy
- Education: [Bologna -Conservatory of Music Giovan Battista Martini]
- Occupations: Conductor, composer
- Website: https://carlotenan.com/

Carlo Tenan (born 1969) is an Italian conductor and composer. He has been the principal conductor and artistic director of the Borusan Istanbul Philharmonic Orchestra since 2023.

== Early life and education ==
Carlo Tenan was born in 1969 in Italy. He received training in piano and oboe, as well as in composition, electronic music, and orchestral conducting. He began his career as an assistant to conductors such as Mstislav Rostropovich, Sir Antonio Pappano, and Lorin Maazel.

== Career ==
Tenan has conducted various international orchestras, including the Accademia Nazionale di Santa Cecilia, Tokyo Philharmonic Orchestra, Konzerthaus Berlin, Teatro del Maggio Musicale Fiorentino, Teatro Comunale di Bologna, and Orchestra Verdi di Milano. In 2010, he conducted the New Year's Concert at the Grosses Festspielhaus in Salzburg.

In opera, he has conducted works such as Mozart's Die Entführung aus dem Serail and Don Giovanni, as well as Giacomo Puccini's Tosca and La bohème. He has also worked in contemporary music and collaborated with Ludovico Einaudi. In 2023, he was appointed artistic director and principal conductor of the Borusan Istanbul Philharmonic Orchestra. In this role, he conducted concerts with the orchestra during a United Kingdom tour in Perth, Edinburgh, London, Guildford, and Sheffield in April 2025.

As a composer, Tenan's works have received awards in various international competitions. Some of these compositions include "4.0" for wind sextet, "Musica per Quartetto d’Arpe", and Kammerkonzert for piano and big band.

== Awards ==
- 2008: Concorso "Opera J"
- 2008: "2 Agosto" International Composition Competition
- 2009: International Uuno Klami Composition Competition
- 2014: Bangor Dylan Thomas Electroacoustic Composition Award (Finalist)
- 2015: UnTwelve Composition Competition

== Personal life ==
He often comes in Istanbul due to his position with Borusan Istanbul Philharmonic Orchestra. He has stated that he has a habit of drinking Turkish coffee before concerts and that it provides him with energy. Musically, he has an interest in folk songs, particularly Turkish folk music, and incorporates these melodies into his compositions.
