= Meriç Sümen =

- Born: 25 May 1943 (age 83); Silivri, Turkey
- Education: Ankara State Conservatory
- Occupations: Ballerina, civil servant
- Years active: 1961–2007
- Spouses: Kayhan Bakan; Önaç Kanan (m. 1996)
- Children: 1

Meriç Sümen (born 25 May 1943) is a Turkish former ballerina and a choreographer.

== Life ==
Meriç Sümen was born at Silivri, Turkey in 1943. She completed the ballet section of Ankara State Conservatory in 1961. She began a dancing career in the Ankara Opera House. In addition to her ballet career, she often served in the administrative body. She was the art director between 1979 and 1986 in Ankara, between 1986-1989 and 2000–2002 in Istanbul ballets. On 5 July 2005, she was appointed director general of the Turkish State Opera and Ballet She retired on 15 October 2007.

She is married and the mother of a son named Tunca, who is also a ballet dancer.

== Career ==
In the early years, she gained fame in her performance in the romantic ballet Giselle. She performed Giselle in Sofia, Bulgaria and Moscow, the Soviet Union. She was the first ever foreign prima ballerina in Bolshoi Ballet. She also took part in many ballets in Leningrad, Kiew, Minsk, Riga and Odessa, all then in the former Soviet Union. In later years, she also performed in the United States, Great Britain, Japan, Italy, the Netherlands, Poland, former Yugoslavia, Germany, Bulgaria, Algeria, Egypt, Tunis, Pakistan and Denmark. In 1983–1984, she obtained a teaching certificate from the Bolshoi. In 1998, she taught in Texas Ballet Theater. Many times in International ballet competitions, she took part in the jury.

== Legacy ==
In 1981, she was awarded the honorary title State Artist. So far she is the only ballet dancer to gain this title. In 2010, Nevsal Baylas wrote a book about Meriç Sümen titled Dansa Aşık Bir Kuğu ("The Swan who fell in love with Dance") .

== Her performances ==
- Swan Lake
- Giselle
- Nutcracker
- Sleeping Beauty
- Romeo & Juliet
- Don Quixote
- La fille mal gardée
- Judith
- Ferhat & Şirin
- Bahçesaray Fountain
- Scheherazade
- Le Sylphides
- La Patinuers
- Çeşme Başı
- Prince in Pagodas
- Beauty & Beast
- Three Sisters
- Orpheus
- Blood Wedding
- Pas De Quatre
- A Woman Called Rosy
- La Bayadere
- Paquita
- Sylvia
- Faust
- The Lady with the Dagger
- La Symphonie Fantastique
- Petrushka
- Le Spectre de La Rose
- Esmeralda
- La Traviata.
