= Ilarion Ionescu-Galați =

Romanian violinist and orchestra conductor

- Born: 17 September 1937 (age 88); Iași
- Occupations: violinist and orchestra conductor
- Known for: Conductor of the Philharmonic Orchestra in Braşov; Permanent conductor and Honorary Director of the Ploieşti Philharmonic Orchestra

Ilarion Ionescu-Galați (born 17 September 1937) is a Romanian violinist and orchestra conductor.

== Early years ==
Born in Iași, he started to study music with his father (an amateur musician). He graduated from the Music Conservatory in Bucharest and became a well-known violinist, performing in concerts all over Romania and also abroad. Having decided to become a conductor, he was granted a scholarship in the field, to École Normale de Musique in Paris, France, where he studied with Pierre Dervaux. Following that, he studied in the United States with Eugene Ormandy and Leopold Stokowski.

== Career ==
Back in Romania, Ionescu-Galați became the conductor of the Philharmonic Orchestra in Braşov. He also conducted many orchestras in Romania and many others from the United States, Japan, People's Republic of China, Italy, France, Germany, Austria, Sweden (he was permanent conductor at Gävle Symphony Orchestra), Russia, Mongolia, Spain, Greece, Turkey (he was the permanent conductor and artistic director at Istanbul State Symphony Orchestra and also permanent conductor at Ankara Symphony Orchestra and Bilkent Symphony Orchestra). He taught conducting classes and violin classes in the United States, Romania, Greece and Turkey.

Ilarion Ionescu-Galați played with soloists such as Lazar Berman, Radu Lupu, Fazıl Say, Josu de Solaun Soto, Felicia Filip, Daniil Shafran, Igor Oistrakh, Valery Oistrach, Viktor Pikaisen, Rudolf Kerrer, Ion Voicu, Magda Tagliaferro, İdil Biret, Ayla Erduran, Sabine Meyer, Costas Cotsiolis, Aris Garoufalis, Theodore Kerkezos and several others. His discography contains many titles including Gioachino Rossini (all Sei sonate a quattro), Pyotr Ilyich Tchaikovsky (Fifth Symphony), and Antonín Dvořák (Seventh Symphony, with the Tokyo Symphonic Orchestra), Niccolò Paganini, Ludwig van Beethoven, Wolfgang Amadeus Mozart, Camille Saint-Saëns, and Franz Liszt.

After leaving Braşov Philharmonic Orchestra, he became permanent conductor and Honorary Director of the Ploieşti Philharmonic Orchestra.

== Recognition ==
He received medals, honors and assorted prizes and diplomas in Romania, Turkey, Greece and several other countries. In 2008 the pianist Ioana Maria Lupascu wrote a non-fiction book, in which Ionescu-Galați is the main character.
