= Mesude Çağlayan =

Turkish opera singer (1918–2011)

- Born: 1918; Edirne, Ottoman Empire
- Died: 31 July 2011 (aged 92–93); Ankara, Turkey
- Occupation: Operatic soprano
- Years active: 1942–1981

Mesude Çağlayan (1918 – 31 July 2011) was a Turkish operatic soprano.

== Early life ==
Mesude was born in Edirne, Ottoman Empire, in 1918. She obtained her surname "Çağlayan" later. She studied opera at Ankara State Conservatory, and graduated in 1942.

== Opera career ==
On 21 June 1940, the Ankara Halkevi ("Community Center of Ankara") staged its first opera, Mozart's one-act singspiel Bastien und Bastienne. In the following performance that night, in the second act of Puccini's Madama Butterfly, Çağlayan made her stage debut as Cio-Cio-san.

In 1942, she performed in the complete Madama Butterfly, together with professionals who were educated in Europe. She was one of the pioneers of opera in Turkey. She then starred in many performances over a long time, including the title role in Smetana's The Bartered Bride in 1943, Mozart's The Marriage of Figaro in 1944, Gilda in Verdi's Rigoletto in 1950, Menotti's The Consul in 1952, and Bizet's Carmen in 1957. On 9 June 1981, she retired from the Ankara State Opera, where she started her professional career on 1 July 1949.

== Recognition ==
The Japanese government honored Çağlayan by presenting her a tiny Madama Butterfly doll for her successful performance in the opera. The kimono she wore in the performance and the baby doll have been on display in the upper lobby of the Ankara Opera building since 2008. In 2009, Minister of Culture and Tourism Ertuğrul Günay visited her in the nursing home where she lived, and presented her a gold medal award prepared on the occasion of the 60th anniversary of the establishment of the Turkish State Opera and Ballet and Turkish State Theatres for the artists who served for many years.

== Death ==
Mesude Çağlayan died aged 93 in Ankara on 31 July 2011.
