= Patrick Hahn =

Austrian conductor, pianist and composer (born 1995)

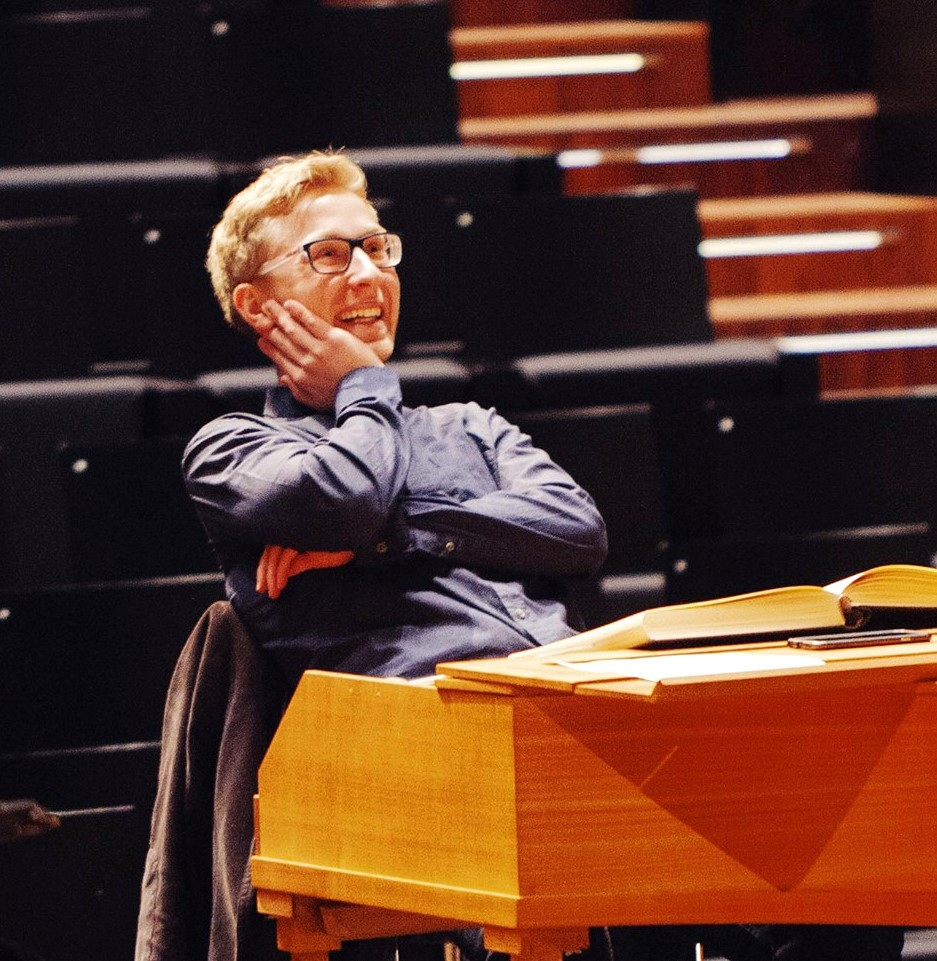
Patrick Hahn (2018)

Patrick Hahn (born 17 July 1995 in Graz) is an Austrian conductor, pianist and composer.

== Biography ==
Hahn began his musical education as a treble soloist with the Graz Boys Choir and led him at age 11 to study piano at the University of Music and Performing Arts Graz, where he also completed his studies in conducting and correpetition. He comes from a non-musical family. He has taken part in Masterclasses with Kurt Masur and Bernard Haitink and was a Conducting Fellow at both the Aspen Music Festival as well as the Tanglewood Music Center. He served as assistant conductor to Kirill Petrenko for the 2019 new productions of Salome and Die Tote Stadt at the Bavarian State Opera, as well as Fidelio at Festspielhaus Baden-Baden.

Hahn gave his professional debut as a conductor in 2014 with the Orchestra of the Hungarian State Opera in Budapest sharing the stage with Piotr Beczała and Ferruccio Furlanetto at a gala concert on the occasion of the 25th anniversary of the opening of the Austrian-Hungarian border. For the 2017–2018 season, Hahn was a repetiteur at the Hamburg State Opera. Within the field of contemporary music, he has a close relationship with Klangforum Wien.

With the 2021–2022 season, Hahn became Generalmusikdirektor (GMD) of the Wuppertaler Bühnen und Sinfonieorchester GmbH, then the youngest general music director in Germany. That same season Hahn also became principal guest conductor of the Munich Radio Orchestra, the first such titled conductor in the orchestra's history. From 2021 to 2023, he served as principal guest conductor and artistic advisor of the Borusan Istanbul Philharmonic Orchestra. In December 2022, the Wuppertaler Bühnen und Sinfonieorchester GmbH announced the extension of his initial 3-year contract for an additional two years, through the 2025–2026 season. Hahn is scheduled to conclude his Wuppertaler Bühnen und Sinfonieorchester GmbH tenure at the close of the 2025–2026 season.

In 2022, Hahn first guest-conducted the Royal Scottish National Orchestra (RSNO), as an emergency substitute conductor. In March 2024, the RSNO announced the appointment of Hahn as its next principal guest conductor, effective with the 2024–2025 season.

== Other activities ==
Continuous contact with the field of opera as a treble soloist led him to write his first composition at the age of 12 – the opera "Die Frittatensuppe", which was premiered in 2008 under his direction in Graz. In 2013, he was awarded the 2nd prize at the Penfield Music Commission Project Contest (New York, USA). As a composer and arranger he has published music with Tierolff Muziekcentrale (Roosendaal, the Netherlands) as well as Helbling (Rum/Innsbruck).

Aside from his work in classical music, Hahn has a keen interest in both cabaret-songs by the Austrian satirist and composer Georg Kreisler as well as in jazz music, having received awards as a pianist at jazz festivals in Chicago and the "Outstanding Soloist Award" from the University of Wisconsin–La Crosse as the best jazz pianist of its 37th Annual Jazz Festival.

== Discography ==
- Beethoven: Piano Concertos 1 & 2. Olivier Cavé, Kammerakademie Potsdam, conductor: Patrick Hahn (Alpha, 2020).
- Stańczyk: Mosaïque. Klangforum Wien, conductor: Patrick Hahn (Kairos, 2021).
- Ullmann: Der Kaiser von Atlantis. Adrian Eröd, Lars Woldt, Johannes Chum, Juliana Zara, Tareq Nazmi, Christel Loetzsch, Munich Radio Orchestra, conductor: Patrick Hahn (BR-Klassik, 2022).
- Wülker: Continuum. Nils Wülker, Munich Radio Orchestra, conductor: Patrick Hahn (Warner, 2022).
- Britten & Bruch: Violin Concertos. Kerson Leong, Philharmonia Orchestra, conductor: Patrick Hahn (Alpha, 2023).

Cultural offices
Preceded by Julia Jones	Generalmusikdirektor, Wuppertal Opera and Wuppertal Symphony Orchestra; 2021–present	Succeeded by incumbent
