= Hacettepe Symphony Orchestra =

The Hacettepe Symphony Orchestra (Hacettepe Senfoni Orkestrası) is an orchestra based in Ankara, Turkey. It was founded in 2003 and is currently conducted by Erol Erdinç.
