= Toshiyuki Kamioka =

Japanese conductor and pianist (born 1960)

- Born: 20 September 1960 (age 65); Tokyo, Japan
- Education: Tokyo National University of Fine Arts and Music; Hochschule für Musik und Theater Hamburg
- Occupations: Conductor; Pianist
- Organizations: Hessisches Staatstheater Wiesbaden; Nordwestdeutsche Philharmonie; Opernhaus Wuppertal
- Awards: Von der Heydt Prize

Toshiyuki Kamioka Kamioka Toshiyuki (上岡 敏之; born 20 September 1960) is a Japanese conductor and pianist, who lives and works predominantly in Germany since 1984.

== Career ==
Born in Tokyo, Toshiyuki Kamioka studied from 1979 to 1983 conducting, composition, piano and violin at the Tokyo National University of Fine Arts and Music, where he was awarded the Ataka prize in 1982. A scholarship of Rotary International enabled him to continue his studies at the Hochschule für Musik und Theater Hamburg with Klauspeter Seibel.

After positions in Kiel and at the Aalto Theatre in Essen Kamioka was appointed Generalmusikdirektor at the Hessisches Staatstheater Wiesbaden in 1996, where he worked until 2004. From 1998 to 2006 he was also Generalmusikdirektor of the Nordwestdeutsche Philharmonie in Herford. In January 2000 he conducted them in Einojuhani Rautavaara's Symphony No.7 (Angel of Light) in Detmold, Paderborn, Herford, Bad Salzuflen and Minden.

Since 2004 Kamioka has been Generalmusikdirektor of Wuppertal, from 2012 also conductor of the Opernhaus Wuppertal, and a professor for conducting at the Hochschule für Musik Saar in Saarbrücken. Since 2009 he has been also Generalmusikdirektor at the Saarländisches Staatstheater.

Kamioka has conducted as a guest the NHK Symphony Orchestra, the Bamberg Symphony and German radio orchestras.

In 2010 he was awarded the Von der Heydt Prize of the city of Wuppertal as conductor of the Symphony Orchestra Wuppertal.
