= Hacettepe University Ankara State Conservatory =

First conservatory to be founded in the Republic of Türkiye

- Hacettepe Üniversitesi Ankara Devlet Konservatuvarı
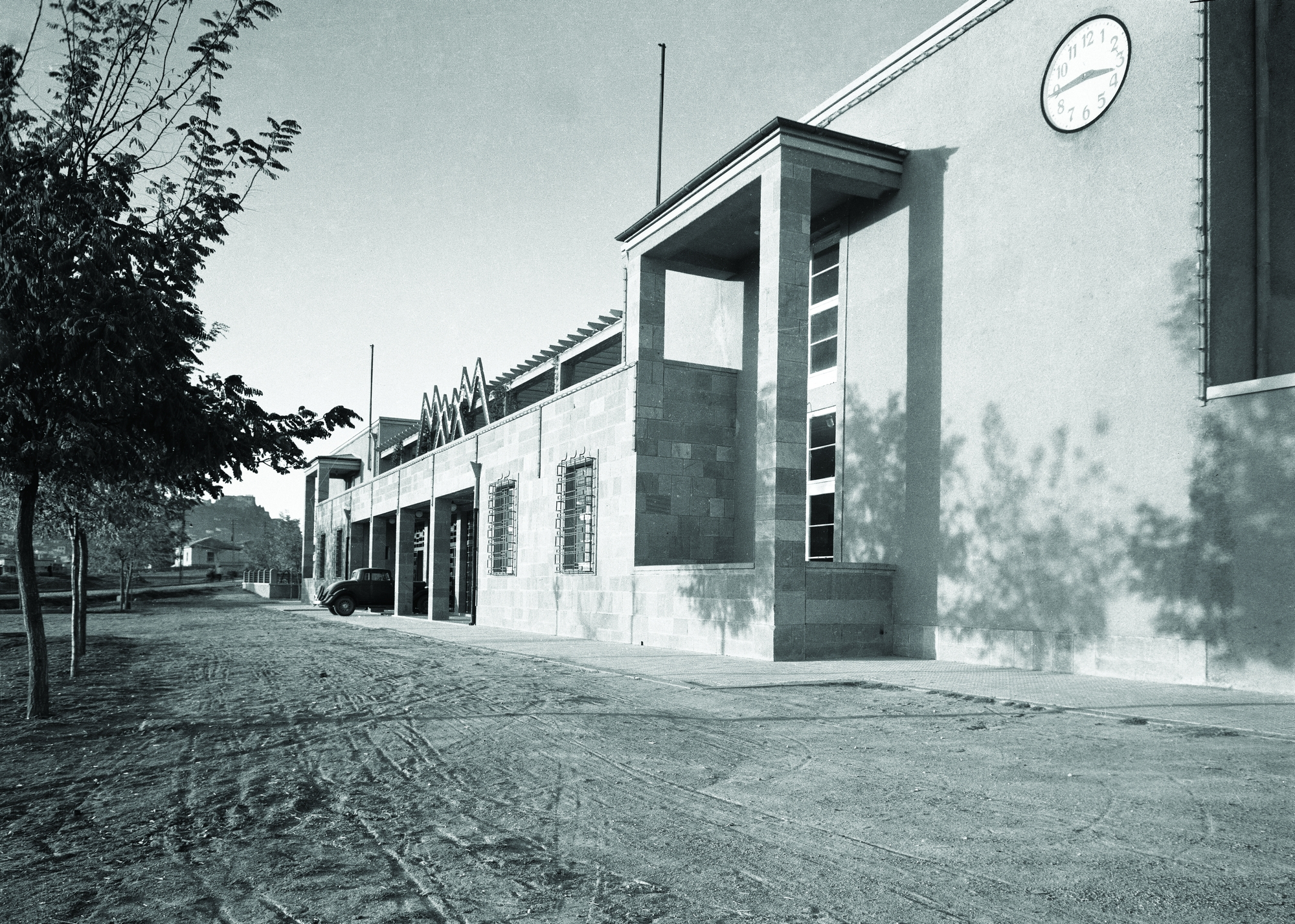
- Ankara State Conservatory (formerly School of Music Teachers).
- Former names: Ankara State Conservatory
- Type: Conservatory
- Established: 1936; 90 years ago; 1982 (affiliated)
- Founders: Mustafa Kemal Atatürk
- Affiliations: Hacettepe University
- Academic staff: 166
- Administrative staff: 30
- Location: Üniversiteler Mah., Beytepe Campus, Ankara, 06800, Turkey; 39.876942°N 32.728271°E
- Campus: Beytepe Campus
- Website: www.konser.hacettepe.edu.tr

The Hacettepe University Ankara State Conservatory (Turkish: Hacettepe Üniversitesi Ankara Devlet Konservatuvarı), the first conservatory to be founded in the Republic of Turkey, was established in 1936 by a directive of Mustafa Kemal Atatürk.

The conservatory is part of Hacettepe University.

== History ==
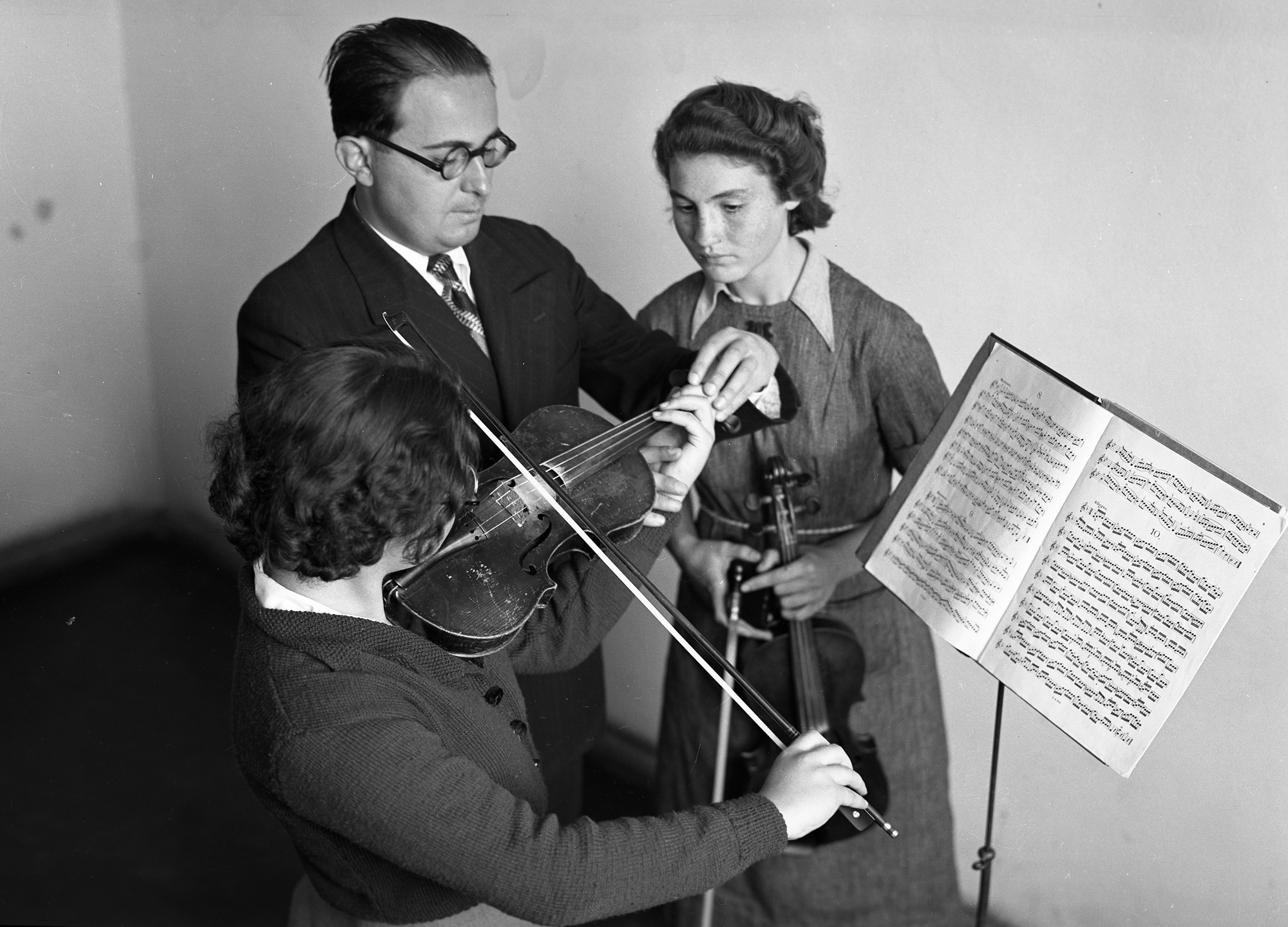
Violin teaching class with teacher (mid) and two female students.

=== School of Music Teachers (1924–1936) ===
The roots of the Ankara State Conservatory goes to the School of Music Teachers (Ottoman Turkish: Mûsikî Mu'allim Mektebi), which was established in Ankara by the order of President Mustafa Kemal Atatürk under the Ministry of Education to train music teachers for secondary schools in 1924 right after the proclamation of the Republic. The students were educated in besides music and French language also in other lessons such as Turkish language, history and biology. The teachers were member of the Presidential Symphony Orchestra (Ottoman Turkish: Riyâset-i Cumhûr Mûsikî Hey'eti), later named Turkish: Cumhurbaşkanlığı Senfoni Orkestrası). Starting from 1925, students such as Ulvi Cemal Erkin, Ahmet Adnan Saygun and Necil Kazım Akses, who were sent to Europe on state scholarships for music education, served as faculty at the school after their return home. Inıtially, a hotel in Cebeci quarter of ANkara consisting of three houses built of mudbricks was used as the school building.

In 1928, it was decided to replace this buildings, whose physical facilities could not meet the increasing needs and crowded population, with a new building after its demolition. The new school building was designed by the Austrian-Swiss architect Ernst Arnold Egli (1893–1974), and completed in 1929. It consisted of a concert hall and lobby, a dining hall, dormitory and study rooms in addition to classrooms. Education continued until 1985 in the building, which was expanded with new spaces.

=== Establishment of the conservatory (1933–1936) ===
In 1933, a bill was prepared on the "National Music and Theatre" by a commission consisting of the school principal Osman Zeki Üngör (1880–1958) and teachers led by the Minister of Education Hikmet Bayur (1891–1980). It aimed the establishment of an institution called the "State Music Conservatory" or "Theater Academy" to cover all music branches in order to meet all kinds of music needs. It was envisaged that this institution would be structured as an academy consisting of the Music Teachers School, the Presidential Philharmonic Orchestra and the Theatre Department. The bill was enacted in 1934. Thereupon, the students' inspector of the Turkish Government in Berlin, Germany was tasked to find an expert to consult during the implementation of the project. An agreement was signed with German composer and musicologist Paul Hindemith (1895–1963) for the realization the project.

Hindemith went to Turkey several times intermittently between 1935 and 1937, prepared a detailed report consisting of sixteen chapters, and oversaw the implementation of his proposals and designs. It was decided that the institution to be established would include a school for free music education, a school for training music teachers, and a theater school. While Hindemith took over the control of the music classes, the administration of the theatre classes was given to the German theater actor Carl Ebert (1887–1980).

=== Ankara State Conservatory (1936–1982) ===
The parts of institution providing music and theatre education formed the State Conservatory in 1936 apart from the School of Music Teachers. The activities of the conservatory started in 1936. The Conservatory shared the same builfing with the School of Music Teachers until 1938, when the latter was transferred to "Gazi Secondary Teachers' School and Education Institute" ("Gazi Orta Muallim Mektebi ve Terbiye Enstitüsü"), which was renamed to "Music Branch of Gazi Secondary Teachers and Education Institute" ("Gazi Orta Öğretmen ve Terbiye Enstitüsü Müzik Şubesi ").

Students of the School of Music Teachers, who passed an examination in May 1936, were to the conservatory. The first students of the conservatory started the education in November 1936. The ceremony of the first graduates took place on 3 July 1941 attended by President İsmet İnönü (1884–1973) and high officials.

The law on foundation of the State Conservatory, proposed by Minister of Education Hasan Âli Yücel, was enacted on 20 May 1940. According to the law, the conservatory is to cover music, drama and dance. The Music Department's fields are musical composition, orchestra conducting, performance of musical instruments like piano-organ-harp, string, woodwind and percussion instruments, as well as singing. The Drama and Dance Department educates in theatre, opera and ballet branches. The conservatory provides education in two levels, medium and high. A stage was established for theatre and opera practise. Although included in the foundation law, Ankara State Conservatory formed in the beginning no ballet branch. The first ballet school was officially established in Istanbul in 1948. The "Yeşilköy Ballet School" was established as a result of the cooperation of the Turkish Government and the British Cultural Committee with the consultancy of Dame Ninette de Valois (1898–2001), the founder of the Royal Ballet School and Society. By March 1950, this school moved to Ankara, and was included in the State Conservatory as the Ballet Department.

With this law, the Conservatory has become a model for other conservatories to be established in the country, and institutions that train performing artists.

The training of conductors of military bands was carried out at the conservatory from 1938 on. In 1979, the bandmaster branch was added to the conservatory for education of a four-year undergraduate program.

In 1972, the administration of the conservatory was transferred from the Öinistry of National Education to the Undersecretariat of Culture at Prime Ministry. From 1975 to 1982, it was subordinated to the General Directorate of Fine Artsat the Ministry of Culture. In the 1980s, Ankara State Conservatory was taken over by Hacettepe University in Ankara as its part.

=== Affiliation with Hacettepe University (1982–present) ===
In accordance of the law of 1981, all higher education institutions were gathered under the umbrella of the Council of Higher Education (Turkish: Yükseköğretim Kurulu, YÖK). Academies were transformed into universities, education institutes into education faculties, and conservatories and vocational schools were affiliated with universities. In this context, Ankara State Conservatory was transferred to Hacettepe University's Faculty of Fine Arts on 20 July 20, 1982.

Teaching staff of the conservatory were promoted to university faculty members between 1983 and 1986. Their appointment was carried out in line with the criteria determined first by YÖK and then by the university.

On 3 December 1984, the Conservatory was granted faculty authority to pave the way for its development, affiliated directly to the office of the Rector, and thus gained the right of representation in the university senate.

=== New branches ===
The conservatory gained a new branch in 1986. The Ethnomusicology and Folklore Department, founded by İstemihan Taviloğlu, İlhan Baran, Ertuğrul Bayraktarkatal and Halil Erdoğan Cengiz, started education in 1988. In 2007, the department was renamed to Musicology, and education continued with a renewed undergraduate and graduate program.

Again in 1986, with the initiative of Ahmet Kanneci, a part-time student program for guiter art was implemented. In addition to the existing part-time program, a full-time undergraduate program was opened in 2005 and a master's program in 2010 within the art branch.

ANother new branch is the Choreology-Choreography Art Branch under the Ballet Major, which was opened with the initiative of İnci Kurşunlu and the support of Rosalynd Elliott in 1987.

In 1995, Müride Aksan and Suna Eden Şenel created an archive, which features Turkish ballet works and Turkish folk dances with Benesh Movement Notation. A master's degree program was opened to support the archiving.

The youngest of the eight branches of the conservatory is the Jazz Department, which was initiated by Emre Kartari, Erol Erdinç, Bige Bediz Kınıklı and American saxophonist George "Skip" Gailes, started education in 2010.

== Pre-college divisions ==
In addition to the higher education carried out in the conservatory, there is a Music and Ballet Primary School, and primary education is provided. Music and Performing Arts in secondary education is also a part of the institution.

== Academic and administrative staff ==
The academic staff of the conservatory consists of 166 personnel, including 7 professors, 15 associate professors, 17 assistant professors, 21 artist lecturers, 14 art practitioners, 2 stage practitioners, 1 expert, 14 lecturers, 4 instructors, 11 foreigner contracted lecturers, 50 teaching assistants and 10 research assistants.

The administrative duties of the conservatory are carried out by a staff of thirty people.

== Notable people ==
=== Faculty ===
- Necil Kazım Akses (1908–1999)
- İlhan Baran (born 1934)
- Saadet İkesus Altan (1916–2007)
- Carl Ebert (1887–1980)
- Ulvi Cemal Erkin (1906–1972)
- Paul Hindemith (1895–1963)
- Yıldız Kenter (1928–2019)
- Ahmet Adnan Saygun (1907–1991)
- İstemihan Taviloğlu (1945–2006)

- Rabia erler (1919–2006)

=== Alumni ===
- Esin Afşar (1936–2011)
- Zafer Algöz (born 1961)
- Can Atilla (born 1969)
- Gürer Aykal (born 1942)
- Evelyn Baghtcheban (1928–2010)
- Samin Baghtcheban (1925–2008)
- İlhan Baran (born 1934)
- Melek Baykal (born 1954)
- Jale Birsel (1927–2019)
- Mesude Çağlayan (1918–2011)
- Levent Çoker (born 1958)
- Alperen Duymaz (born 1992)
- Erol Erdinç (born 1945)
- Işıl German (1953–2016)
- Rengim Gökmen (born 1955)
- Güven Hokna (born 1946)
- Kamran Ince (born 1960)
- Müşfik Kenter (1932–2012)
- Yıldız Kenter (1928–2019)
- Şefika Kutluer (born 1961)
- Mehmet Ali Nuroğlu (born 1979)
- Zuhal Olcay (born 1957)
- Önder Sisters (born 1965)
- Özge Özder (born 1978)
- İlyas Salman (born 1949)
- Fazıl Say (born 1970)
- Benyamin Sönmez (1983–2011)
- Pamela Spence (born 1973)
- Meriç Sümen (born 1943)
- Muammer Sun (1932–2021)
- Selçuk Sun (1934–2016)
- İstemihan Taviloğlu (1945–2006)
- Tolga Tekin (born 1973)
- Ekin Tunçay Turan
- Cihan Ünal (born 1946)
- İlhan Usmanbaş (1921–2025)
- Cem Yiğit Üzümoğlu (born 1994)
- Sumru Yavrucuk (born 1961)
- Işıl Yücesoy (born 1945)
