= Ayla Erduran =

Turkish violinist (1934–2025)

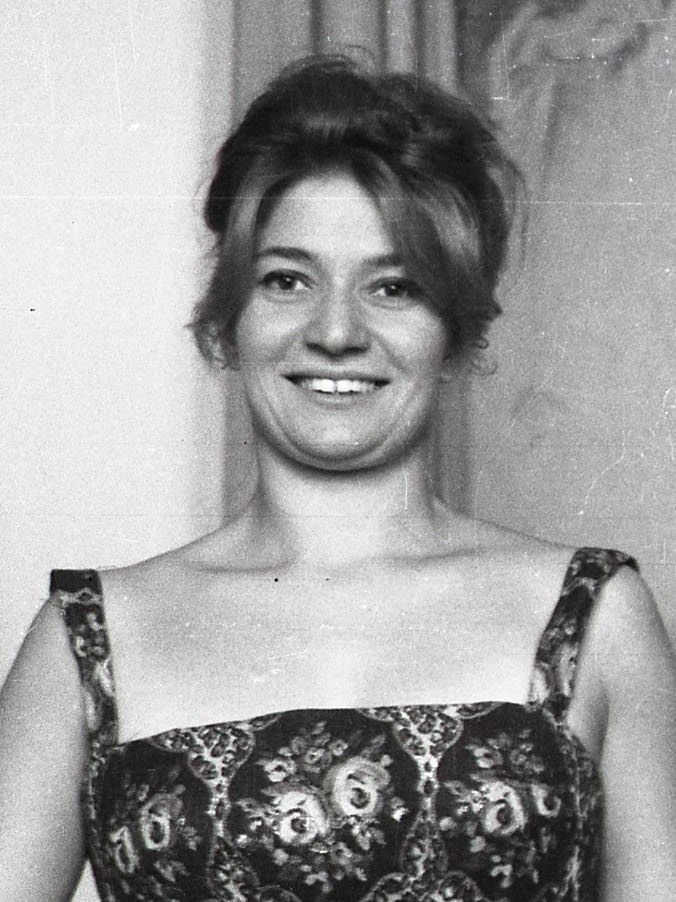
- Erduran in Aliye Berger's workshop
- Born: 22 August 1934; Istanbul, Turkey
- Died: 7 January 2025 (aged 90); Istanbul, Turkey
- Resting place: Zincirlikuyu Cemetery
- Occupation: Classical violinist
- Organization: Presidential Symphony Orchestra

Ayla Erduran (22 August 1934 – 7 January 2025) was a Turkish classical violinist. She studied in Istanbul, Paris, the US and Moscow. A fifth place prize in the 1957 Henryk Wieniawski Violin Competition opened an international career for her. She toured widely, such as in the Middle East with the Presidential Symphony Orchestra and in Africa with pianist Verda Erman in 1968. She taught the violin in Lausanne, Switzerland, from 1973 to 1990.

== Biography ==
=== Early life and education ===
Erduran was born on 22 August 1934 in Istanbul to Kadriye Erduran and urologist Behcet Sabit Erduran. Her mother was of mixed heritage, with Armenian, Greek, Italian, and Polish ancestry. Ayla was introduced to violin by her mother, who played the instrument. She began studying under Karl Berger at age four, and performed her first recital, accompanied by Ferdi Statzer, a benefit for the Child Protection Agency at the Saray Cinema, when she was 10 years old. She often played for guests who came to her home, including Fuad Köprülü, Yunus Nadi, and Yahya Kemal. In 2015, Erduran recalled that her intense musical studies, encouraged by her mother, resulted in childhood isolation.

She went on to study violin at the Conservatoire de Paris from 1946 to 1951, and graduated with top honors. After her graduation, she went to the United States where she studied with Ivan Galamian and Zino Francescatti until 1955. From 1957 to 1958, Erduran studied with David Oistrakh at the Moscow Conservatory. She won the fifth place prize in the Henryk Wieniawski Violin Competition in 1957.

=== Career ===
In 1958, Erduran premiered Ulvi Cemal Erkin's Violin Concerto in Belgium, conducted by the composer. Her first major tours were in Canada in 1961 and 1962; she then joined the Presidential Symphony Orchestra on their 1963 Middle East tour. In 1964, she performed in London for the first time. Her 1965 concert at London's Royal Albert Hall the following year was broadcast live by the BBC. That same year, Erduran also performed the Violin Concerto by Sibelius with the Orchestre de la Suisse Romande in Geneva, conducted by Ernest Ansermet on the occasion of the 100th anniversary of Sibelius. For much of her early career, Erduran disliked being a soloist, finding it lonely; it was not until she turned 50 that she enjoyed her solo performances.

Her African tour, with Turkish pianist Verda Erman, began in 1968. Beginning in the 1970s, Erduran began playing only Bach; she said he was the only composer who could heal her soul following the murder of her cousin and aunt. In 1971, she was given the title of State Artist of the Republic of Turkey. In 1973, she played with Yehudi Menuhin at the first International Istanbul Festival. In 1977, she joined the Presidential Symphony Orchestra again, this time for a three-week European tour.

Erduran performed with major orchestras, including the London Symphony Orchestra, the RIAS-Symphonie-Orchester, and the Czech Philharmonic. Her performances were broadcast on radio in Canada, Switzerland, England, Germany, Brazil, Bulgaria, Russia, Poland, Iraq, the Netherlands, and the US. Erduran performed with notable musicians, such as Yehudi Menuhin, Henryk Szeryng, the Navarra String Quartet, Igor Oistrakh, Valery Oistrakh, Victor Pikayzen, Guy Fallot, Collins, and Mieczysław Weinberg. In 1985, she recorded the Violin Concerto by Johannes Brahms with the London Philharmonic Orchestra.

She taught violin from 1973 to 1990 in Switzerland, including master's classes at the Lausanne Conservatory. After this, she permanently returned to Istanbul.

=== Personal life ===
Erduran never married or had children, which she attributed to the time that her career required. However, she said in an interview that she would have loved to. She continued to play violin in her later years for three to four hours a day.

Erduran died on 7 January 2025, at the age of 90. Her death was announced by Gülsin Onay. On 9 January 2025, after the ceremony at the Atatürk Cultural Center Türk Telekom Opera Hall and the funeral prayer at Taksim Mosque, she was interred in her family's plot at the Zincirlikuyu Cemetery in Istanbul.

== Awards and recognition ==
- 1957: Henryk Wieniawski Violin Competition, fifth place
- 1964: Harriet Cohen-Olga Veryney Award
- 1970: Beethoven Award of the Netherlands
- State Artist by the Republic of Turkey, 1971
- 2006: Gold Medal, Sevda-Cenap And Music Foundation (SCAMV) in Ankara
- 2012: Medaille d'Honneur – Medaille de Vermeil, Société d'Encouragement au Progrès and the French Senate
- 2015: Honorary Award, D-Marin Festival
