= Hikmet Şimşek =

Hikmet Şimşek (1924, Pervari – 12 October 2001, Ankara) was a Turkish conductor of Western classical music.

== Life ==
His father was an officer. He was born in Pervari (of Siirt Province). But the family soon moved to Konya. In 1936, he attended military junior high school. He continued his military training in Ankara. But in 1946, before completing military education, he transferred to Ankara conservatoire where he was trained under Eduard Zuckmayer, Ferit Alnar and Adnan Saygun. In 1953, he graduated from the conservatoire with honors. He married painter Nihal Şimşek.

== Career ==
He began teaching in the conservatoire and after 1959 he was appointed as the assistant conductor of the Presidential Symphony Orchestra (CSO) of Turkey. He kept this position up to 1986. He became one of the most popular classic music men: Because he worked hard to publicize classical music by radio programs of Turkish Radio and Television Corporation (TRT) on Sundays. In these programs, before playing he lectured on the compositions. He also introduced Turkish composers via foreign language services of TRT. In 1981 he received the honorary title of state artist of Turkey. In the 1980s, he released a number of albums with compositions from Turkey.

He also took part in the formation of three new conservatoires in Turkey, namely those of İzmir, Bursa and Çukurova conservatoires.

== Death ==
He died on 12 October 2001 in Ankara military hospital where he was taken due to brain tumor.
