= János Kulka (conductor) =

Hungarian conductor and composer

- Born: 11 December 1929; Budapest, Hungary
- Died: 18 October 2001 (aged 71); Stuttgart, Germany
- Occupations: Conductor; Composer
- Organizations: Hungarian State Opera House; Opernhaus Wuppertal; Nordwestdeutsche Philharmonie

János Kulka (11 December 1929 – 18 October 2001) was a Hungarian conductor and composer.

== Career ==
Kulka studied in Budapest, where he was born. He was solo repetiteur and later conductor at the Hungarian State Opera House. Since 1957 he worked in Vienna, at the Bavarian State Opera, the Staatstheater Stuttgart and since 1961 at the Hamburg State Opera. From 1964 to 1975 he was Generalmusikdirektor in Wuppertal and also a guest conductor in Germany and abroad. From 1976 to 1987 he was the director of the Nordwestdeutsche Philharmonie, recording among others works of Franz Liszt, Hungarian Rhapsody No. 6, Two Episodes of Lenau's Faust and Hunnenschlacht. At the same time he was Staatskapellmeister in Stuttgart.

He died in Stuttgart in October 2001.
