= Rengim Gökmen =

Turkish conductor (born 1955)

- Born: August 19, 1955; Ankara, Turkey
- Occupation: Conductor

Rengim Gokmen (born August 19, 1955, Ankara) is a Turkish conductor.

He is a music man who held important positions in classical music life of Turkey. He was the general director of Turkish State Opera and Ballet between 1992 and 1995 and between 2007 and 2014. and also the principal conductor of Presidential Symphony Orchestra between 2006 and 2020.

== Early life and education ==
Gökmen was born in Istanbul, Turkey in 1955. He had his first music lessons from his family and was admitted to the piano section of the Ankara State Conservatory in 1964. Subsequently, he was admitted to the Composition section of the same conservatory and there he studied with İlhan Baran and Adnan Saygun. He graduated from these sections in 1974.

In 1975 Gökmen was awarded with a scholarship by the Turkish Government to continue his studies on orchestra conducting in Rome. He became the student of orchestra conducting class in Santa Cecilia Conservatory. In the meantime he made advanced studies on violin which he had started in Turkey. Subsequently, he was admitted to the course for advanced studies in orchestra conducting in Santa Cecilia National Academy under the direction of Franco Ferrara. He received his diploma from Santa Cecilia Conservatory in 1978 and in the same year he qualified for ‘’Diploma di Merito’’ by Accademia Chigiana in Siena. In 1979, Gökmen completed his advanced studies at Academy of Santa Cecilia. His achievements qualified him to conduct a concert with Orchestra Nazionale dell’ Accademia di Santa Cecilia at Via della Conciliazione.

He also attended summer courses on orchestra conducting in Austria, England and Netherlands.

== Career ==
In July 1980, he won Gino Marinuzzi contest for young international conductors. Then he conducted many orchestras both in Turkey and in Europe.

During the 1984-1989 season, he served as the general music director of Ankara State Opera and Ballet. In 1989 he was awarded "Cavalleria in ordine di Merito" by the Italian Government.

Between 1991 and 2006 he was the music director and the principal conductor of Izmir State Symphony Orchestra. Meanwhile he also conducted concerts and made recordings in Turkey and abroad with Izmir State Symphony Orchestra.

He held the position as the general director of Turkish State Opera and Ballet between 1992 and 1995. In 1999, Turkish Presidential Culture and Art Prize and in 2000, Gold Medal of "Foyer des Artistes" in Rome, Italy are presented to Gökmen.

He reappointed as the general director of Turkish State Opera and Ballet in 2007 and held the position until 2014. Since 2007, he also served as principal conductor of Presidential Symphony Orchestra until 2020.

He is a member of the Advisory Committee of Ankara and Istanbul International Art Festivals. He is founder and principal conductor of the Doğuş Children’s Symphony Orchestra based in Turkey. He also serves as the supervisor of the İzmir Karşıyaka Municipality Chamber Orchestra, which was founded in 2015 and teaches conducting at Hacettepe University Ankara State Conservatory.

He is the acting Dean of the Faculty of Fine Arts and Design at Ankara Bilim University.
