= Gürer Aykal =

Turkish conductor (born 1942)

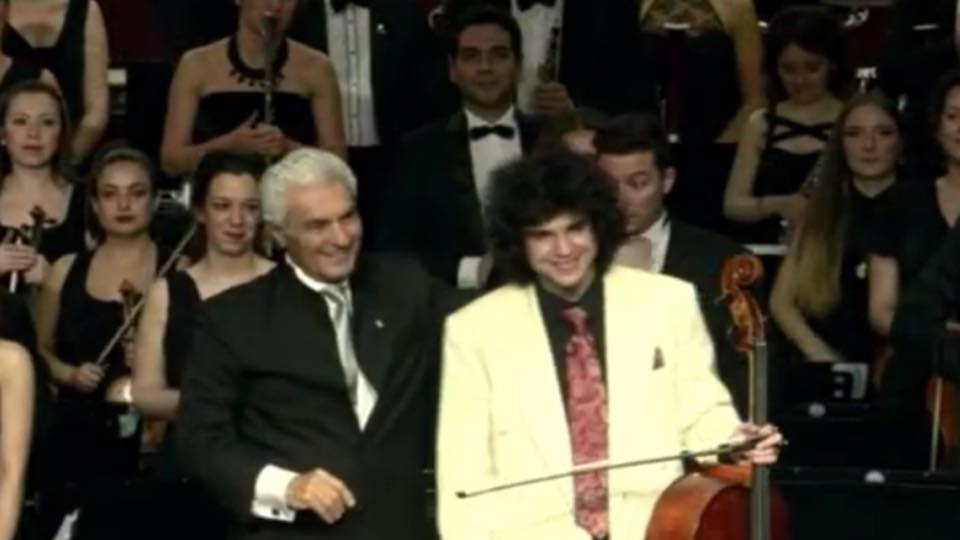
- Born: May 22, 1942 (age 84); Çifteler, Eskişehir, Turkey
- Spouses: Duygu Aykal (m. 1964; died 1988) Benin Aykal (m. 1996)
- Children: 3

Gürer Aykal (born May 22, 1942) is a Turkish conductor and adjunct professor at Bilkent University. He has been the musical director and principal conductor of the Borusan Istanbul Philharmonic Orchestra since 1999.

== Education ==
Aykal was born in Eskişehir, Turkey. He studied at the Ankara State Conservatory, completing a course on violin in 1963 (under Necdet Remzi Atak) and another on composition in 1969 (under Ahmed Adnan Saygun). He went on to study conducting in London at the Guildhall School of Music, where he was taught by such conductors as André Previn and George Hurst. He then went to Italy for further study, graduating with a D.M.A. in conducting from Santa Cecilia Academy of Music in 1973. Finally, on Adnan Saygun's request, he stayed in Italy to study Gregorian chant and polyphonic Renaissance music at the Pontificio Istituto di Musica Sacra.

== Career ==
Aykal has conducted the Istanbul State Symphony Orchestra, the English Chamber Orchestra, the London Philharmonic Orchestra, the Sinfonieorchester des Norddeutschen Rundfunks Hamburg, the Ankara Chamber Orchestra (which he founded with Suna Kan), and the Concertgebouw Chamber Orchestra. In 1975 he became the principal conductor of the Presidential Symphony Orchestra in Ankara.

From 1987 to 1991, Aykal was the music director of the Lubbock Symphony Orchestra in Texas, and subsequently from 1992 to 2004 he served as the music director of the El Paso Symphony Orchestra, also in Texas. Among Aykal's other appointments since returning to Turkey, he was named Artistic Director of the Antalya International Piano Festival in the summer of 2014.

== Awards ==
The Turkish government awarded him the honorary title of State Artist in 1981 for his services to music.

== Sources and external links ==
- Harriet Smith, "Turkish Delight" (BBC Music Magazine 12:11, July 2004: pp 28–31)
- "Gürer Aykal" — Leyla Gencer Voice Competition page
- "Gürer Aykal" — Bilkent University
