= İdil Biret =

Turkish concert pianist

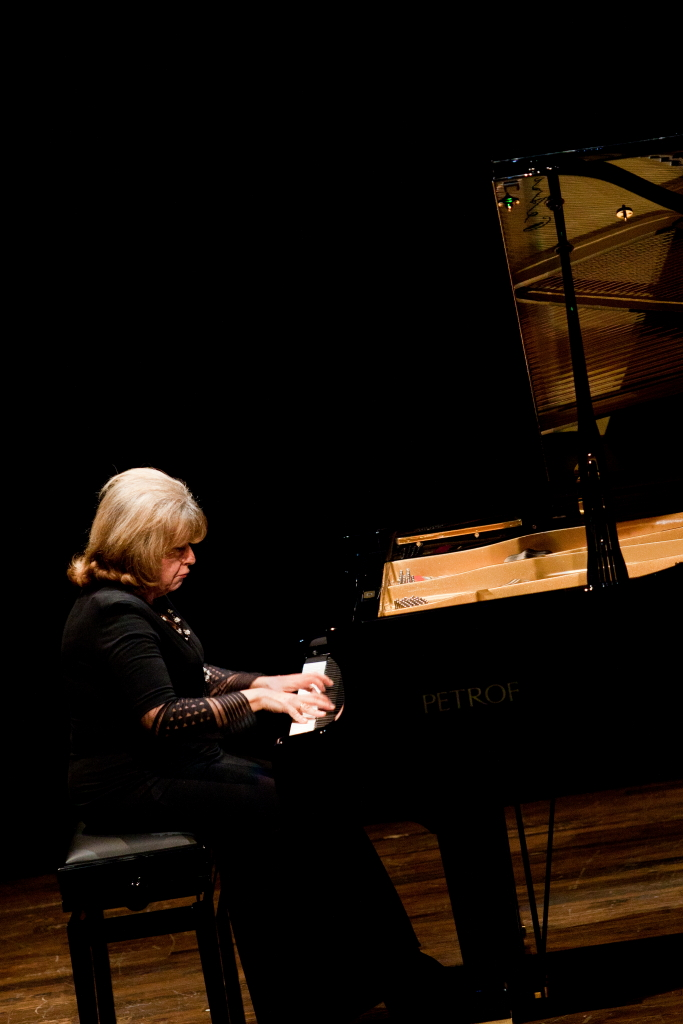
- İdil Biret at Küçükçekmece, İstanbul in 2012

Background information
- Born: November 21, 1941 (age 84); Ankara, Turkey
- Genres: Classical music
- Occupation: Concert pianist
- Instrument: Piano
- Spouse: Şefik Büyükyüksel
- Website: idilbiret.eu

İdil Biret (born 21 November 1941) is a Turkish concert pianist.

== Education ==
Biret began her lessons at the age of five with Mithat Fenmen, who had studied under Nadia Boulanger and Alfred Cortot. When she was seven, the Turkish parliament enacted a special law which enabled her to study abroad and so she studied at the Paris Conservatory in France under the tutelage of Nadia Boulanger and Jean Doyen. She graduated with three prizes at the age of 15. She continued her education with Alfred Cortot and Wilhelm Kempff.

== Musical career ==
She was already interested in music at the age of 2 and started to play Johann Sebastian Bach's preludes at the age of 4. When she was 7 or 8 years old she used to listen to Brahms. Later on she discovered Sergei Rachmaninoff.

From the age of 16, Biret played as a soloist with the most distinguished orchestras in the world, including the London Symphony, the Philharmonia, the London Philharmonic, the Boston Symphony, the Leningrad Philharmonic, the Leipzig Gewandhaus, the Dresden Staatskapelle, the Orchestre de la Suisse Romande, the Tokyo Philharmonic, the Warsaw Philharmonic, the Orchestre National de France and the Sydney Symphony. She collaborated with eminent conductors such as Hermann Scherchen, Pierre Monteux, Erich Leinsdorf, Rudolf Kempe, Gennady Rozhdestvensky, Aaron Copland, Rafael Frühbeck de Burgos, Charles Mackerras, Jean Fournet, José Serebrier, Moshe Atzmon, Antoni Wit and Hiroyuki Iwaki. Biret also gave concerts at the festivals of Berlin, Montreal, Istanbul, Dubrovnik, Montpellier, Nohant, Persepolis, Royan and Athens. Idil Biret had her US concert premier at Symphony Hall in Boston under Erich Leinsdorf on Friday, November 22, 1963. Just before she was to play (Rachmaninoff Piano Concerto #3), Maestro Leinsdorf addressed the audience, saying that "we have just heard on the wireless that the President of the United States has been the victim of an assassination!" After the audience got over the shock, the orchestral management and players agreed to proceed with Biret's performance.

She has been a jury member at several piano competitions: Van Cliburn (US), Queen Elisabeth (Belgium), Montreal (Canada), Liszt (Weimar, Germany) and Busoni (Italy).

Her numerous recordings (more than 100 to date) for labels such as EMI, Decca, Atlantic, Finnadar and Naxos include the Saint-Saëns' piano concertos nos. 2, 4, 5, world-premiere recording of Liszt's transcriptions of the nine Beethoven symphonies (EMI 6LP/1986), complete solo piano works and concertos of Chopin (15CD/1992), of Brahms (12CD/1997), Rachmaninoff (10CD/2000) and the piano transcription of Stravinsky’s ballet music The Firebird (2003) and many others. Biret's wide repertoire encompasses much of the late Classical and Romantic piano literature. She is probably best known for her Chopin recordings, which won her the prestigious 'Grand Prix du Disque Frédéric Chopin' in Poland in 1995. In 2004 the sale of her Naxos CDs worldwide reached two million copies. Naxos commemorated this event by presenting Biret with a platinum disc. The same year the Boulez sonatas recording won the annual Golden Diapason award and was selected among the best recordings of the year by Le Monde newspaper in France.

Biret has played in cycles the complete piano works of Beethoven and Brahms. In the 1980s she performed in two series of concerts Beethoven’s 32 sonatas and the piano transcription (Liszt) of all the 9 Symphonies, the latter broadcast live by Radio France. In the 1990s she played Beethoven’s five Piano Concertos, the Choral Fantasia and the Triple Concerto in five concerts. In 1997 she played all the solo piano works of Brahms in a series of five recitals in Germany during the composer’s centennial anniversary.

Her recordings of 20th century classical pieces include the three piano sonatas of Pierre Boulez (Naxos Records 1995) as well as the piano works and editions of Wilhelm Kempff (Marco Polo 1991). Idil Biret also recorded the etudes (volume 1 and 2) of György Ligeti for Naxos, which was released in 2003. Earlier, in the 1970s she recorded in New York for Finnadar/Atlantic records works by Boucourechliev, Anton Webern, Alban Berg, İlhan Mimaroğlu, Leo Brouwer, Castiglioni, Alexander Scriabin, Sergei Prokofiev and Nikolai Myaskovsky.

In September 2006 a biography "Idil Biret - Une Pianiste Turque en France" was written by a French author, Prof. Dominique Xardel and published by Buchet/Chastel in France. The book has been translated into Turkish and published by Can Yayinlari. The German translation of the book has been published by Staccato Verlag in September 2007. Russian translation will be available shortly. English translation of the book is also available in a special edition privately.

She has recorded the complete Beethoven piano sonatas and concertos for her own label. It was released in 2008–2009 as an integral set, along with her 1986 EMI recordings of the nine Beethoven symphonies, as transcribed for piano by Franz Liszt. The complete set will include 19 CDs. Biret recorded most of the sonatas near Brussels between 2001–2005 (three were recorded in 1994). She recorded the concertos with the Bilkent Symphony Orchestra conducted by Antoni Wit in 2008. Biret is the only pianist to have performed all of Beethoven's piano sonatas, concertos and Liszt transcriptions of the nine symphonies in public concerts. She is now the first pianist to have recorded them all.

In an interview in 2014, she expressed interest in improvisation and the Opus Clavicembalisticum by Sorabji.

== Awards and recognition ==
Biret has been a State Artist since 1971, an honorary title issued to artists by the government of Turkey for their contributions into the Turkish culture.

In 1987 Gürdal Duyar, renowned sculptor of Atatürk monuments around Turkey, offered to sculpt a bust of her. He arrived at her house with a lump of clay in his hand, however after working on the clay bust for some time the clay started to dry out and crack and Duyar left with the work in progress, the bust, to make a plaster cast mould of it. After Duyar died, the fate of the bust was unknown for some time until it resurfaced when Şefik Büyükyüksel, the spouse of Biret, discovered a photo of it online in the private collection of Dr. Baha Toygar who had bought it from a gallery owned by Emel Say.

In 1995, Biret's recordings of Chopin's entire oeuvre was awarded the "Grand Prix du Disque Frédéric Chopin" in Poland. The same year, she won the "Diapason d'Or" prize in France for her recording of Boulez's sonatas, which was selected among the best recordings of the year by the newspaper Le Monde.

Biret also received the following awards: the Lili Boulanger Memorial Prize in Boston (US), the Harriet Cohen/Dinu Lipatti Gold Medal in London (UK) the Polish Prize for Artistic Merits, the National Knight Merit Order of France, the Adelaide Ristori Prize, Italy. In 2007 she was decorated with Distinguished Service Order – Cavalry Cross by the Polish President Lech Kaczynski for her contributions to Polish culture with her recordings and performances of Chopin's music.
