= Presidential Symphony Orchestra =

Turkish symphony orchestra

- Orchestra
- Native name: Cumhurbaşkanlığı Senfoni Orkestrası
- Short name: CSO
- Founded: 1826
- Location: Ankara, Turkey
- Principal conductor: Cemi'i Can Deliorman
- Website: cso.gov.tr

The Presidential Symphony Orchestra (Turkish: Cumhurbaşkanlığı Senfoni Orkestrası; CSO), with headquarters in Ankara, is the presidential symphony orchestra of the Republic of Turkey. Its history dates back as far as 1826, making it one of the first symphony orchestras in the world.

After The Auspicious Incident and closing of the Janissary in 1826 by Sultan Mahmud II, the Ottoman military band was transformed into a Western band. On September 17, 1828, Giuseppe Donizetti assumed the role of principal conductor. Until Sultan Mehmed VI the band was called Mızıka-ı Humayun ("The Imperial Band"). In Vahdeddin's reign, it was called Makam-i Hilafet Muzikasi ("The Caliph's Band").

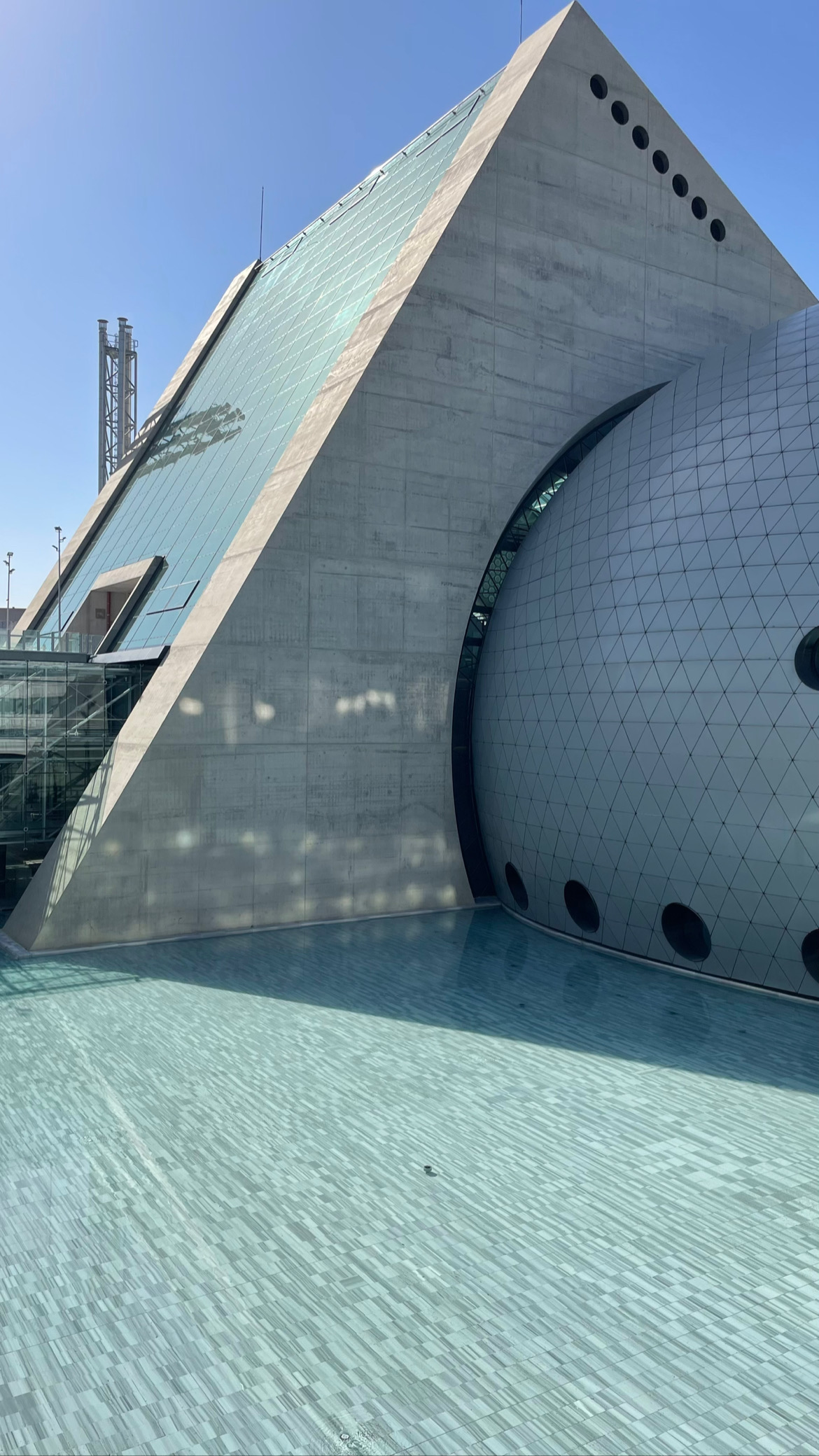
CSO Ada Ankara serves as Presidential Symphony Orchestra Concert Hall in the capital city Ankara.

After the foundation of the Turkish Republic, the state orchestra moved to the new capital Ankara on April 27, 1924, upon the orders of Mustafa Kemal Atatürk, founding president of the Republic of Turkey. Upon moving to Ankara, the Musiki Muallim Mektebi (Music Teacher's School) was also formed (in 1924) with the efforts of Zeki Üngör. This school later became the basis of the Ankara State Conservatory.

On June 25, 1932, the orchestra was renamed the Riyaset-i Cumhur Filarmoni Orkestrası ("The Presidential Philharmonic Orchestra"). With this new formation the band and the orchestra were clearly separated. The Presidential Symphony Orchestra and the Ankara State Conservatory owe their existence to a government policy that started during the early 1930s when the Turkish government invited a large number of musicologists, composers, performers who were at risk in their native Germany, to initiate and to institutionalize music education and performance, including opera, theater and ballet. The scope of the changes made by Paul Hindemith, Licco Amar, Ernst Praetorius, Carl Ebert among many others, bordered on being revolutionary. When Zeki Ungor left the position, Ahmet Adnan Saygun was appointed as the new conductor of the orchestra in 1934. After Ahmet Adnan Saygun's illness Ernst Preatorius succeeded him in 1935. Preatorius held this position until his death in 1946. Hasan Ferit Alnar became the conductor of the orchestra and remained until 1957. In 1957 a law was passed changing the name of the orchestra to Cumhurbaşkanlığı Senfoni Orkestrası ("The Presidential Symphony Orchestra").

As of 2015 the orchestra had played in Germany, Austria, Bulgaria, Romania, Yugoslavia, the Soviet Union, Italy, France, Switzerland, Iran, Iraq, Lebanon, Sweden, Norway, Finland, Spain, Poland, Cyprus, Czechoslovakia, South Korea, Japan, the United States and England.

Between 1961 and 2020, the orchestra played in a concert hall building near by Ankara Railway Station and was moved to its new venue at CSO Ada Ankara in 2020.

== Principal conductors ==
- Zeki Üngör (1924–1934)
- Ahmet Adnan Saygun (1934–1935)
- Dr. Ernst Praetorious (1935–1946)
- Hasan Ferit Alnar (1946–1957)
- Robert Lawrance (1957–1959)
- Hikmet Şimşek (1959–2001)
- Bruno Bogo (1960–1962)
- Otto Matzerath (1962–1963)
- Prof. Gotthold E. Lessing (1963–1971)
- Jean Perrison (1971–1977)
- Tadeusz Strugała (1977–1982)
- Hikmet Şimşek (1982–1986)
- Gürer Aykal (1988–1998)
- Rengim Gökmen (2007–2011)
- Erol Erdinç (2011–2014)
- Selman Ada (2014–2016)
- Rengim Gökmen (2016–)
- Cemi'i Can Deliorman (2020- )

== Guest conductors ==
- Alexander Rahbari
- Alpaslan Ertüngealp
- Antonio Pirolli
- Burak Tüzün
- Cem Mansur
- Dmitry Yablonsky
- Doron Salomon
- Emil Tabakov
- Emin Güven Yaslicam
- Erol Erdinc
- Ertug Korkmaz
- Ibrahim Yazici
- Lorenzo Castriota Skanderbeg
- Marek Pijarowski
- Michel Tabachnik
- Naci Özgüc
- Rengim Gökmen
- Server Ganiev
- Shardad Rohani
- Tadeusz Strugala
- Vakhtang Machavariani
