= Mithat Fenmen =

Turkish pianist and composer (1916–1982)

Mithat Fenmen (January 24, 1916 – October 19, 1982) was a Turkish pianist, composer and music teacher.

== Education ==
Mithat Fenmen studied at the Istanbul Conservatory from 1929. In 1939, he went to the École normale de musique de Paris and studied with Robert Casadesus (piano), Alfred Cortot (piano), and Nadia Boulanger (harmony and composition). After graduating in Paris, he went to Munich for postgraduate studies with Joseph Haas (composition) and Li Stadelmann (piano). ^{[1]}

== Career ==
In 1939, at the outbreak of World War II, he returned to Turkey and became a piano teacher at the Ankara National Conservatory. From 1951 to 1954 and from 1970 to 1973 he was director of this conservatory. From 1973 to 1975 he worked as general director of the State Opera and Ballet of Turkey in Ankara. In 1954 he married the British ballet artist Beatrice Appleyard, who herself twice directed the Ankara Conservatory. With her, he founded the Fenmen Ballet Studio. In his last years, Fenmen worked mainly as a piano teacher.

Pupils of Mithat Fenmen included Selman Ada, İdil Biret, Hüsnü Baylav, Pekinel Kardeşler, Gülsin Onay and Fazıl Say.

He wrote a ballet, 5 songs for voice, flute and piano based on his own texts (1938), a concertino for piano and orchestra (1944).

Mithat Fenmen received the title of State Artist of Turkey in 1971. He died in Istanbul in 1982.

== Sources ==
- In: Wilibald Gurlitt (ed.): . 12th, completely revised edition. Personal part: A–K. Schott, Mainz 1959, p. 499
- Wilibald Gurlitt: Mithat Fenmen. In: Riemann Musiklexikon.
