= Music of Turkey =

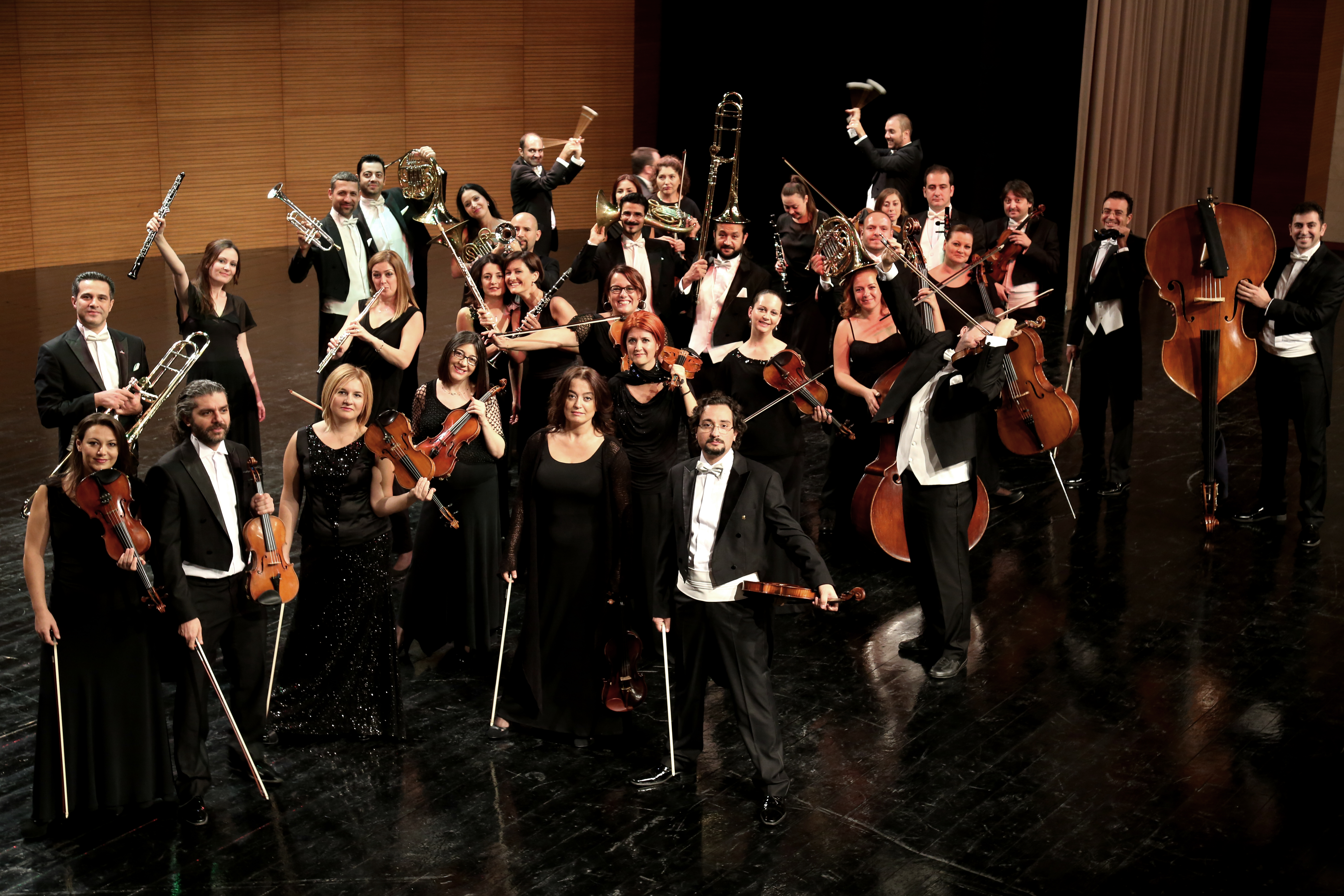
- Bursa State Symphony Orchestra in 2009

The roots of traditional music in Turkey span across centuries to a time when the Seljuk Turks migrated to Anatolia and Persia in the 11th century and contains elements of both Turkic and pre-Turkic influences. Much of its modern popular music can trace its roots to the emergence in the early 1930s drive for Westernization. Âşık, atışma, singing culture, wedding dance continued way of having fun with family and friends as before. Due to industry music and music in daily life aren't same. Turkish people including new generations have nostalgia music culture.

Many Turkish cities and towns have vibrant local music scenes which, in turn, support a number of regional musical styles. Until the 1960s, Turkish music scene was dominated by two genres, Turkish classical music and Turkish folk music with some staple figures like Aşık Veysel, Emel Sayın, Zeki Müren, Şevval Sam, Bülent Ersoy. The 70s came with Anatolian rock and groove music based pop music, iterated by the likes of Cem Karaca and Barış Manço. However, western-style pop music lost popularity to arabesque in the late 1980s, with even its greatest proponents, Ajda Pekkan and Sezen Aksu, falling in status. It became popular again by the beginning of the 1990s, as a result of an opening economy and society. With the support of Aksu, the resurging popularity of pop music gave rise to several international Turkish pop stars such as Tarkan and Sertab Erener. The late 1990s also saw an emergence of underground music producing alternative rock, electronica, hip-hop, rap and dance music in opposition, leaded by the figures such as Şebnem Ferah, Mercan Dede and Ceza, to the mainstream corporate pop and arabesque genres, which many believe have become too commercial.

The 2010s gave rise to indie music groups which were collectively named as "Üçüncü Yeniler" (Third New). With poetic, witty or emotional lyrics, groups' names are deliberately meaningless or employs figure of speech such as in the case of Nükleer Başlıklı Kız (a pun to Turkish translation of the Red Riding Hood). Also, The nostalgia of the 80s and 90s pawed the way for artists like Gaye Su Akyol and Altın Gün to fuze groove vibes into modern music. The 2020s brought in electronic dance music and drill music into mainstream, where they mostly top the charts.

== Classical music ==
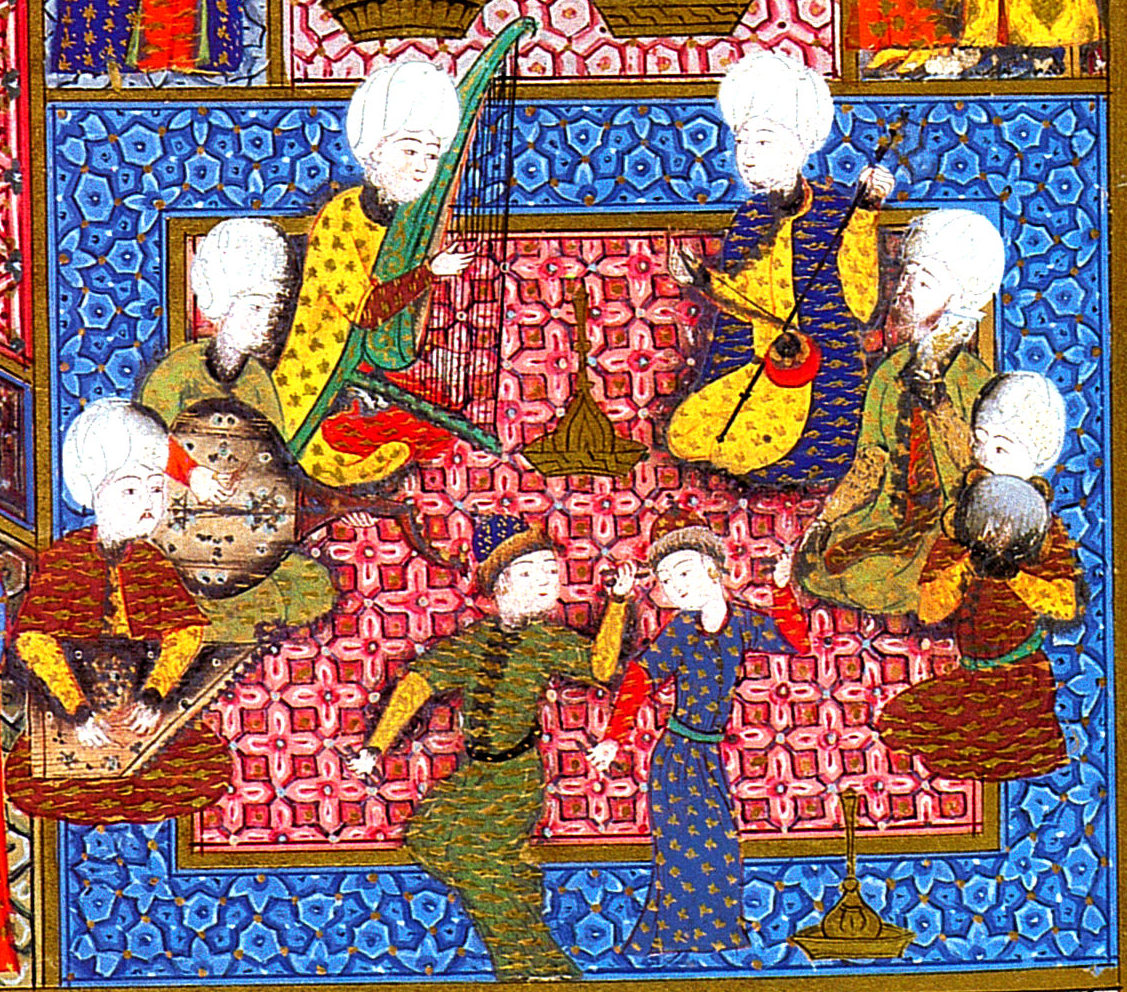
Ottoman orchestra of Suleiman the Magnificent

" Katibim (Üsküdar'a Gider iken)"
An example of Turkish classical music.

Ottoman court music has a large and varied system of modes or scales known as makams, and other rules of composition. A number of notation systems were used for transcribing classical music, the most dominant being the Hamparsum notation in use until the gradual introduction of western notation.

A specific sequence of classical Turkish musical forms becomes a fasıl, a suite consisting of an instrumental prelude (peṣrev), an instrumental postlude (saz semaisi), and in between, the main section of vocal compositions which begins with and is punctuated by instrumental improvisations, called taksim. A full fasıl concert would include four different instrumental forms and three vocal forms, including a light classical song, şarkı. A strictly classical fasıl (in the early 19th-century style) remains in the same makam throughout, from the introductory taksim and usually ending in a dance tune or oyun havası. However shorter şarkı compositions, precursors to modern day songs, are a part of this tradition, many of them extremely old, dating back to the 14th century; many are newer, with late 19th century songwriter Haci Arif Bey being especially popular.

Composers and Performers

Other famous proponents of this genre include Sufi Dede Efendi, Prince Cantemir, Baba Hamparsum, Kemani Tatyos Efendi, Sultan Selim III and Sultan Suleyman the Magnificent. The most popular modern Turkish classical singer is Münir Nurettin Selçuk, who was the first to establish a lead singer position. Other performers include Bülent Ersoy, Zeki Müren, Müzeyyen Senar, Zekai Tunca, Arif Sami Toker and Emel Sayın.

=== Ottoman harem music ===
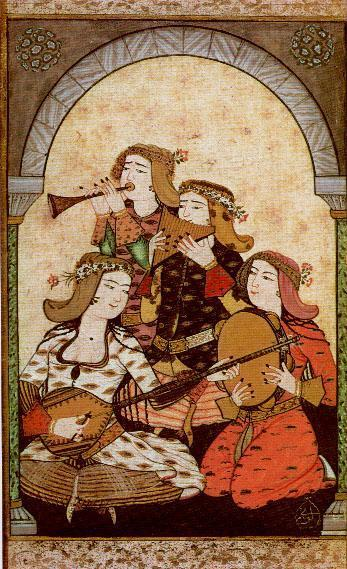
Female musical players. Ottoman miniature painting, 18th century.

From the makams of the royal courts to the melodies of the royal harems, a type of dance music emerged that was different from the oyun havası of fasıl music. In the Ottoman Empire, the harem was that part of a house set apart for the women of the family. It was a place in which non-family males were not allowed. Eunuchs guarded the sultan's harems, which were quite large, including several hundred women who were wives and concubines. There, female dancers and musicians entertained the women living in the harem. Belly dance was performed by women for women. This female dancer, known as a rakkase, which is the Arabic word for "female dancer", hardly ever appeared in public. Although çengis did. As well as köçeks.

This type of harem music was taken out of the sultan's private living quarters and to the public by male street entertainers and hired dancers of the Ottoman Empire, the male rakkas. These dancers performed publicly for wedding celebrations, feasts, festivals, and in the presence of the sultans.

Modern oriental dance in Turkey is derived from this tradition of the Ottoman rakkas. Some mistakenly believe that Turkish oriental dancing is known as Çiftetelli due to the fact that this style of music has been incorporated into oriental dancing by Greeks, illustrated by the fact that the Greek belly dance is sometimes mistakenly called Tsifteteli. However, Çiftetelli is now a form of folk music, with names of songs that describe their local origins, whereas rakkas, as the name suggests, is from Arabic which means "male dancer". Dancers are also known for their adept use of finger cymbals as instruments, also known as zils.

=== Romani influences ===
Romani are known throughout Turkey for their musicianship. Their urban music brought echoes of classical Turkish music to the public via the meyhane or taverna. This type of fasıl music (a style, not to be confused with the fasıl form of classical Turkish music) with food and alcoholic beverages is often associated with the underclass of Turkish society, though it also can be found in more respectable establishments in modern times.

Roma have also influenced the fasıl itself. Played in music halls, the dance music (oyun havası) required at the end of each fasıl has been incorporated with Ottoman rakkas or belly dancing motifs. The rhythmic ostinato accompanying the instrumental improvisation (ritimli taksim) for the bellydance parallels that of the classical gazel, a vocal improvisation in free rhythm with rhythmic accompaniment. Popular musical instruments in this kind of fasıl are the clarinet, violin, kanun, and darbuka. Clarinetist Mustafa Kandıralı is a well-known fasil musician.

=== Military music ===
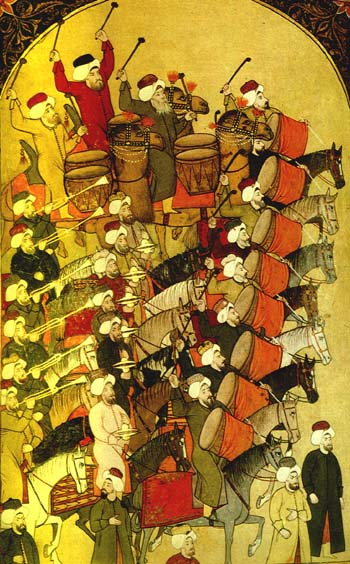
Surname-i Vebbi (fol. 172a), showing military band.

The Janissary bands or Mehter are considered to be the oldest type of military marching band in the world. Individual instrumentalists were mentioned in the Orhun inscriptions, which are believed to be the oldest written sources of Turkish history, dating from the 8th century. However, they were not definitively mentioned as bands until the 13th century. The rest of Europe borrowed the notion of military marching bands from Turkey from the 16th century onwards.

=== Turkish influence on Western classical music ===
Musical relations between the Turks and the rest of Europe can be traced back many centuries, and the first type of musical Orientalism was the Turkish Style. European classical composers in the 18th century were fascinated by Turkish music, particularly the strong role given to the brass and percussion instruments in Janissary bands.

Joseph Haydn wrote his Military Symphony to include Turkish instruments, as well as some of his operas. Turkish instruments were included in Ludwig van Beethoven's Symphony Number 9, and he composed a "Turkish March" for his Incidental Music to The Ruins of Athens, Op. 113. Wolfgang Amadeus Mozart wrote the "Ronda alla turca" in his Sonata in A major and also used Turkish themes in his operas, such as the Chorus of Janissaries from his Die Entführung aus dem Serail (1782). This Turkish influence introduced the cymbals, bass drum, and bells into the symphony orchestra, where they remain. Jazz musician Dave Brubeck wrote his "Blue Rondo á la Turk" as a tribute to Mozart and Turkish music.

=== Western Influence on Turkish classical music ===
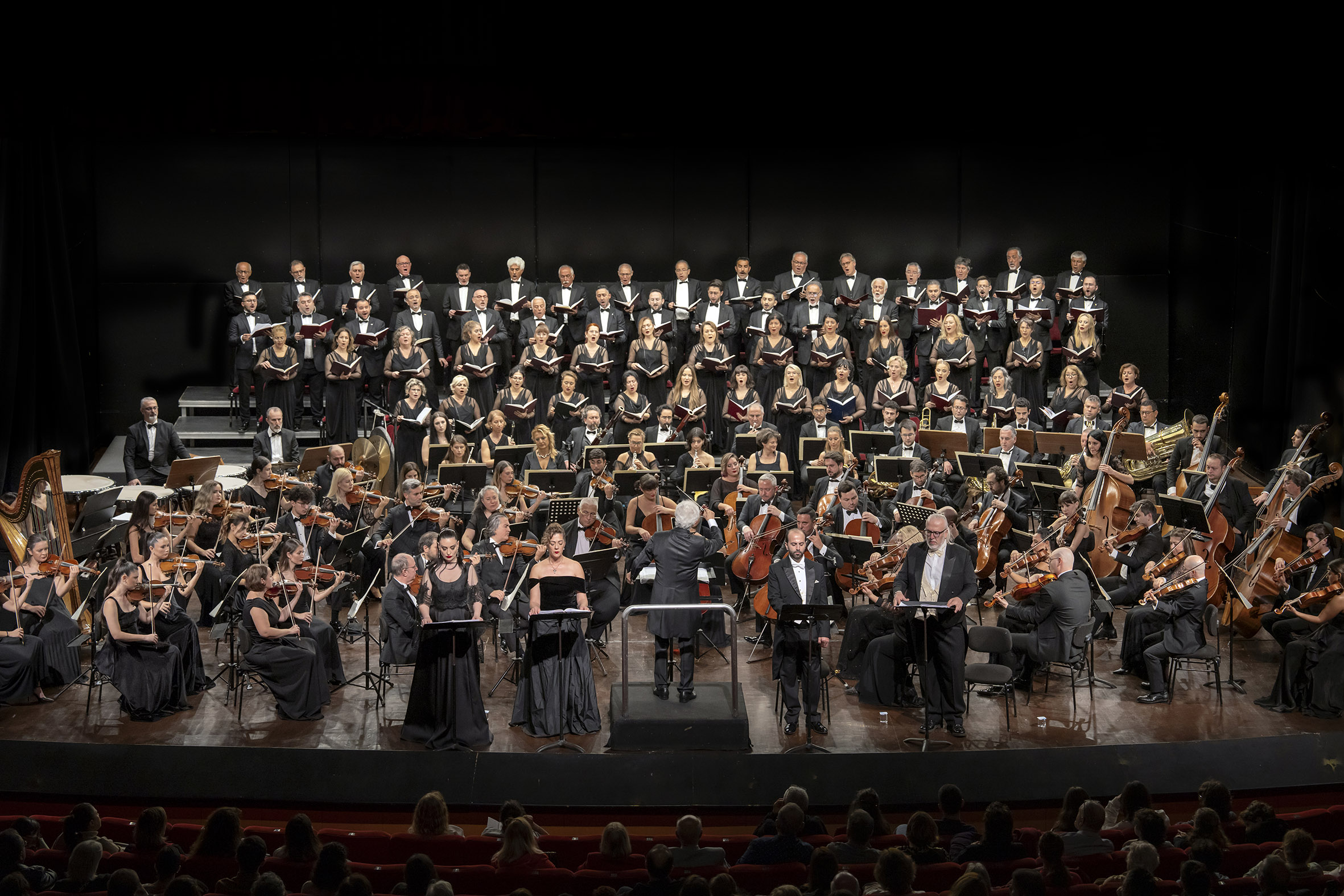
Antalya State Symphony Orchestra in 2018

While the European military bands of the 18th century introduced the percussion instruments of the Ottoman janissary bands, a reciprocal influence emerged in the 19th century in the form of the Europeanisation of the Ottoman army band. In 1827, Giuseppe Donizetti, the elder brother of the renowned Italian opera composer Gaetano Donizetti, was invited to become Master of Music to Sultan Mahmud II. A successor of Donizetti was the German musician Paul Lange, formerly music lecturer at the American College for Girls and at the German High School, who took over the position of Master of the Sultan's Music after the Young Turk Revolution in 1908 and kept it until his death in 1920. A son of Paul Lange was the Istanbul-born American conductor Hans Lange. The Ottoman composer Leyla Saz (1850–1936) provides an account of musical training in the Imperial Palace in her memoirs. As the daughter of the Palace surgeon, she grew up in the Imperial harem where girls were also given music lessons in both Turkish and Western styles.

After the decline of the Ottoman Empire and the creation of a Turkish republic, the transfer of the former Imperial Orchestra or Mızıka-ı Hümayun from Istanbul to the new capital of the state Ankara, and renaming it as the Orchestra of the Presidency of the Republic, Riyaset-i Cumhur Orkestrası, signaled a Westernization of Turkish music. The name would later be changed to the Presidential Symphony Orchestra or Cumhurbaşkanlığı Senfoni Orkestrası.

Further inroads came with the founding of a new school for the training of Western-style music instructors in 1924, renaming the Istanbul Oriental Music School as the Istanbul Conservatory in 1926, and sending talented young musicians abroad for further music education. These students include well-known Turkish composers such as Cemal Reşit Rey, Ulvi Cemal Erkin, Ahmet Adnan Saygun, Necil Kazım Akses and Hasan Ferit Alnar, who became known as the Turkish Five. The founding of the Ankara State Conservatory with the aid of the German composer and music theorist Paul Hindemith in 1936 showed that Turkey in terms of music wanted to be like the West.

However, on the order of the founder of the republic, Atatürk, following his philosophy to take from the West but to remain Turkish in essence, a wide-scale classification and archiving of samples of Turkish folk music from around Anatolia was launched in 1924 and continued until 1953 to collect around 10,000 folk songs. Hungarian composer Béla Bartók visited Ankara and south-eastern Turkey in 1936 within the context of these works.

By 1976, Turkish classical music had undergone a renaissance and a state musical conservatory in Istanbul was founded to give classical musicians the same support as folk musicians. Modern-day advocates of Western classical music in Turkey include Fazıl Say, İdil Biret, Suna Kan, the Önder Sisters and the Pekinel sisters.

== Early Years of The Republic ==
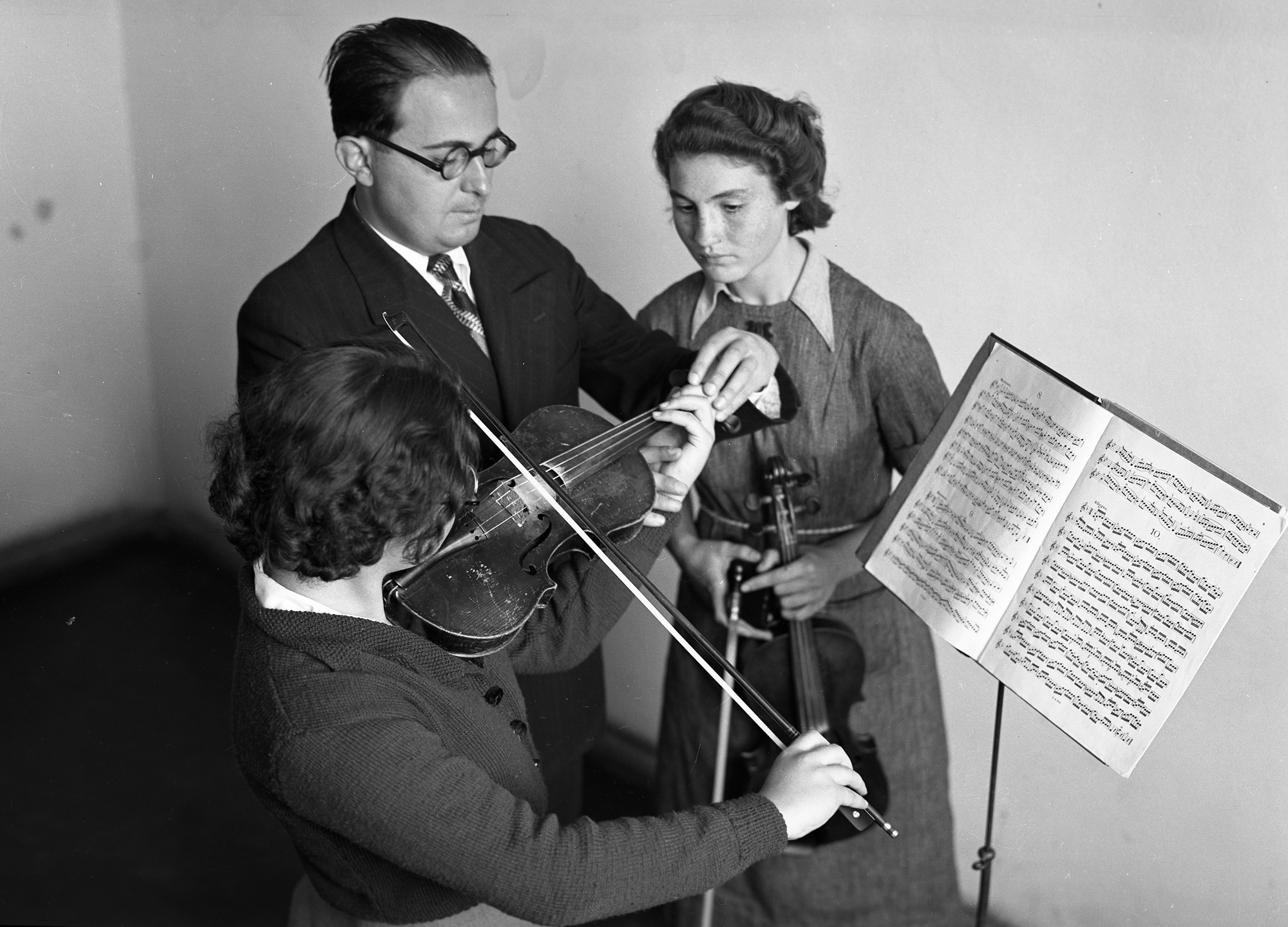
Students in Musiki Muallim Mektebi (Music Teachers’ School, later Ankara State Conservatory, 1930s) with Osman Zeki Üngör

After the Turkish War of Independence ended in 1923, and the borders were drawn, there was a social and political revolution under the leadership of Mustafa Kemal Atatürk. This revolution opted to Westernize the way of living in Turkey. By 1929, all public and commercial communications were made in the Latin alphabet, completely taking the written Ottoman Turkish language out of circulation. A new constitution was written, one that was modeled after the French. This new constitution was designed to make the new Republic of Turkey into a secular, modern, nation-state. Every aspect of the revolution, from major policy changes to clothing reforms, was made in accordance with the Kemalist Ideology. All affairs were carried out followed by a chain of military command for the purpose of reaching the level of Western civilization. Both religious and Turkish classical music was impacted by this top to bottom revolution.

On November 1, 1934 Atatürk made a speech in the Grand National Assembly of Turkey. Alaturca music was banned on radios, public places as well as private properties. Here is the excerpt from the speech, concerning Turkish music, "Folks, we all know how sensitive we, the Turkish, are towards the matters of our cultural legacy…. I am aware what kind of progress that my people want to see within fine arts delivered by the new generation of artists, and musicians. If you ask me, what would be most efficient and quick to tackle first within the fine arts is Turkish Music. The music we are made to listen to these days is far from being a point of pride for Turkish people. We must all know this. We must take our great nation's idioms, stories, experiences and compose them, but only complying to the general rules of music. I wish that the Ministry of Cultural Affairs take this matter seriously, and work alongside the law-makers of our country."

Right after this speech, on November 2, 1934, The Department of Publishing and Press banned Alaturca music, knowing what Mustafa Kemal meant when he said "… but only complying to the general rules of music…" was that the only acceptable type of music available to the public will be music following the principles of western tonal music. The Turkish composers, who were educated abroad in the beginning of the century and came back to Turkey, were assigned to teach classical Turkish musicians the western way of writing and playing music. The Presidential Symphony Orchestra, established back in 1924 started giving weekly free performances in schools specifying in Music Education. New instruments like pianos, trumpets, and saxophones were bought for cultural centers in villages, not just in Istanbul, but in many places like Bursa, Çorum, Gümüşhane, and Samsun.

Along with the radical ideology change, and the sudden application of these new ideas came an obvious tear in the fabric of the society. People who couldn't listen to Turkish music on Turkish Radio sought out the next best thing and started listening to the Arabic Radio. There are records of Turkish people calling into Egyptian, Crimean, and Haifan radio stations requesting Turkish songs they were used to listening to, since The Middle East already consumed and re-created a lot of Turkish Music since the rise of the Ottoman Empire in the middle of the millennium. Turkish people started listening to other nations' version of Turkish songs. This cleared the way for the Arabesque music to become hugely popular in the 70s. Today, there are still prolific and popular Arabesque musicians in Turkey. The ban in the early years of the Republic is exactly why Arabesque Music became a cultural phenomenon.

=== Kanto (Cantare music) ===
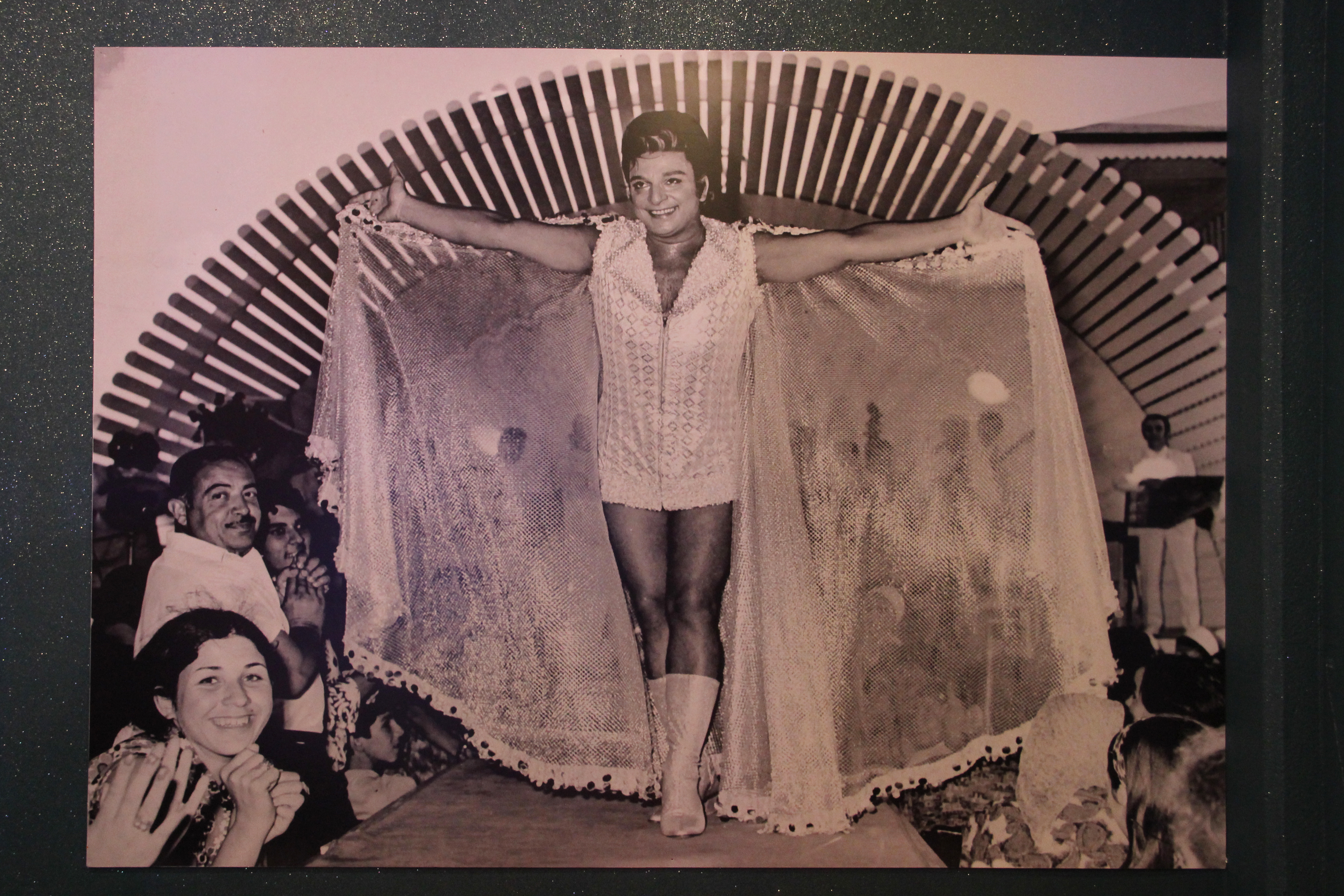
Zeki Müren is a figurehead among LBGT society. His music was also influenced by Kanto.

Italian theater and opera have had a profound effect on Turkish culture in the past century. Like the terminology of seamanship, the terminology of music and theater is derived from Italian. In the argot of the improvisational theater of Istanbul the stage was called "sahano", the backstage was referred to as "koyuntu", backdrops depicting countryside were "bosko", the applause was "furi" and the songs sung between the acts and plays were called "kanto".

As with their Italian counterparts, the Turkish troupes employed songs and music before the show and between the acts to pique people's interest and draw in customers. The troupes orchestra would be made up of such instruments as the trumpet, trombone, violin, trap drum and cymbals. The orchestra would start to play popular songs of the day and marches in front of the theatre about an hour before the show to drum up interest. This intermission or Antrak music ended up with the well-known Izmir March, a sign that the show time was approaching. The play began as the musicians went in and took their places at the side of the stage.

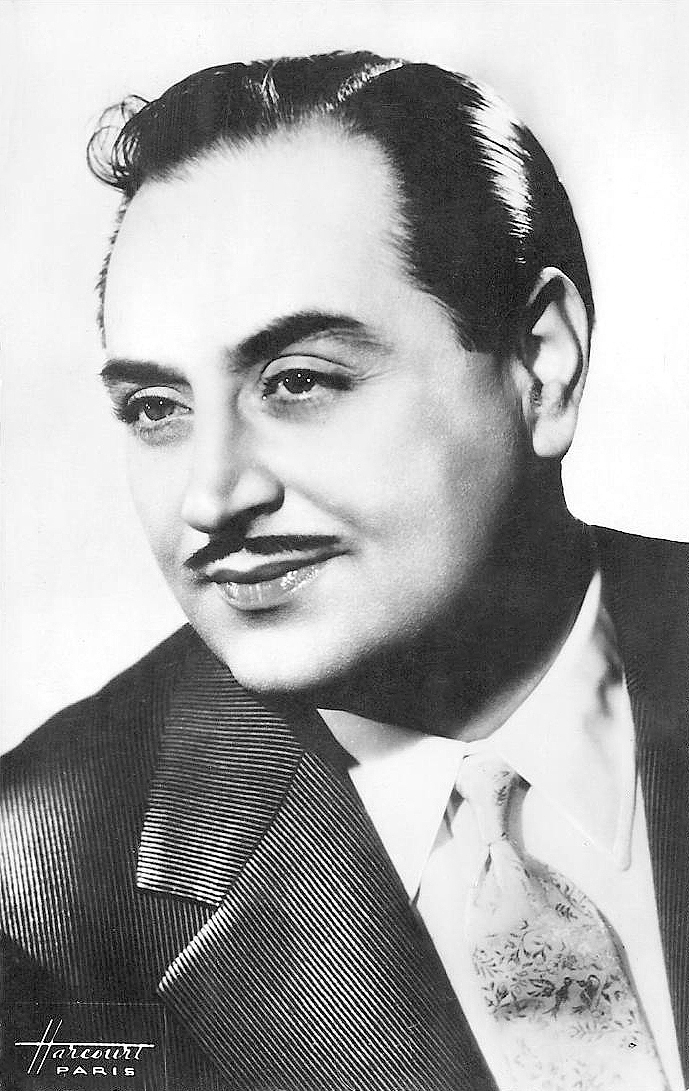
Dario Moreno

Art and cultural life gained new dimensions with the changes brought about by the 1923 formation of the Turkish Republic. It was a period of rapid transformation and its effects were widespread. Turkish women had finally won the freedom to appear on the stage, breaking the monopoly previously held by Rûm (Istanbul Greek) and Armenian women who performed in musical and non-musical theatre. Institutions like Darulbedayi (Istanbul City Theatre) and Darulelhan (Istanbul Conservatory of Music) had long been turning out trained artists.

Eventually kanto became more of a definition, a generalized genre than a musical term. Any tune that was outside of the day's musical conventions, anything light that appealed to current trends and tastes, was labeled kanto. Any music played with different instruments that was free rhythmic or somehow novel was labeled kanto; it was the product of the middie-class, urban culture of Istanbul. Kanto has been viewed as a forerunner of today's pop culture.

== Folk music ==
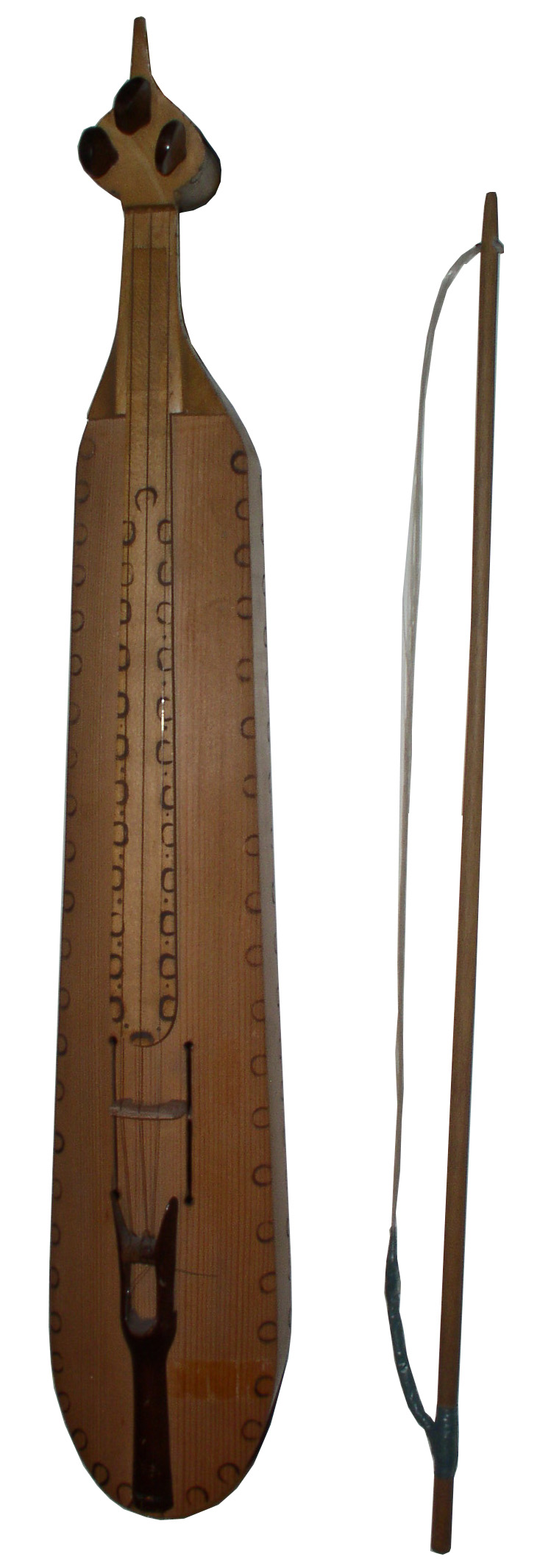
Kemençe is a popular folk music instrument on Turkey's Black Sea coast

Folk music or Türkü generally deals with subjects surrounding daily life in less grandiose terms than the love and emotion usually contained in its traditional counterpart, Ottoman court music.

Most songs recount stories of real-life events and Turkish folklore, or have developed through song contests between troubadour poets. Corresponding to their origins, folk songs are usually played at weddings, funerals and special festivals.

Regional folk music generally accompanies folk dances, which vary significantly across regions. For example, at marriage ceremonies in the Aegean guests will dance the Zeybek, while in other Rumeli regions the upbeat dance music Çiftetelli is usually played, and in the southeastern regions of Turkey the Halay is the customary form of local wedding music and dance. Greeks from Thrace and Cyprus that have adopted çiftetelli music sometimes use it synonymously to mean Oriental dance, which indicates a misunderstanding of its roots. Çiftetelli is a folk dance, differing from a solo performance dance of a hired entertainer.

The regional mood also affects the subject of the folk songs, e.g. folk songs from the Black Sea are lively in general and express the customs of the region. Songs about betrayal have an air of defiance about them instead of sadness, whereas the further south travelled in Turkey the more the melodies resemble a lament.

As this genre is viewed as a music of the people, musicians in socialist movements began to adapt folk music with contemporary sounds and arrangements in the form of protest music.

In the 70s and 80s, modern bards following the aşık tradition such as Aşik Veysel and Mahsuni Şerif moved away from spiritual invocations to socio-politically active lyrics.

Other contemporary progenitors took their lead such as Zülfü Livaneli, known for his mid-80s innovation of combining poet Nazım Hikmet's radical poems with folk music and rural melodies, and is well regarded by left-wing supporters in politics.

In more recent times, saz orchestras, accompanied with many other traditional instruments and a merger with arabesque melodies have kept modern folk songs popular in Turkey.

=== Classical & Folk instruments ===
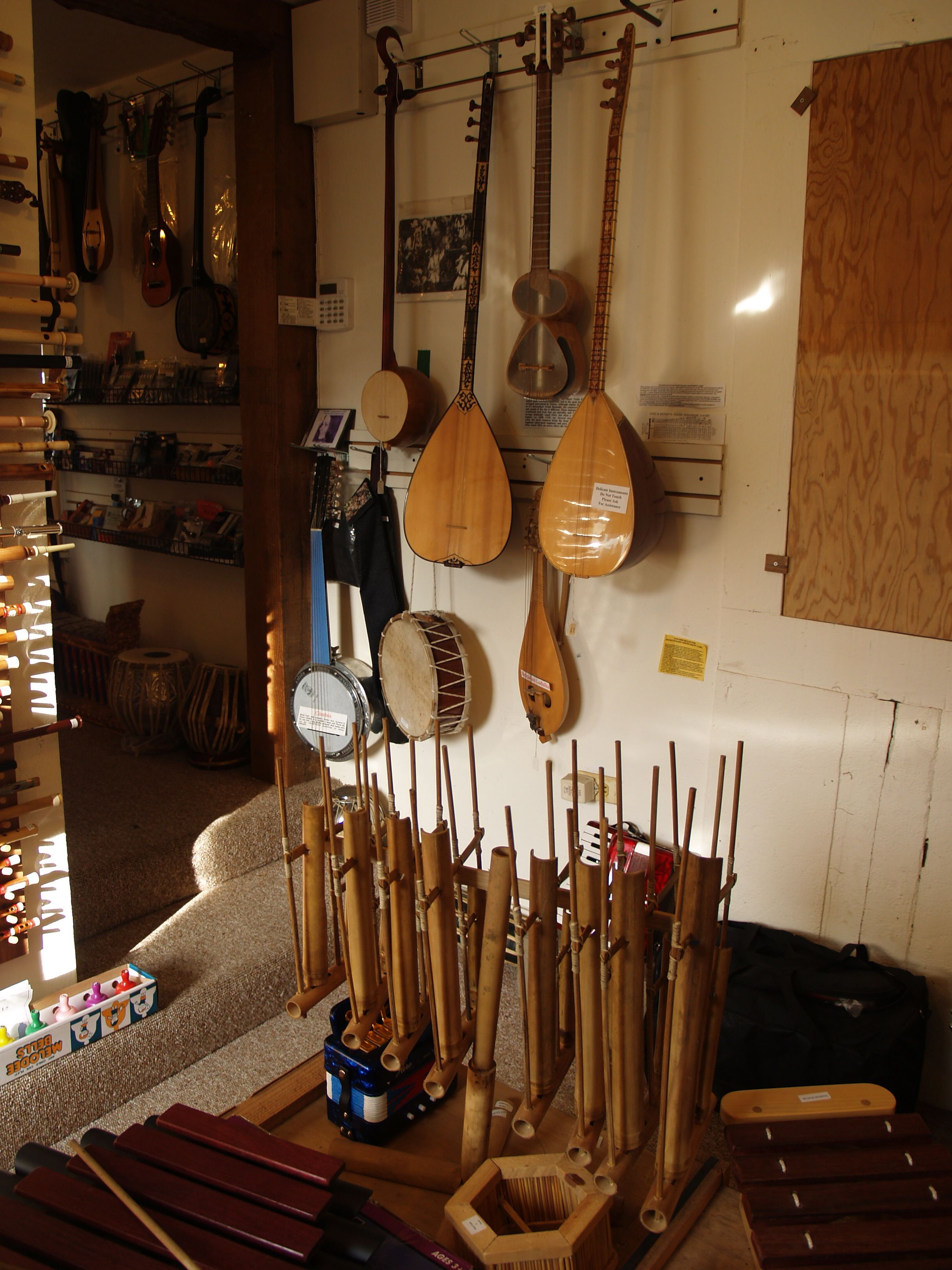
Selection of Accordion, Bağlama, Cümbüş and Ud

Folk instruments range from string groups as bağlama, bow instruments such as the kemençe (a type of stave fiddle), and percussion and wind, including the zurna, ney and davul. Regional variations place importance on different instruments, e.g. the darbuka in Rumeli and the kemençe around the Eastern Black Sea region. The folklore of Turkey is extremely diverse. Nevertheless, Turkish folk music is dominantly marked by a single musical instrument called saz or bağlama, a type of long-necked lute. Traditionally, saz is played solely by traveling musicians known as ozan or religious Alevi troubadours called aşık.

Due to the cultural crossbreeding prevalent during the Ottoman Empire, the bağlama has influenced various cultures in the Eastern Mediterranean, e.g. the Greek baglamas. In Turkish bağlamak means 'to tie' as a reference to the tied, movable frets of the instrument. Like many other plucked lutes, it can be played with a plectrum (i.e., pick), with a fingerpicking style, or strummed with the backs of fingernails. The zurna and davul duo is also popular in rural areas, and played at weddings and other local celebrations.

Instruments in Turkish classical music include tambur, long-necked plucked lute, ney end-blown flute, oud plucked short-necked unfretted lute, kanun plucked zither, violin, and in Mevlevi music, küdüm drum and a harp.

=== Folk literature ===
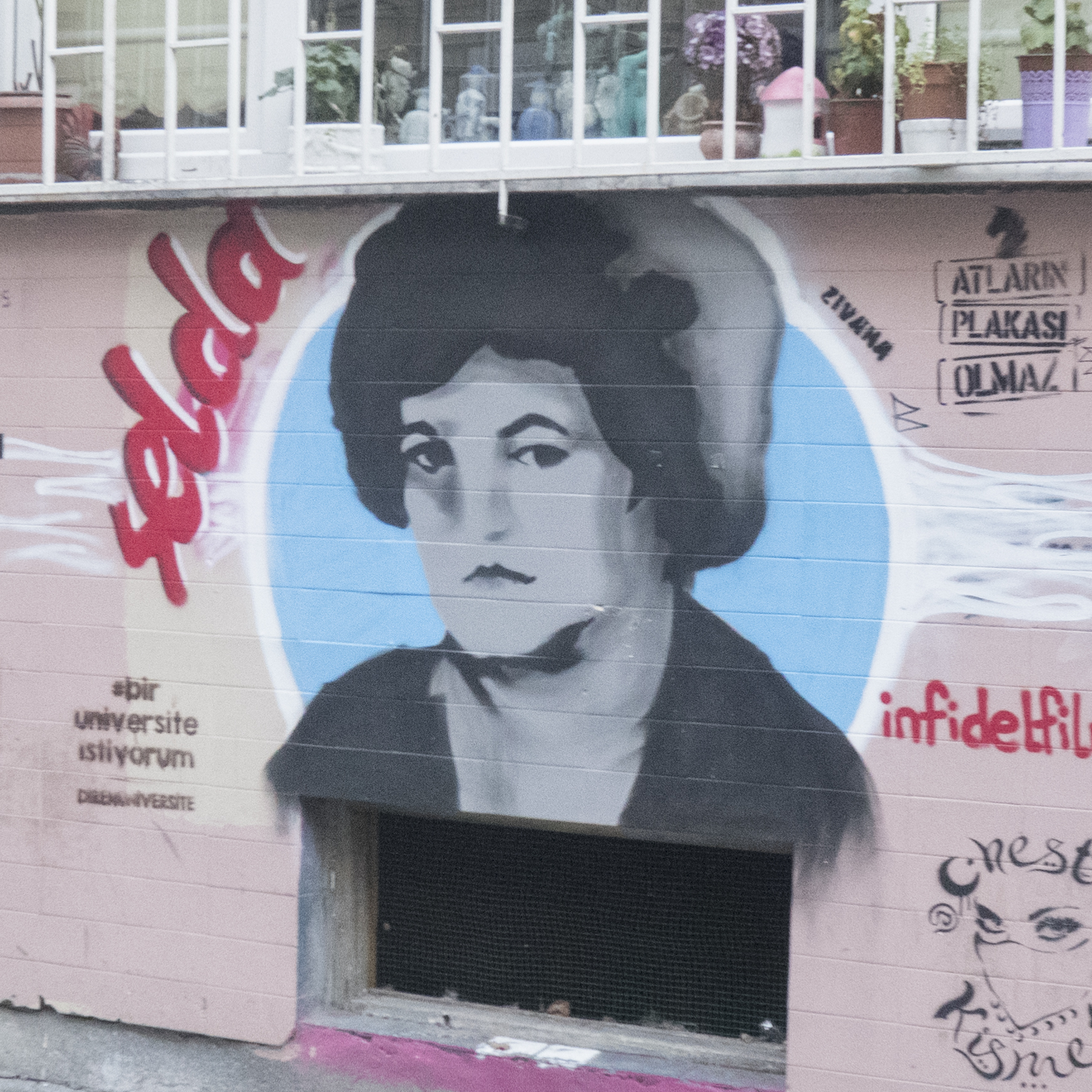
A mural of Selda Bağcan, who fuses folk elements with groove and protest music

A large body of folk songs are derived from minstrels or bard-poets called ozan in Turkish. They have been developing Turkish folk literature since the beginning of 11th century. The musical instrument used by these bard-poets is the saz or bağlama. They are often taught by other senior minstrels, learning expert idioms, procedures, and methods in the performance of the art. These lessons often take place at minstrel meetings and the coffeehouses they frequent. Those bard-poets who become experts or alaylı then take apprentices for themselves and continue the tradition.

A minstrel's creative output usually takes two major forms. One, in musical rhyming contests with other bards, where the competition ends with the defeat of the minstrel who cannot find an appropriate quatrain to the rhyme and two, storytelling. These folk stories are extracted from real life, folklore, dreams and legends. One of the most well-known followings are those bards that put the title aşık in front of their names.

=== Arabesque ===
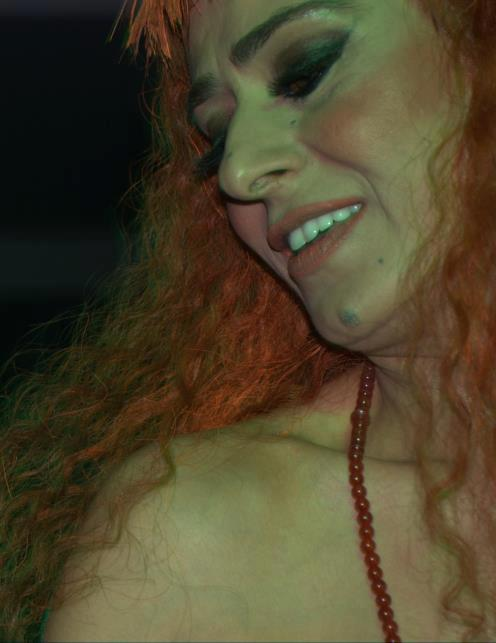
Yıldız Tilbe, a prominent arabesque singer

Arabic music had been banned in Turkey in 1948, but starting in the 1970s immigration from predominantly southeastern rural areas to big cities and particularly to Istanbul gave rise to a new cultural synthesis. This changed the musical makeup of Istanbul. The old tavernas and music halls of fasıl music were to shut down in place of a new type of music. These new urban residents brought their own taste of music, which due to their locality was largely middle eastern. Musicologists derogatively termed this genre as arabesque due to the high-pitched wailing that is synonymous with Arabic singing.

After the coup d'etat in 1980, Arabesque music was seen by the government as having a negative effect on the Turkish people, so Arabesque artists were not featured on the national broadcast, TRT. Even with this ban in place, its mainstream popularity rose so much in the 1980s that it even threatened the existence of Turkish pop, with rising stars such as Müslüm Gürses and İbrahim Tatlıses. The genre has underbeat forms that include Ottoman forms of belly-dancing music known as fantazi from singers like Gülben Ergen and with performers like Serdar Ortaç who added Anglo-American rock and roll to arabesque music.

It is not really accurate to group Arabesk with folk music. It owes little to folk music, and would be more accurately described as form of popular music based on the makam scales found in Ottoman and Turkish classical music. Though Arabesk was accused of having been derived from Arabic music, the scales (makam) used identify it as music, that, though influenced by both Arabic and Western music, is much more Turkish in origin.

=== Religious music ===
==== Islamic Recitation & Anasheed ====
"Islamic Recitation," a term associated with mainstream religion in Turkey, includes the azan (call-to-prayer), Kur'an-ı Kerim (Koran recitation), Mevlit (Ascension Poem), and ilahi (hymns usually sung in a group, often outside a mosque). On musical grounds, mosque music in large urban areas often resembles classical Turkish music in its learned use of makam and poetry, e.g., a Mevlit sung at Sultan Ahmet mosque in Istanbul. Dervish/Sufi music is rarely associated with a mosque. Kâni Karaca was a leading performer of mosque music in recent times.

Islamic anasheed was popular among some of the Turkish people in early 2000s. The most popular artist in Turkey is the British Azeri, Sami Yusuf, a concert in Istanbul drew an audience of over 200,000, his biggest concert so far around the world. He is one of the most notable singers of anasheed, and can speak in many different languages, which includes Turkish. To date he has performed at sell out concerts in over 30 countries across the world from Istanbul to Casablanca, United States to Germany. Some albums selling more than a million copies in comparison to western music. In Jan 2009 Sami travelled to Turkey where he was invited by Emine Erdoğan, wife of the Turkish Prime Minister Recep Tayyip Erdoğan, to attend a rally in support of peace in Gaza. Another popular Turkish singer is Feridun Özdemir, who mainly sings of God and true faith. His records are most successful in the anasheed genre.

==== Alevi influences: The Aşık (Ashik) traditions ====
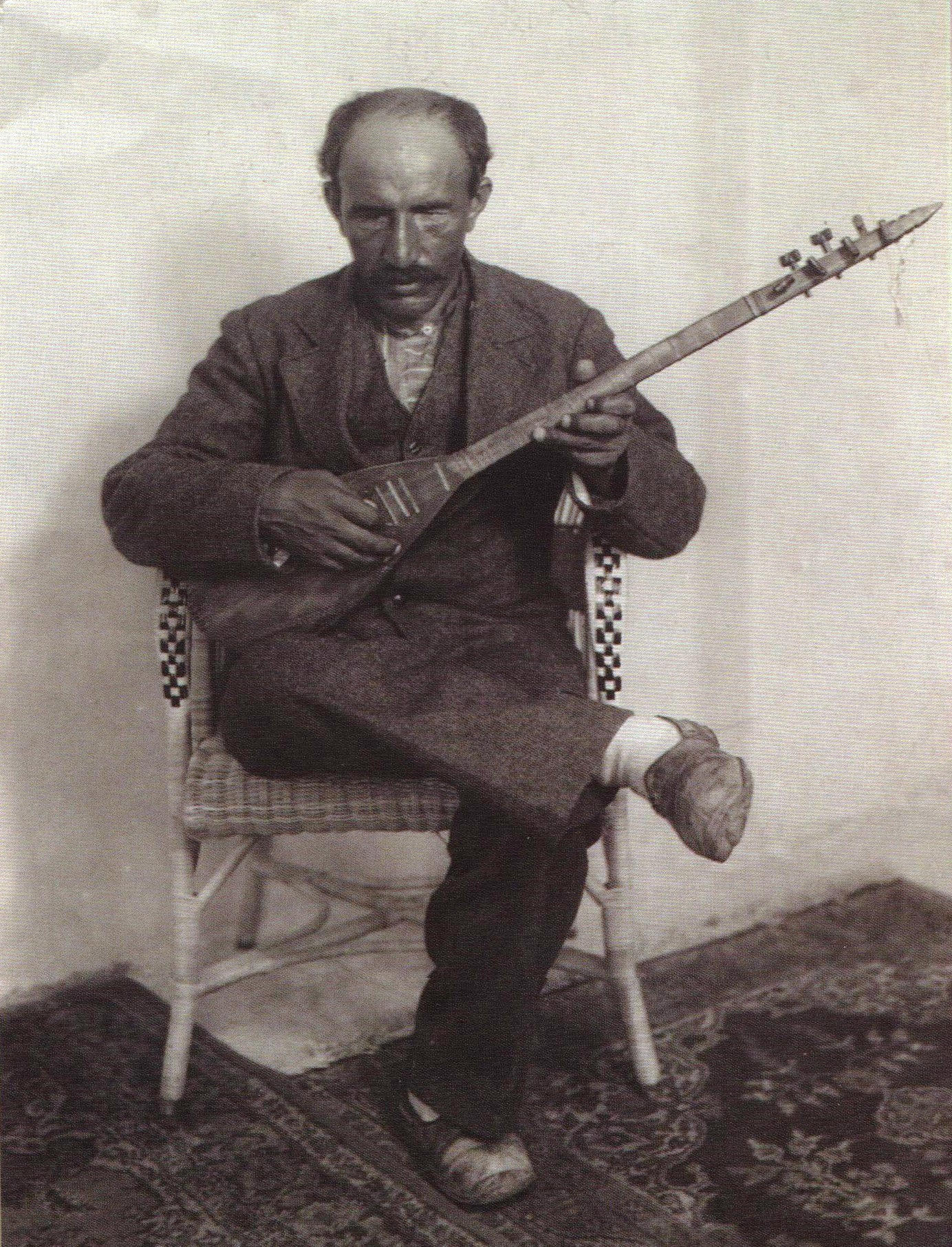
Aşık Veysel

It is suggested that about a fifth of the Turkish population are Alevis, whose folk music is performed by a type of travelling bard or ozan called aşık, who travels with the saz or baglama, an iconic image of Turkish folk music. These songs, which hail from the central northeastern area, are about mystical revelations, invocations to Alevi saints and Muhammad's son-in-law, Ali, whom they hold in high esteem. In Turkish aşık literally means 'in love'. Whoever follows this tradition has the Aşık assignation put before their names, because it is suggested that music becomes an essential facet of their being, for example as in Aşık Veysel.

Middle Anatolia is home to the bozlak, a type of declamatory, partially improvised music by the bards. Neşet Ertaş has so far been the most prominent contemporary voice of Middle Anatolian music, singing songs of a large spectrum, including works of premodern Turkoman aşıks like Karacaoğlan and Dadaloğlu and the modern aşıks like his father, the late Muharrem Ertaş. Around the city of Sivas, aşık music has a more spiritual bent, afeaturing ritualized song contests, although modern bards have brought it into the political arena.

==== Sufi influences: The Mevlevi traditions ====
Followers of the Mevlevi Order or whirling dervishes are a religious sufi sect unique to Turkey but well known outside of its boundaries.

Dervishes of the Mevlevi sect simply dance a sema by turning continuously to music that consists of long, complex compositions called ayin. These pieces are both preceded and followed by songs using lyrics by the founder and poet Mevlana Jelaleddin Rumi. With the musical instrument known as the ney at the forefront of this music, internationally well-known musicians include Necdet Yasar, Niyazi Sayin, Kudsi Ergüner and Ömer Faruk Tekbilek.

=== Regional folk styles ===
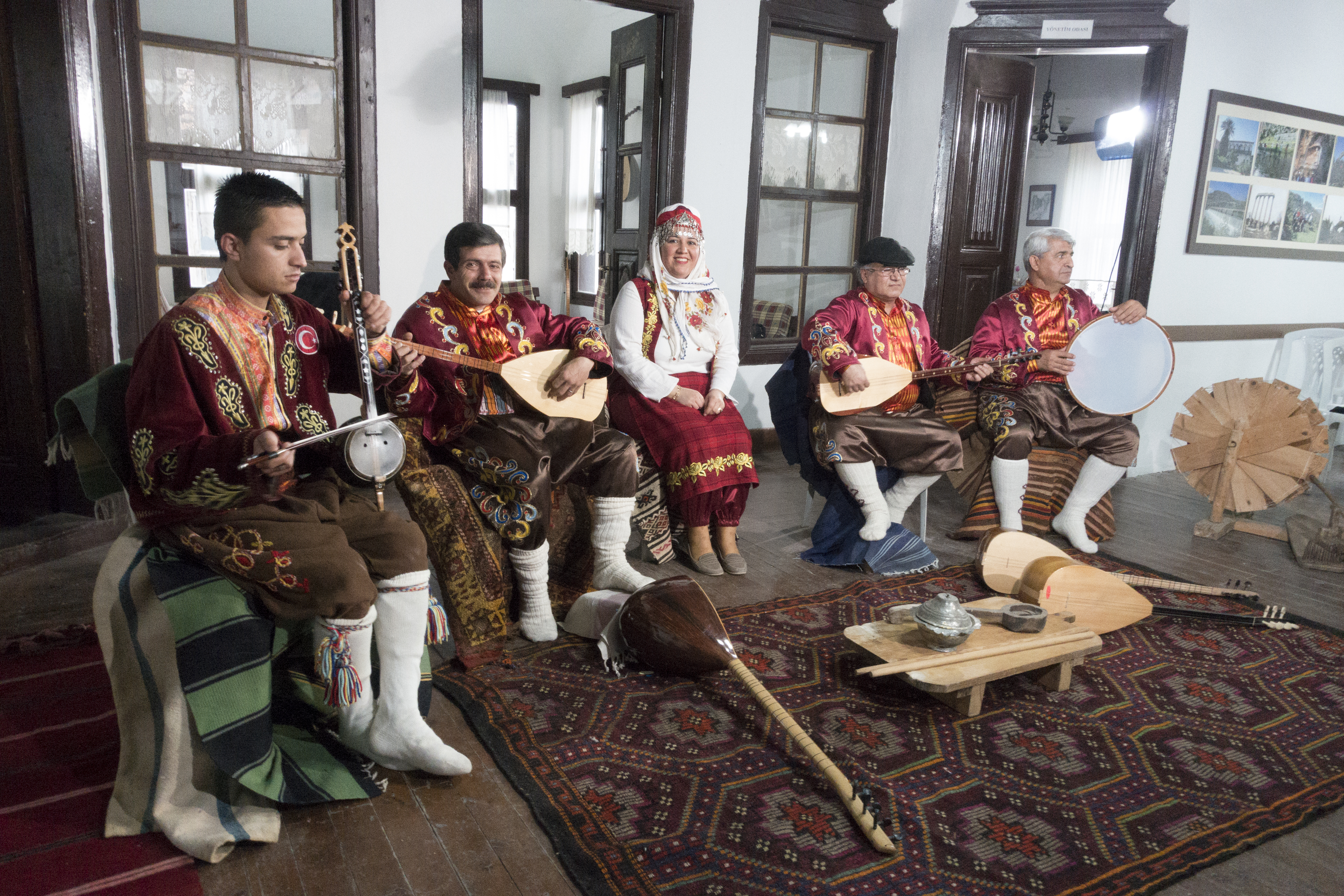
A folk ensemble from Silifke

Minorities and indigenous peoples have added and enhanced Turkish folk styles, while they have adopted Turkish folk traditions and instruments. Folk songs are identifiable and distinguished by regions.

==== Aegean and Rumeli regions ====
Folk songs from Istanbul may have been closely influenced by its locality, which would include Ottoman rakkas and court music. Cities like İzmir share similar motifs, such as the zeybek dance.

==== Black Sea and Caucasus regions ====
Central Asian Turkic peoples from the Caspian Sea and areas have had a huge influence in the purest forms of Turkish folk music, most notably from the Azeris and Karapapakh.

Pontic Greeks on the eastern shore of the Black Sea or Karadeniz regions have their own distinct Greek style of folk music, motifs from which were used with great success by Helena Paparizou. The diaspora of Greek speaking Pontic people from that region introduced Pontic music to Greece after 1924 population exchange between Turkey and Greece. The region's dance style uses unique techniques like odd shoulder tremors and knee bends. Folk dances include the gerasari, trygona, kots, omal, serra, kotsari and tik.

==== Southeastern regions ====
Southeastern regions carry influences from Turkmen music, Zaza motifs and Armenian music. These usually include epic laments.

== Popular music ==
Popular music is distinguished from the traditional genres as those styles that entered the Turkish musicality after the fall of the Ottoman Empire, either due to attempts of national modernization from 1924 onwards, the opening of the republic to Western musical influences or modern fusions and innovations from artists themselves.

=== Mainstream pop ===
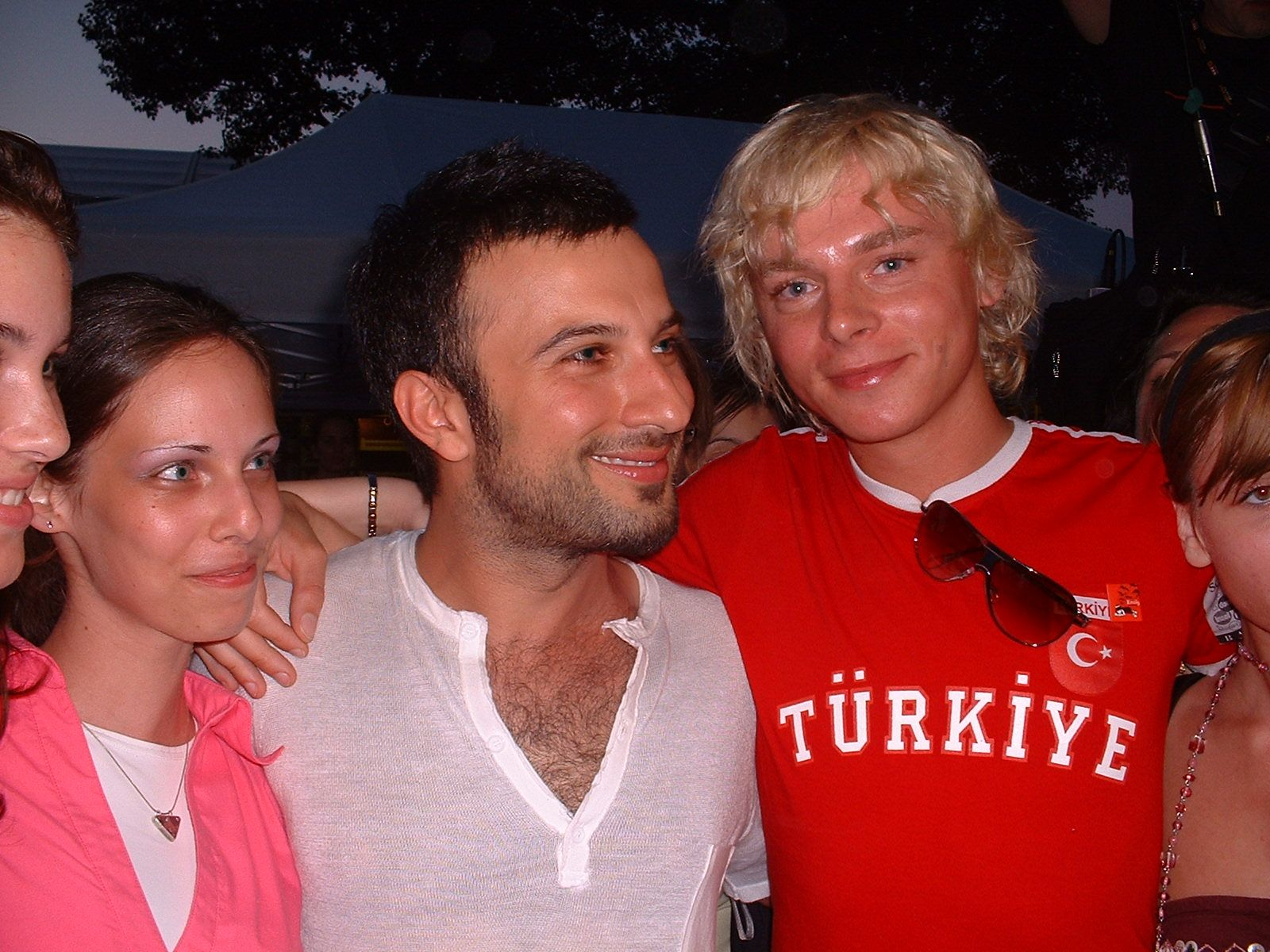
Tarkan in Vienna with fans from Hungary

Turkish pop music had its humble beginnings in the late 1950s with Turkish cover versions of a wide range of imported popular styles, including rock and roll, tango, and jazz. As more styles emerged, they were also adopted, such as hip-hop, heavy metal and reggae.

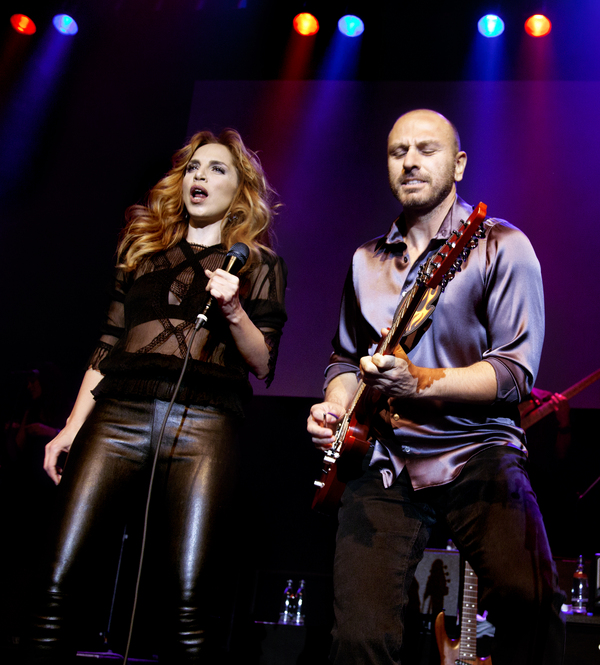
Sertab Erener, 2003 Eurovision winner, with Demir Demirkan

The self-named "superstar" of the "arrangement" (aranjman) era of the 70s was Ajda Pekkan and Aydzhan Bekir who also debuted, along with Enrico Macias, at Olympia, Paris, while MFÖ (Mazhar, Fuat, Özkan) was a pop group that mixed Western and Turkish musical elements. Another prominent Turkish pop singer is Sezen Aksu. She contributed to the development of the Turkish pop sound of this period. She also advocated for Turkey to enter the Eurovision Song Contest. Her one-time vocalist and later protégé Sertab Erener won the contest in 2003.

The biggest male pop stars in Turkey are arguably Tarkan, Mustafa Sandal, Cem Adrian, Emre Altuğ and Kenan Doğulu. Tarkan achieved chart success in Europe and Latin America with his single "Şımarık", also composed by Sezen Aksu, which has been covered by numerous artists. Mustafa Sandal has also enjoyed chart success in Europe with his 2005 single "İsyankar", which peaked at number 4 and went gold. Female stars include Hande Yener, Nil Karaibrahimgil and Hadise, who participated in Eurovision and enjoyed international recognition, especially in Europe.

=== Turkish hip-hop ===
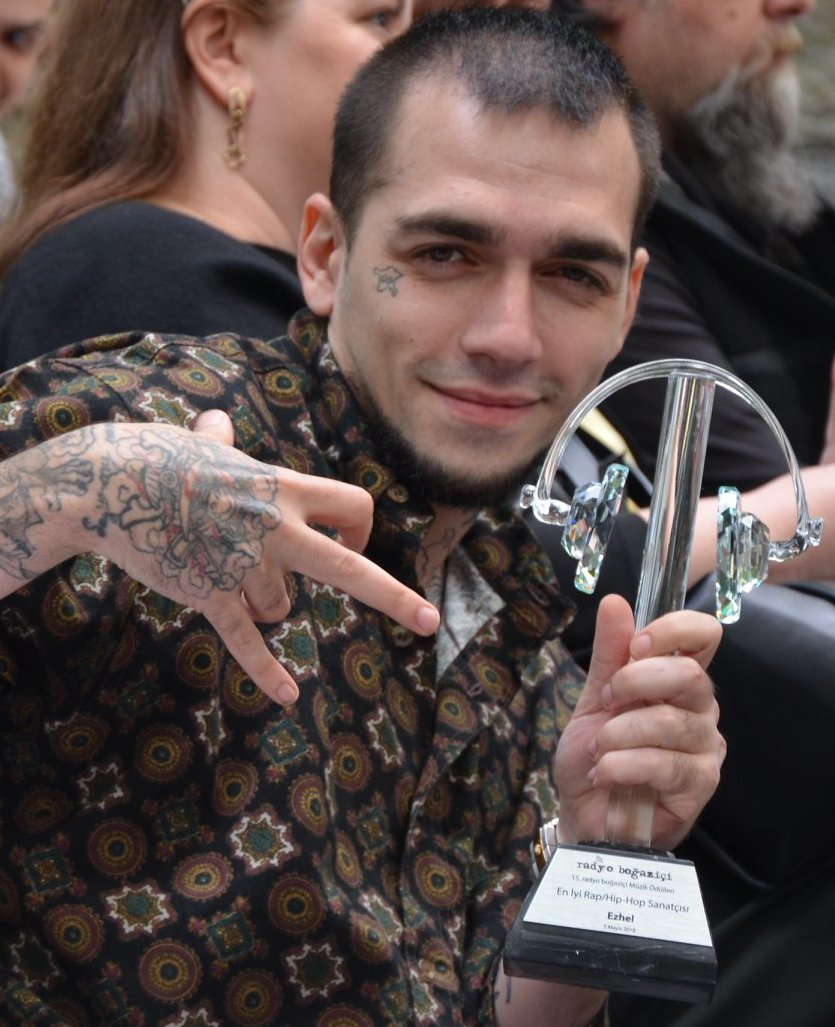
Ezhel

Turkish hip-hop or oriental hip-hop is a creation of the Turkish migrant worker community in Germany, which some suggest was a suitable outlet for a young generation disillusioned with Germany's treatment of its migrant class. In 1995, the Turkish-German community produced a major hip-hop crew named Cartel which caused controversy in Turkey and Germany for its revolutionary lyrics. Hip-hop now enjoys wide popularity among the younger generation in Turkey. Ceza, Dr. Fuchs (formerly "Nefret"), Fuat Ergin and Sagopa Kajmer were spearheads of the genre. Sansar Salvo, Pit10, Şehinşah, Hayki, Saian, Allâme are popular figures of second wave contemporary rap music in Turkey. New generation or 'Drill' include Ezhel, UZI, Ben Fero and LVBEL C5.

=== Anatolian rock ===
The Turkish rock scene began in the early 1960s, when popular United States and United Kingdom bands became well known. Soon, a distinctively Turkish fusion of rock and folk emerged; this was called Anatolian rock, a term which nowadays may not be generically ascribed to most of Turkish rock. Barış Manço, Cem Karaca and Erkin Koray are the best known performers; Moğollar and Kurtalan Ekspres are the best known groups of older classical Anatolian rock music.

=== Heavy metal and industrial ===
Heavy metal and industrial groups from Turkey include Pentagram (known as Mezarkabul outside Turkey) and Almora. Individual musicians in these genres include Ogün Sanlısoy and Hayko Cepkin.

=== Underground black metal and death metal ===
Underground black metal and death metal bands known from Turkey are Witchtrap, Ehrimen, Satanized, Godslaying Hellblast, Burial Invocation, Deggial, Decaying Purity.

=== Pop-rock and rock ===
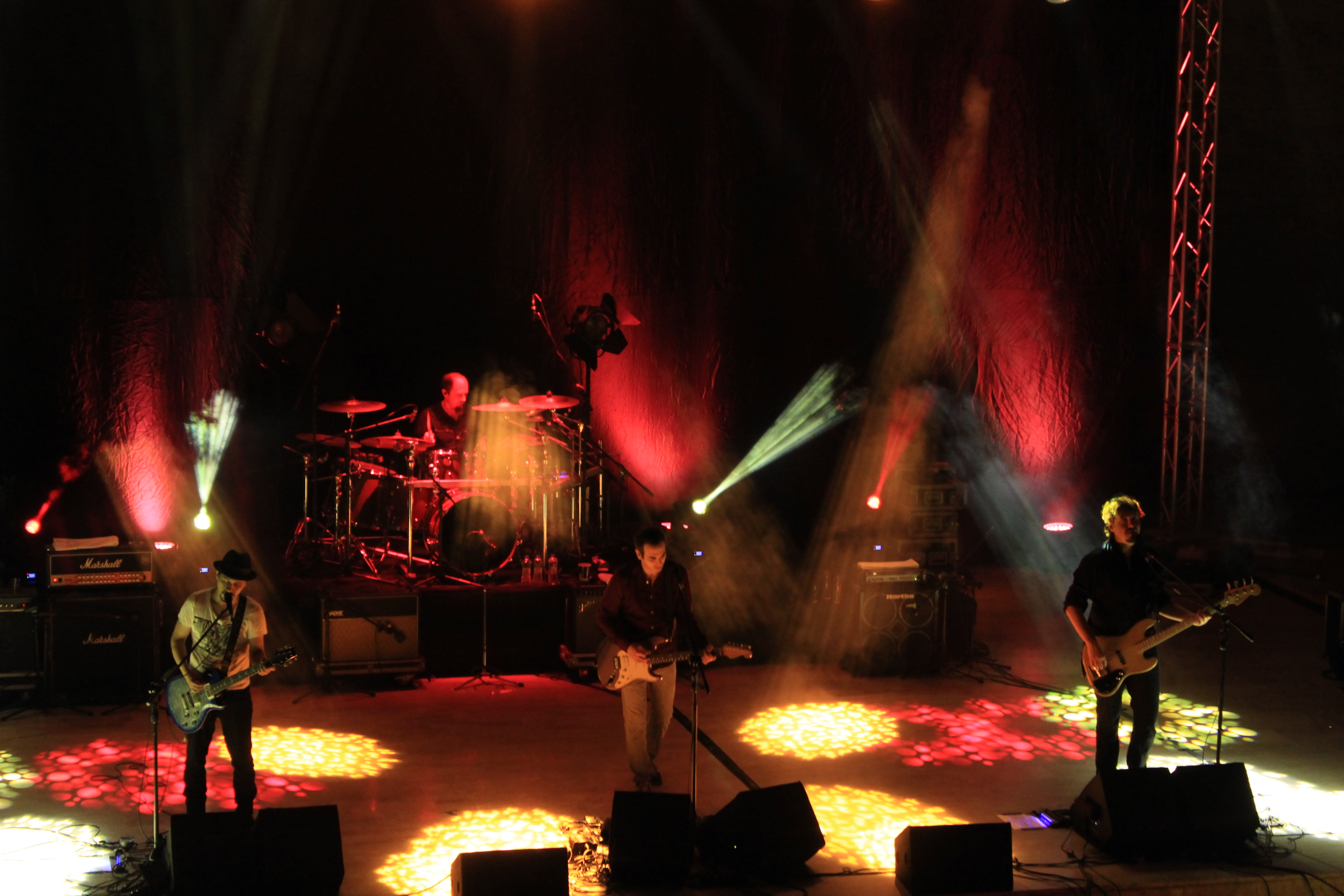
Mor ve Ötesi

As a student amidst popular currents in the early-1970s, Bülent Ortaçgil appeared as an urban songwriter/musician with a distinct musical quality. He was the only Turkish musician for whom a tribute album was compiled that included several prominent performers from a wide gamut of different genres.

Other recent rock bands with a more Western sound who have enjoyed mainstream success include maNga, Duman and Mor ve Ötesi. Şebnem Ferah, Özlem Tekin and Teoman are examples of individual rock artists with substantial fan bases. Turkey also boasts numerous large-scale rock festivals and events. Annual rock festivals in Turkey include Barışarock, H2000 Music Festival, Rock'n Coke, and RockIstanbul.

=== Turkish Trance ===
Trance is a rare musical genre in Turkey but it also has specific listeners. This genre gained when the first Turkish trance music composed by Murtaza Khojami and the song named for Yalnızlık Düşünceler with mixed criticism. Contemporary figures include Oceanvs Orientalis and Hey! Douglas

=== Turkish Jazz ===
This is a list of notable Turkish Jazz musician.

- Ayten Alpman
- Atilla Engin
- Fatih Erkoç
- Aydın Esen
- Hayati Kafe
- Ferit Odman
- İlham Gencer
- Muvaffak "Maffy" Falay
- Okay Temiz
- Timuçin Şahin

=== Underground and club music ===
There are many clubs across Turkey, especially across its Aegean region. The alternative music scene however is derived mostly from Istanbul's thriving underground club scene that sees DJs merging the past with the present, using traditional motifs with new age sounds and electronic music. Mercan Dede is one of Turkey's most successful DJs, mixing trance with historical and mystic Sufi songs. Another worldwide recognized name from the underground music scene of Turkey is Mert Yücel. Yücel was responsible for the first house music album to be released in Turkey. He also had worldwide acclaimed and respected releases on US and UK dance labels. He is one of the key names defining the underground house sound emerging from Istanbul. Contemporary figures include Mahmut Orhan, Burak Yeter, Ummet Ozcan and 808.oguz

=== Musical influence of immigrants ===
The influx of immigrants and refugees from Balkans, Central Asian, Greater Middle East, and African countries has affected the Turkish musical landscape, particularly in Istanbul. Bands such as Country for Syria, and Saktat explicitly blend the music of different refugee communities in Istanbul to create a mix of Turkish, Arab, Greek, Persian, and Western influences. Busking has played an important role in the development of this style.

== Music industry ==
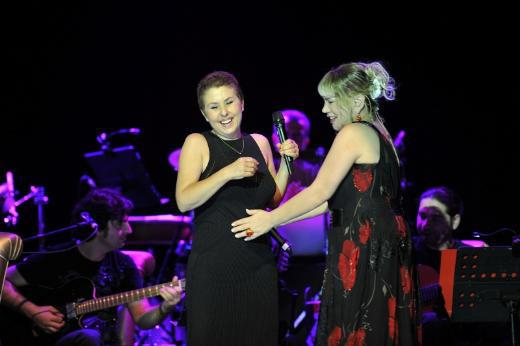
Nilüfer and Sezen Aksu, an influential figure in the industry

The Turkish music industry includes a number of fields, ranging from record companies to radio stations and community and state orchestras. Most of the major record companies are based in Istanbul's region of Unkapanı and they are represented by the Turkish Phonographic Industry Society (MÜ-YAP). The major record companies produce material by artists that have signed to one of their record labels, a brand name often associated with a particular genre or record producer. Record companies may also promote and market their artists, through advertising, public performances and concerts, and television appearances.

In recent years, the music industry has been embroiled in turmoil over the rise of the Internet downloading of copyrighted music and general piracy; many musicians and MÜ-YAP have sought to punish fans who illegally download copyrighted music. On 13 June 2006 it was reported that MÜ-YAP and The Orchard, the world's leading distributor and marketer of independent music, had reached an agreement on digital global distribution, representing approximately 80% of the Turkish music market.

Until 2010s, There wasn't a substantial singles market in Turkey. It is album orientated, although popular singers such as Yonca Evcimik and Tarkan have released singles with success. Most music charts not related to album sales, measure popularity by music video feedback and radio airplay.

Turkish radio stations often broadcast popular music. Each music station has a format, or a category of songs to be played; these are generally similar to but not the same as ordinary generic classification. With the introduction of commercial radio and television in the early 1990s ending the monopoly of the Turkish Radio and Television Corporation (TRT), a multitude of radio and TV stations were opened by newspaper media moguls. These media chains sponsor award ceremonies such as the Kral TV awards for music, but most accredited music awards are based on sales given out by industry societies such as MÜ-YAP and the Magazine Journalists Society (MJS).

Though major record companies dominate the Turkish industry, an independent music industry (indie music) does exist. Indie music is mostly based around local record labels with limited, if any, retail distribution outside a small region. Artists sometimes record for an indie label and gain enough acclaim to be signed to a major label; others choose to remain at an indie label for their entire careers. Indie music may be in styles generally similar to mainstream music, but is often inaccessible, unusual or otherwise unappealing to many people. Indie musicians often release some or all of their songs over the Internet for fans and others to download and listen to.

Perhaps the most successful Turkish name associated with indie music outside of Turkey is Ahmet Ertegun of Atlantic Records. His promotion of some of the most famous R&B and soul artists in North America and his contribution to the American music industry has earned a place in Rock and Roll Hall of Fame, together with his brother Nesuhi.

== Music education ==
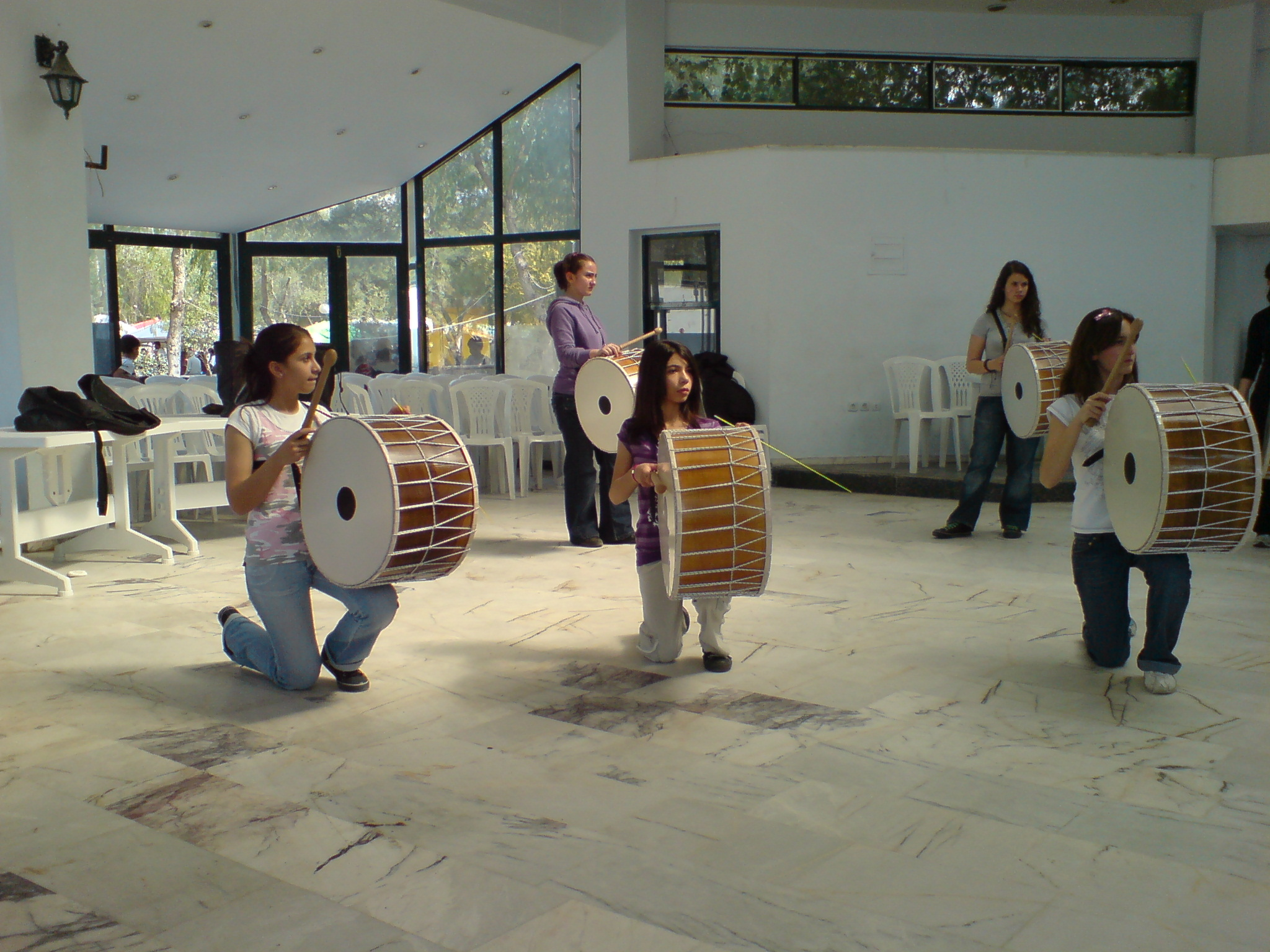
Students learning drums

Music has a place in education in Turkey, and is a part of most or all school systems in the country. High schools generally offer classes in singing, mostly choral, and instrumentation in the form of a large school band or social clubs and communities for Turkish classical or folk music, known as cemiyets. Music may also be a part of theatrical productions put on by a school's drama department. Many public and private schools have sponsored music clubs and groups, most commonly including the marching band that performs Mehter marches at school festivals. However, class time given to music in schools is restricted.

Higher education in the field of music in Turkey is mostly based around large universities, connected to state music academies and conservatories. A conservatory is usually a department of a university, not a separate institution. While many students join conservatories at the usual university entrance age, some conservatories also include a 'Lise' (Lycee), in effect a specialist music school for children aged 14 to 18 years. Conservatories often have a musicology department, and do research on many styles of music especially the Turkish traditional genres, while also keeping a database of sounds in their sound libraries.

== Holidays and festivals ==
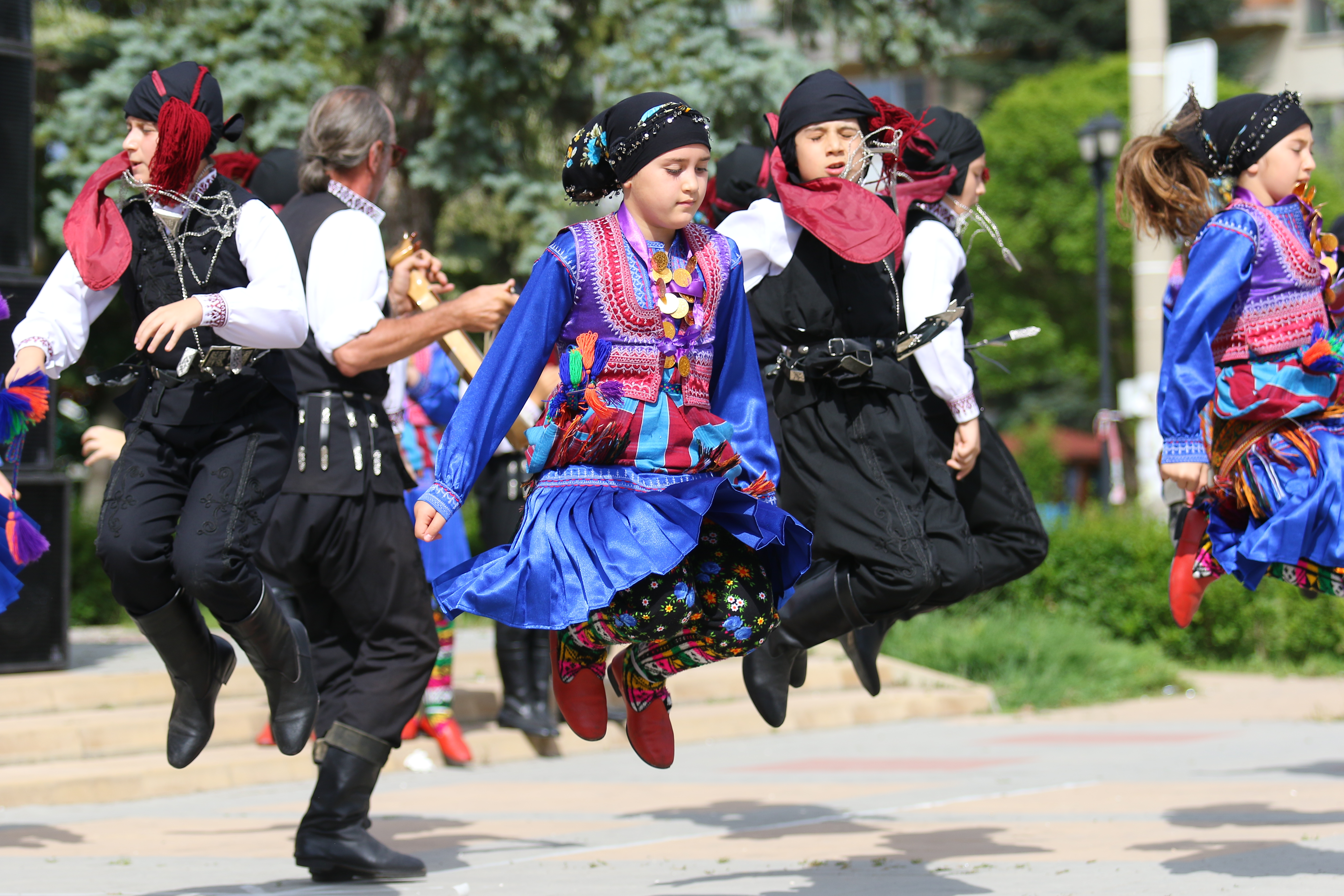
Children's folklore ensemble from Turkey during a festival.

Music is an important part of several Turkish holidays and festivals, especially playing a major part in the springtime celebration of Newroz and religious festivities such as Ramadan. New year is a traditional time for the belly dancer and weddings are celebrated with upbeat tunes, while funerals are mourned with musical laments. Patriotic songs like the national anthem, "The Independence March", are a major part of public holiday celebrations such as National Independence & International Children's Day celebrations on 23 April and 30 August Victory Day celebrations, a holiday that marks Turkish independence. Music also plays a role at many regional festivals that aren't celebrated nationwide, for example a music and dance parade and festival in Zonguldak.

Istanbul, Ankara and İzmir are also home to numerous music festivals which showcase styles ranging from the blues and jazz to indie rock and heavy metal. Some music festivals are strictly local in scope, including few or no performers with a national reputation, and are generally operated by local promoters. Recently large soft drink companies have operated their own music festivals, such as Rock'n Coke and Fanta parties, which draw huge crowds.

== Notable people ==
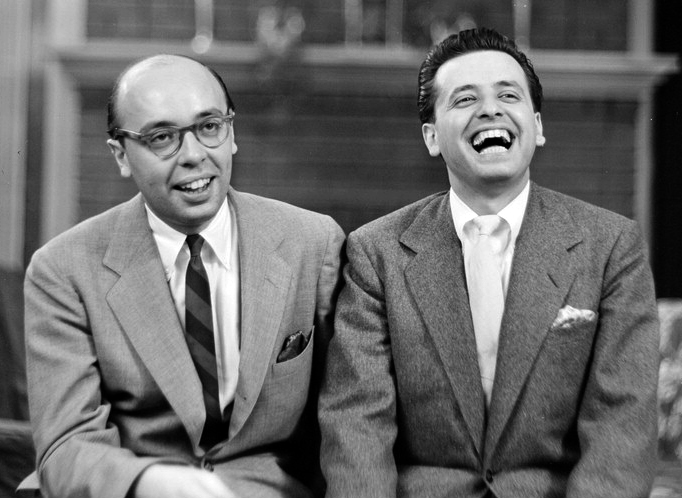
The Ertegüns, founders of Atlantic Records

- Emre Araci
- İdil Biret
- Wojciech Bobowski
- Ahmet Ertegün
- Nesuhi Ertegün
- Oruç Güvenç
- Toygar Işıklı
- Gülçin Yahya Kaçar
- Arif Mardin
- Erkan Oğur
- Fazıl Say
- Pekinel sisters
- Cem Tuncer
- Baba Zula

== See also ==
- Istanbul Jazz Festival
- Jazz in Turkey, 2013 documentary film
- List of Turkish composers
- List of Turkish musicians
- List of music festivals in Turkey
- List of Turks in world culture
- Turkey in the Eurovision Song Contest
- Türkvizyon Song Contest 2013
