= List of Turkish composers =

This is a chronological list of notable composers of the Republic of Turkey.

- Hammamizade İsmail Dede Efendi (1778–1846)
- Abdülaziz (1830–1876)
- Murad V (1840–1904)
- Leyla Saz (1850–1936)
- Fehime Sultan (1875–1929)
- The Turkish Five
- Cemal Reşit Rey (1904–1985), symphonic music, operas, chamber music, operettas and musicals
- Ulvi Cemal Erkin (1906–1972), symphonic music, choral music, solo piano, chamber music
- Ahmed Adnan Saygun (1907–1991), symphonic music, oratorio, choral music, chamber music, opera, ballet music
- Bülent Arel (1919–1990)
- İlhan Usmanbaş (1921–2025)
- Ertuğrul Oğuz Fırat (1923–2014)
- Nevit Kodallı (1925–2009) symphonic music
- İlhan Mimaroğlu (1926–2012)
- Ferit Tüzün (1929-1977)
- Pınar Köksal (1946–2019)
- Aydın Esen (born 1962)
- Gülçin Yahya Kaçar (born 1966)
- Özkan Manav (born 1967)
- Emre Aracı (born 1968)
- Fazıl Say (born 1970)
- Füsun Köksal (born 1973)
- Evrim Demirel (born 1977)
- Oğuzhan Balcı (born 1977)
- Zeynep Gedizlioğlu (born 1977)
- Mehmet Erhan Tanman (born 1989)
