= İlhan Usmanbaş =

Turkish composer (1921–2025)

- İlhan Usmanbaş, c. 1970
- Born: 23 October 1921; Istanbul, Ottoman Empire
- Died: 30 January 2025 (aged 103); Istanbul, Turkey
- Resting place: Zincirlikuyu Cemetery
- Education: Ankara State Conservatory; Istanbul State Conservatory
- Occupations: Composer; Academic teacher
- Spouse: Atıfet Usmanbaş (m. 1948; died 2022)
- Awards: State Artist

İlhan Usmanbaş (23 October 1921 – 30 January 2025) was a Turkish contemporary classical composer who was trained and recognised internationally. He was of the "second generation" of Turkish composers, who integrated European techniques into Turkish music. He served as director of first the Ankara State Conservatory and then the Istanbul State Conservatory, influencing generations of students.

== Life and career ==
=== Early years and education ===
Born in Istanbul on 23 October 1921, Usmanbaş grew up in Ayvalık. When he was twelve years old, his elder brother gave him a cello, and İlhan began to teach himself to play. After moving back to Istanbul, he studied the cello seriously. His maths teacher, a lover of music, advised Usmanbaş to give up the career that he had planned for himself: "We have enough engineers in Turkey. You should be a composer instead."

After graduating from Galatasaray High School in 1941, Usmanbaş entered first the Faculty of Letters at Istanbul University to study philosophy, but switched to the Conservatory of Istanbul where he studied harmony with Cemal Reşit Rey and cello with Sezai Asal. In 1942, he transferred to Ankara State Conservatory, where he went on to study in the Department of Musical Composition, under members of the Turkish Five – Rey, Ahmet Adnan Saygun, Hasan Ferit Alnar, Ulvi Cemal Erkin, and Necil Kazım Akses – and David Zirkin. While he was still a student, he composed his first orchestral work Little Night Music (1946), inspired by Mozart. At the time, he discovered the score of Alban Berg's Wozzeck in the library, and started to study and perform the works of other contemporary composers. In 1948, Usmanbaş graduated in composition from Ankara State Conservatory.

In 1952, he was among the founders of the Helikon Derneği, an association named after the Greek mythological Mt. Helicon, to promote arts like visual arts and music. The same year, he went to the United States on a UNESCO scholarship, where he came under the influence of American pioneers of new and experimental music. He studied in Tanglewood and Bennington with Luigi Dallapiccola. In 1955, he received the Paul Fromm Award.

=== Teaching and composing ===
In 1956, Usmanbaş served as a lecturer for music history at Ankara State Conservatory. In the years 1957 and 1958, he was again in the United States on a Rockefeller fellowship, where he had the opportunity to meet many composers, including Milton Babbitt, Henry Cowell and Morton Feldman.

He developed as a composer: until 1948, he was influenced by Paul Hindemith, Béla Bartók and Igor Stravinsky. In the 1950s he added serial techniques. After 1960, he included aleatoric music, free polyphony, sound collage, minimal music, monorhythms, micromodality and graphic free values.

Usmanbaş was an experimental composer, one of the second generation of Turkish composers, coming after the Five, and opposed to their ideas. He worked with a freedom of form and a concentration on intensity rather than melody, with techniques that include neo-classicism, aleatoric music, Twelve-tone technique, serialism, and minimalism. He wrote nearly 120 compositions.

Usmanbaş published books and translations, and wrote congress programs and articles during his long years as a lecturer of musical composition. He translated works in to Turkish, especially André Hodeir's Les Formes de la Musique as Müzik Türleri Ve Biçimleri , and Short History of World Music by Curt Sachs as Kısa Dünya Musikisi Tarihi. He became director of first the Ankara State Conservatory and then the Istanbul Conservatory where he was in office until 2011. He influenced generations of students including Fazıl Say. The sheet music collection of Usmanbaş's works is held by the Sevda-Cenap And Music Foundation.

=== Personal life ===
Usmanbaş married the soprano Atıfet (born 1923) in 1948. She died on 3 February 2022 at the age of 99 in a nursing residence that the couple had donated to, and where they had lived for eleven years at the time.

İlhan Usmanbaş died on 30 January 2025 at the age of 103. (Note: Some sources mislabel his age as "104".) He was buried at Zincirlikuyu Cemetery following a memorial ceremony held at the Atatürk Cultural Center.

== Awards ==
Usmanbaş received more foreign awards and honours than any other Turkish composer. He received commissions from the Koussevitzky Foundation in the United States, the Fromm Music Award, the Koussevitzky Award in 1958, the Wieniawski Award in Poland in 1967, the award of the International Competition for Ballet Music in Switzerland in 69, and the prize of the International Composers Tribune in Paris. In 1971, Usmanbaş became a State Artist in Turkey. He received a gold medal from the Sevda–Cenap And Foundation in 1993. Boğaziçi University awarded him an honorary doctorate in 2000. He was presented with a Lifetime Achievement Award at the 32nd Istanbul International Music Festival in 2004.
