= Istanbul University State Conservatory =

The Istanbul University State Conservatory (Turkish: İstanbul Üniversitesi Devlet Konservatuarı) is a public conservatory affiliated with Istanbul University, specializing in music, theatre, and dance, located in Istanbul. It is recognized as the oldest conservatory and the oldest continuously operating music school in Turkey. The university provides music training from secondary school levels up to doctoral studies. Its main building, situated in Kadıköy, is a historical market hall, with the ground floor currently functioning as an active theatre venue.

== History ==
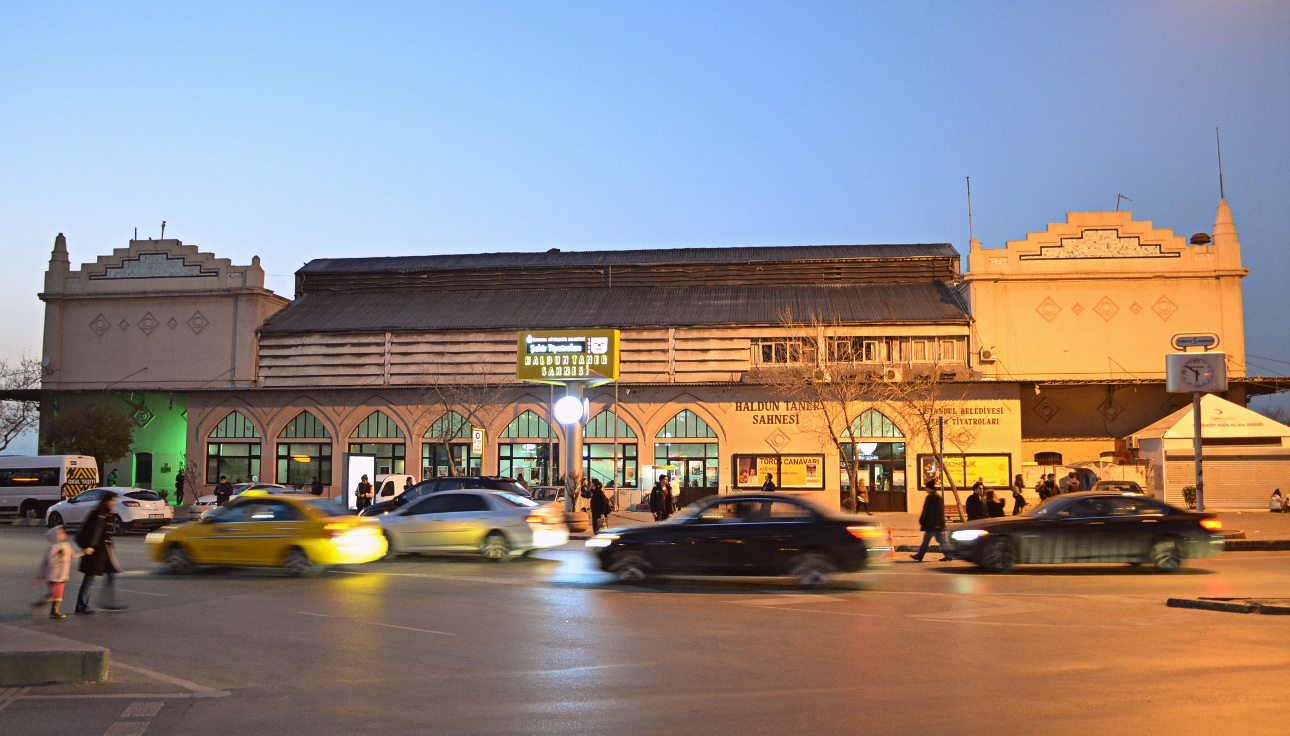
The Haldun Taner Hall, constructed by the Italian architect Umberto Ferrari circa 1927, is the main building of the conservatory.

The State Conservatory has its beginnings in its later sister institution, Darülbedayi (English: House of Beauty). In 1914, Cemil Topuzlu embarked on an enterprise to establish the imperial school of drama and music, and French actor André Antoine was invited to Istanbul for this purpose. In its initial structure, Darülbedayi would teach performing arts and stage music, as well as European and Turkish music in their respective departments. The institution thus founded, its premises was initially going to be the famous Letafet Apartmanı, a now demolished fin de siècle housing structure. However, with World War I breaking out before its inauguration ceremony, the institution would go on an indefinite hiatus and was shut down entirely by 1916.

Plans were made to revitalise the institution and establish a new and independent music school. They would materialise in New Year's Day 1917 as the Darülelhan (English: House of Melodies), a four-year academy that focused mainly on Turkish music.

Following the foundation of the Turkish Republic, Darülelhan would go on a period of restructuring, and would be renamed the Istanbul Conservatory, after the addition of a European-style music department. By the late 1920s, the school was teaching solfège, music theory, harmony, composition, instrumentation and orchestration, music history and instrumental training, among other skills.

In these early years, lectures were given in the wooden townhouse that served as the schoolhouse. Performances by the three-piece chamber orchestra started by Cemal Reşit Rey, a member of the later Turkish Five, would go on to be quite popular.

By the early 1950s, a performing arts department was established, and director Muhsin Ertuğrul began his career at the conservatory as a teacher.

In 1986, the conservatory became a school within Istanbul University.

== Notable alumni ==
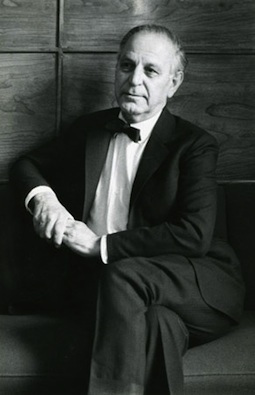
Ulvi Cemal Erkin, a member of the 'Turkish Five, became a faculty at the conservatory in 1923, at age 17.

Since its establishment in the late 19th century, the conservatory has produced a prestigious roster of graduates and faculty members, including all of the members of the Turkish Five: Ahmed Adnan Saygun, Cemal Reşit Rey, Ulvi Cemal Erkin, Hasan Ferit Alnar and Necil Kazım Akses. The legendary soprano Leyla Gencer also received her voice training at this conservatory. Among the notable alumni are Ahmet Rıfat Şungar, Ali Güven, Ali İl, Alican Yücesoy, Aslı Yılmaz, Atılgan Gümüş, Aysun Metiner, Ayşen Çetiner, Ari Barokas, Boran Kuzum, Bennu Yıldırımlar, Buket Bengisu, Can Başak, Can Doğan, Caner Özyurtlu, Cemal Toktaş, Cenk Tunalı, Derya Kurtuluş, Doğan Duru, Engin Gürkey, Ferhat Göçer, Feyzan Soykan, Fikret Kuşkan, Fora Baltacıgil, Göktuğ Alpaşar, Gülen Karaman, Şencan Güleryüz, Güneş Berberoğlu, Güneş Duru, İpek Erdem, Jülide Kural, Kemal Kocatürk, Kosta Kortidis, Levent Yüksel, Memet Ali Alabora, Mine Tugay, Nejat Birecik, Nihal Yalçın, Okan Yalabık, Oktay Kaynarca, Olgun Şimşek, Peker Açıkalın, Selim Erdoğan, Serkan Ercan, Sevda Karababa, Sevgi Sakarya, Taner Ertürkler, Taner Ölmez, Tufan Karabulut, Uzay Heparı, Uğur Polat, Yeşim Alıç, Yeşim Koçak, Yıldız Asyalı, Sanem Çelik, Öykü Karayel, Özden Ayyıldız, Özge Borak, Özgü Namal and Banu Kırbağ.
