= Necil Kazım Akses =

Turkish composer (1908–1999)

- Born: 6 May 1908; Istanbul, Turkey
- Died: 16 February 1999 (aged 90)
- Education: Musikakademie, Vienna; Prague Conservatory
- Occupations: Classical composer, cultural attaché

Necil Kazım Akses (6 May 1908 – 16 February 1999) was a Turkish classical composer.

== Life ==
Akses studied music and composition at the Musikakademie in Vienna with Joseph Marx and at the Prague Conservatory in Prague with Josef Suk and Alois Hába. He helped co-found the Ankara State Conservatory with the composer Paul Hindemith and served as director of the institution for a while.

Together with Cemal Reşit Rey, Ulvi Cemal Erkin, Ahmet Adnan Saygun, and Hasan Ferit Alnar, Akses belonged to a group called The Turkish Five, who were the first Turkish composers to adapt their homeland's musical tradition to the techniques of Western classical composition. (Their name alluded to the Russian Five.)

In 1949, Akses entered the service of the Turkish state. He worked as the Turkish cultural attaché in Bern and Bonn, among other posts.

Akses composed orchestral works, chamber music, and pieces for piano. His most famous work is his Violin Concerto (1969).

== Works ==
=== Operas ===
- Mete, opera in one act. Libretto: Yaşar Nabi Nayır (1933)
- Bay önder, opera in one act. Libretto: Münir Hayri Egeli (1934). (First performance: 27 December 1934-Ankara-Conductor: Adnan Saygun)
- Timur, opera in four acts. Libretto: Behçet Kemal Çağlar (incomplete) (1956)
- MİMAR SİNAN, opera. Libretto: Necdet Aydın and Necil Kâzım Akses (first act completed) (1980’s)

=== Orchestra ===
- Poem (1932–33) (premièred on 29 October 1933-Prague)
- A Summer Remembrance – Morning on the Bosphorus (1932–33) (premièred on 29 October 1933-Prague)
- "Çiftetelli" Op.6 (Symphonic Dance) (1933) (First performance1934-Prague)
- "Bayönder Suite" from the opera "Bayönder" (1934)
- "The Citadel of Ankara" – Symphonic Poem - (1938–1942) Ankara State Conservatory Publication (First performance: October 1942-Ankara-PSO*-E. Praetorius)
- "Ballade" (1947) (State Conservatory Publication No.55) (First performance: 14 April 1948-Ankara-PSO-Ferid Alnar)
- "Two Antique Dances" (orchestral version) (23 May 1962) (State Conservatory Publication No.40) (First performance: 25 November 1969-Ankara-PSO-Hikmet Şimşek)
- Symphony No. 1 (1966) (State Conservatory Publication) (First performance: 10 November 1967-Ankara-PSO-Gothod Ephraim Lessing)
- Scherzo on Itri’s Neva Kâr (1970) (First performance: 25 December 1970-Ankara-PSO-Hikmet Şimşek)
- " ‘Sesleniş’(Calling) for the 50th Anniversary of Turkish Republic" (1973) (First performance: 27 October 1973-Ankara-PSO-Hikmet Şimşek)
- Concerto for Orchestra (1976–1977) (First performance: 1 April 1977-Ankara-PSO-Otakar Trhlik)
- Symphony No. 2 (for strings orchestra) (1978) (Private Publication)(First Concert performance: 4 February 1997-Aşkabad-Türkmenistan-Orkestra "SAZ"-Muhammed Nazer Mommadov)
- Symphony No. 3 (1979–1980) (First performance: 2 May 1980-Ankara-PSO-Gürer Aykal)
- "War for Peace-To the memory of Atatürk" (Symphonic Poem) (1981 First performance: 26 March 1982-Ankara-PSO-Gürer Aykal)
- Symphony No. 4 "Sinfonia Romanesca Fantasia" (for solo cello and orchestra) (1982–1984) (First performance: 9 January 1987-Ankara-Ali DOĞAN-PSO-Rengim Gökmen)
- Symphony No. 5 "Thus spoke Atatürk" / "Sinfonia Rhetorica" (Rhetoric symphony for tenor solo, chorus, children’s chorus, organ and orchestra) (1988) (First performance: 26 October 1989-İstanbul-IDSO-Rengim Gökmen)
- Symphony No. 6 "Ölümsüz Kahramanlar" (Immortal Heroes) (For Bariton Solo, Chorus and Large Orchestra)(First Movement Completed) (1992)

=== Vocal music ===
- "Poetry and Music" (for bass-baritone and orchestra) (1935) (State Conservatory Publications No.49)
- Symphonic Epic "For the 50th Year of Our Republic" (for soprano solo, chorus and orchestra) (1973) (State Conservatory Publications)
- "Parade of Soloists" (from the opera "Timur") (for soprano, mezzo-soprano, baritone and orchestra) (1974)
- "Lyric Poem from A Divan" (for tenor solo and orchestra) (1976) (First performance: 24 December 1976-Ankara-Osman Gökoğlu- PSO - Gürer Aykal)

=== Solo instrument and orchestra ===
- "Poem" (for solo cello and orchestra) (1946) (State Conservatory Publication No.25) (First performance: 29 June 1946, Ankara, Antonio Saldarelli, PSO, Ferid Alnar)
- Violin Concerto (1969) (State Conservatory Publication) (First performance: 5 May 1972, Ankara, Suna Kan, PSO, Gothod Ephraim Lessing)
- Viola Concerto (1977) (First performance: 14 April 1978, Ankara, Koral Çalgan, PSO, Tadeusz Strugała)
- "Idyll" (for cello and orchestra) (1981) (First performance 20 March 1981, Ankara, Doğan Cangal, PSO, Gürer Aykal)

=== Chamber music ===
- "Allegro Feroce" (for clarinet/saxophone and piano) (1930) (Universal Edition Publication No. 10.024) (First performance: 5 May 1931-Vienna) (Friedrich Wildans-Friedrich Statzer)
- "Allegro Feroce" (viola and piano version)
- Introduction and Fugue for String Quartet (1930–31) (First performance: Vienna-5 May 1931-The Rothschild Quartet)
- "Poem" (for violin and piano) (1930) (First performance: 5 May 1931-Vienna-Christa Richter (violin)-Friedrich Statzer (piano)
- Sonata for flute and piano (1933) (Jorj D.Papajorjiu Publication No. 64. First performance: 13 June 1934 Prague-Karel Neoproud-Flute-Karel Reiner-Piano)
- "Three Poems" (for mezzo-soprano and string quartet) (1933)
- Trio for Strings (1945) (State Conservatory Publication No. 43)
- String Quartet No. 1 (1946) (State Conservatory Publication No.21) First performance: 26 September 1947-Prague-Çeskoslovenska Quartet)
- String Quartet No. 2 "Elegy" (1971) (First performance: 28 October 1974-İstanbul-Vienna Soloists)
- String Quartet No. 3 (1979) (First performance: 1979-TRT studio recording- Yücelen Quartet)
- String Quartet No. 4 (1990) (First performance: 23 October 1991 – Düsseldorf-Yücelen String Quartet)

=== Voice and piano ===
- "Portraits I" (for voice and piano) (1964) (State Conservatory Publication No.30)
- "Music for Poems"/Portraits II (for voice and piano) (1975) State Conservatory Publication No:75
- No or yes? (Lied) (for voice and piano) (1988)

=== Piano music ===
- Preludes and Fugues (for piano) (1929)
- Turkish Invention (for piano)
- Five Piano Pieces (1930) Universal Edition UN 9625 publication)
- Piano Sonata (1930) (Jorj D.Papajorjiu Publication No.73 (First performance: 5 May 1931-Vienna: Friedrich Statzer)
- "Miniatures" (for piano) (Jorj D.Papajorjiu Publication No.80) (1936)
- Two Antique Dances (piano version)
- Ten piano pieces (1964) (Ankara State Conservatory Publication No.29)

=== Solo instrument ===
- "Capriccio" (for solo viola) (May 1978) (First performance: 30 April 1979-Ankara-Koral Çalgan)
- "Sad Melody" (for solo viola) (23 April 1984)

=== Chorus ===
- Folk Songs (Harmonized) (1936)
- A cappella chorus compositions (1947) (State Conservatory Publication No.23)
- Ten Folk Songs(Harmonized a capella mixed chorus) (1964) (State Conservatory Publication No.33) (First performance of some of them -1964-Ankara State Opera Chorus-Ferit TÜZÜN)
- "Poets Devoted to İstanbul" (for polyphonic a cappella chorus) (1983) (First performance: the same year, TRT Ankara Polyphonic Chorus-Walter Strauss-Studio recording)

=== Marches ===
- "Conservatory March" (with Ulvi Cemal Erkin) – (for chorus and orchestra) (1940)
- Boy Scout March (for chorus and orchestra)
- "Turkey"(march for chorus and orchestra)
- "March for the 50th Anniversary of the Republic" (for chorus and orchestra) (1973) (First performance: 1973-PSO-Hikmet Şimşek)

=== Incidental music ===
- Incidental music for "Julius Caesar" by Shakespeare (for wind instruments) (1942)
- Incidental music for "Antigone" by Sophocles (for wind instruments) (1942)
- Incidental music for "King Oedipus" by Sophocles (for wind instruments and women’s chorus) (April 1943)
