= Zeynep Gedizlioğlu =

Turkish composer

- Born: 4 December 1977 (age 48); İzmir
- Occupation: Composer
- Mother: Şahika Tekand
- Website: zeynepgedizlioglu.com

Zeynep Gedizlioğlu (born 4 December 1977) is a Turkish composer who won the Ernst von Siemens Composer Prize Award in 2012.

== Biography ==
Zeynep Gedizlioğlu was born 4 December 1977 in İzmir and grew up in Istanbul. She has spent most of her life in Istanbul and Berlin. Her mother is the actress Şahika Tekand and her father, Levent Gedizlioğlu, is an architect. Gedizlioğlu attended the Istanbul Conservatory. She went on to study in Saarbrücken, Strasbourg and Karlsruhe. Over the years she has learned composition from such people as Cengiz Tanç, İlhan Usmanbaş, Theo Brandmüller and Wolfgang Rihm. Gedizlioğlu has had her music appear and be performed by philharmonic orchestra all over Europe. She has a number of CDs released with her music. Gedizlioğlu has worked for IRCAM in Paris. She has won the Heidelberg Artist Prize as well as receiving several scholarships including one from the Baden-Württemberg Art Foundation in 2010.

== Works ==
- Kesik – Portrait CD Zeynep Gedizlioglu, col legno (2012)
- 'Stop' for the Orchestra – 'Begegnung mit Beethoven' – Beethovenfest and Deutsche Welle (2013)
