= Suna Kan =

Turkish violinist (1936–2023)

- Born: 21 October 1936; Adana, Turkey
- Died: 11 June 2023 (aged 86); Ankara, Turkey
- Occupations: Classical violinist; Academic teacher
- Years active: 1941–2017
- Organizations: Presidential Symphony Orchestra; Bilkent University

Suna Kan (21 October 1936 – 11 June 2023) was a Turkish violinist who studied in France and appeared internationally. She was a soloist and concert master of the Presidential Symphony Orchestra for 44 years. She was professor of violin at the Music and Performing Arts Department of Bilkent University in Ankara.

== Life and career ==
=== Early life and education ===
Kan was born in Adana on 21 October 1936. She began playing violin at the age of five. At age nine she gave her first public concerts with the Presidential Symphony Orchestra, performing Mozart's Violin Concerto in A major and Viotti's Violin Concerto in A minor. She continued her studies in Ankara with Walter Gerhard, Izzet Albayrak, and Lico Amar. In 1949 she was sent to France on scholarship, under a special law passed by the Turkish Grand National Assembly. She graduated from the Conservatoire de Paris in 1952, where she studied with Gabriel Bouillon. She won the Paganini Competition of Genova in 1954, second prize at the Viotti International Music Competition in 1955, the ARD International Music Competition in 1956, and the Prize of the City of Paris at the Marguerite Long–Jacques Thibaud Competition in 1957.

=== Career ===
Upon returning to Turkey in 1957, Kan became a soloist and concert master of the Presidential Symphony Orchestra, remaining in the position for 44 years. She gave concerts in Anatolia, first with the Turkish pianist Ferhunde Erkin and then regularly with Gülay Uğurata for 29 years. After Uğurata's death, she formed a duo with the pianist Cana Gürmen.

Her concert tours covered most parts of the world, including the UK, France, Germany, Belgium, the Netherlands, Sweden, Norway, Switzerland, Italy, Russia, Canada, the US, South America, China and Japan. She performed with international orchestras such as the London Symphony, the Los Angeles Philharmonic, Bamberg Symphony, Moscow Symphony and the Orchestre National de France (ORTF), with conductors such as Arthur Fiedler, Zubin Mehta Louis Frémaux, István Kertész, Gotthold Lessing, Michel Plasson, Hans Rosbaud, and Walter Susskind. She also collaborated with artists such as Yehudi Menuhin, Igor Bezrodny, Pierre Fournier, André Navarra, and Frederick Riddle.

In the 1970s, Kan founded the TRT Ankara Chamber Orchestra together with conductor Gürer Aykal and her husband Faruk Güvenç, playing as solo violinist and a member of the violin group. Beginning in 1986, in addition to her concerts, broadcasts and recording activities, she was professor of violin at the Music and Performing Arts Department of Bilkent University in Ankara.

Kan was a pioneer in interpreting the works of Turkish compositions for violin and orchestra by composers such as Necil Kazım Akses, Ahmed Adnan Saygun, and Ulvi Cemal Erkin. In 1971, she received the honorary title of State Artist from the Turkish government. She was also awarded "Chevalier dans l'ordre national du Mérite" by the Government of France. In 1996 she received the Sevda Cenap And Foundation Golden Medal, a prize offered to the distinctive performers and artists of classical music in Turkey.

=== Recordings ===
Kan made few recordings, in part because during her most productive years, recording business in Turkey was inactive; her recordings, some of them from live concerts, include Ulvi Cemal Erkin's Violin Concertos with the Munich Philharmonic, One of her most popular recordings was with pianist Corrado Galzio performing music by Brahms, Grieg, Debussy, Bartók, and Dvorak. She recorded Cemal Reşit Rey's Andante and Allegro for violin and string orchestra with the Northern Sinfonia of England conducted by Howard Griffiths.

With the Ankara Chamber Orchestra, conducted by Gürer Aykal, she recorded all violin concertos by Mozart, his Sinfonia Concertante for Violin, Viola and Orchestra and some duos with violist Ruşen Güneş. With the same orchestra, she recorded Bach's Violin Concerto in A minor, BWV 1041, Grieg's Serenade for Strings and Ulvi Cemal Erkin's Sinfonietta for string orchestra.

=== Personal life ===
Kan was married to the music critic Faruk Güvenç. Due to health issues, she retired from playing violin in 2017. She died on 11 June 2023, at age 86. One day later, she was buried at Karşıyaka Cemetery in Ankara.

== Legacy ==
The conservatoire of Ankara has held a violin competition in her name, with the second event in 2022.
