= Bay Önder =

- Opera by Necil Kazım Akses
- Librettist: Münir Hayri Egeli
- Language: Turkish
- Premiere: 27 December 1934

Bay Önder is a 1934 Turkish-language opera by Necil Kazım Akses. It was one of a group of operas commissioned by Atatürk as part of his cultural transformation.
