= The Luxurious Life =

The Luxurious Life (Turkish: Lüküs Hayat) is a 1933 Turkish operetta by composer Cemal Reşit Rey. The librettist was his brother, Ekrem Reşit Rey, and the story is based on criticism of the nouveau riche groups in the newly established Turkish Republic. The three-act operetta starts when a thief Rıza is accidentally thought to be a wealthy man (Rıza Bey) with the same name from Zonguldak at a ball. The story portrays the life of the new rich of 1930's Turkey and their indifference to the economic problems of the rest of the society.

It is one of the most successful and viewed Turkish operettas.
