= Emre Aracı =

Turkish music historian, conductor and composer

- Born: 22 December 1968 (age 57); Ankara, Turkey
- Occupations: Turkish music historian, composer and conductor

Emre Aracı (born 22 December 1968) is a Turkish music historian, conductor, and composer.

== Early life and education. ==
Aracı was born in Ankara, Turkey and moved to the United Kingdom in 1987.

He studied music at the University of Edinburgh, graduating in 1994 with a Bachelor of Music with honours followed by a PhD in 1999. The subject of his thesis was the life and works of Ahmet Adnan Saygun. During his years in Edinburgh, Aracı founded the Edinburgh University String Orchestra. In 2000, the orchestra established the Emre Aracı Composition Prize, which is annually awarded to student composers.

With funding from the Türk Ekonomi Bankası, between 1999 and 2002 Aracı was a research associate at the Skilliter Centre for Ottoman Studies, University of Cambridge, studying European music in the Ottoman Empire. In 1999, he founded a string orchestra called the London Academy of Ottoman Court Music which performed his orchestrations of compositions by Italian musicians resident at the Turkish court in the 19th century, as well as original works by Ottoman sultans in the popular dance forms of the period. The ensemble which was in existence between 1999 and 2003 and performed in London at venues including St James's Church, Piccadilly and St John's Smith Square. They held a concert in the Trinity College Chapel, Cambridge in 2000. Warner Classics released an album featuring a selection of these compositions recorded by the ensemble in 2002, under the title Invitation to the Seraglio. In Turkey, the same material was pre-released by Kalan Müzik on two CDs; European Music at the Ottoman Court and War and Peace: Crimea 1853-56.

== Research ==
His research focuses primarily on European musical practice in the Ottoman court. Based in the United Kingdom, he conducts research on Turco-European historical music under the patronage of the Çarmıklı family and Nurol Holding. Aracı wrote the first comprehensive biography of Giuseppe Donizetti which was published in Turkish in 2006. He also conducted a commemorative concert in Bergamo at the Teatro Donizetti on 4 December 2007.

Aracı is a public speaker on Turkish-European musical exchange, having lectured at venues including New York University, the British Museum, the Royal Academy of Arts, and the Universities of Cambridge, Oxford, Sarajevo and Vienna. He also acts as a cultural ambassador, with lecture tours organised by the Turkish Ministry of Foreign Affairs and hosted by various Turkish embassies, from Ottawa to Islamabad. He contributes to Turkish and English journals including Andante, The Court Historian, International Piano, The Musical Times and Cornucopia.

== Recordings ==
The album Bosphorus by Moonlight, which features his violin concerto bearing the same title, was recorded in the Rudolfinum by the Prague Symphony Orchestra with Turkish violinist Cihat Aşkın. The same album also includes miniature musical portraits of the Ottoman Imperial family by Callisto Guatelli, a director of the Istanbul palace orchestra.

Istanbul to London, Aracı's fourth album released by Kalan Müzik, was also recorded in the Rudolfinum with the Prague Symphony Orchestra and Philharmonic Choir and features two choral hymns, one by Angelo Mariani and the other by Luigi Arditi. Euro-Ottomania is the title of Brilliant Classics's global release, including the choral numbers as well as August Ritter von Adelburg's Aux Bords du Bosphore.

== Concerts ==
As well as taking part in the Izmir and Istanbul International Music Festivals, Aracı has also worked with various Turkish orchestras including the Presidential Symphony Orchestra, Istanbul State Symphony Orchestra, Antalya Opera and the Borusan and Istanbul Chamber Orchestras. He gave a performance with the Amsterdam Sinfonietta in the presence of Beatrix of the Netherlands in December 2006, as well as in May 2008 with Alexander Rudin's Musica Viva in Moscow. He has also performed in Latvia and Estonia, the latter being in Kadriorg Palace, as well as in Hagia Irene in Istanbul with the Naval Forces Band and the Istanbul State Symphony Orchestra on 20 October 2008.

== Works ==
Voice and Orchestra

- Farewell to Halûk [A setting of Tevfik Fikret's poem Halûk'un Vedaı], (baritone and orchestra), 1994

Orchestra

- Elegy for Erkel [for Osman Erkel], (strings and timpani), 1993
- Marche Funèbre et Triomphale, (strings and percussion), 1995
- Turkish Ambassador's Grand March, (Dedicated to Özdem Sanberk) (strings), 1998
- In Search of Lost Time, for the Golden Jubilee of Elizabeth II (large orchestra), 2002

Solo Instrument and Orchestra

- Bosphorus by Moonlight Violin Concerto [Inspired by Abdülhak Şinasi Hisar's novel] (strings), 1997

Voice and Piano

- In Memoriam Lord Leighton (soprano), 2002
- Idyllic Prague [Inspired by Siegfried Sassoon's poem Idyll], (baritone), 2003

Solo Piano

- Prelude alla Turca, 2004

== Recordings ==
- European Music at the Ottoman Court (Kalan Müzik, CD 177)
- War and Peace: Crimea 1853-56 (Kalan, CD 257)
- Bosphorus by Moonlight (Kalan, CD 303)
- Istanbul to London (Kalan, CD 349)
- Invitation to the Seraglio (Warner Classics, 2564-61472-2)
- Euro-Ottomania (Brilliant Classics, 93613)

== Books ==
- Adnan Saygun – Doğu Batı Arası Müzik Köprüsü (Yapı Kredi Yayınları, 2001)
- Donizetti Paşa – Osmanlı Sarayının İtalyan Maestrosu (YKY, 2006)
- Naum Tiyatrosu – 19. Yüzyıl İstanbulu'nun İtalyan Operası (YKY, 2010)
- Kayıp Seslerin İzinde (YKY, 2011)

== Selected articles ==
- "Reforming Zeal". (1997). The Musical Times, 138(1855): 12–15. https://doi.org/10.2307/1003539.
- "Her Excellency the Wife of Omer Pasha". (2000). Skylife.
- "Music to a Sultan's Ears". (2000/2001). Cornucopia, 4(22).
- "Giuseppe Donizetti Pasha and the Polyphonic Court Music of the Ottoman Empire". (2002). The Court Historian, 7(2): 135–143. https://doi.org/10.1179/cou.2002.7.2.004.
- "A Levantine life: Giuseppe Donizetti at the Ottoman court". (2002). The Musical Times.
- "Food, music, Rossini and the Sultan". (2006). In Turkish Cookery, Saqi Books.

== General references ==
- "Emre Aracı, Sultan Abdülaziz'i Warner Classics sanatçısı yaptı". Hürriyet Kelebek (in Turkish). 2 May 2004.
- "Emre Aracı'dan 'Türk Kasidesi'". CNN TÜRK (in Turkish). 20 October 2005.
