= Turkish Five =

Five main pioneers of Western classical music in Turkey

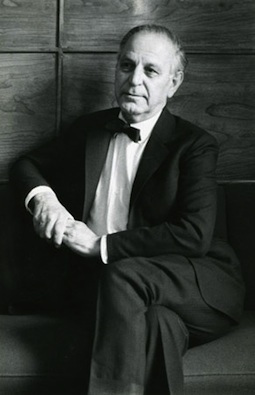
Ulvi Cemal Erkin

The Turkish Five (Turkish: Türk Beşleri) is a name used by some authors to identify five pioneers of Western classical music in Turkey. They were all born in the first decade of the 20th century, within about three-and-a-half years of each other, and composed their best music in the early years of the Republic of Turkey, especially during the presidencies of Mustafa Kemal Atatürk and İsmet İnönü. They all shared contacts with the two presidents and were highly encouraged as such, both on a personal level and also through the general drive towards westernization in Turkey.

The Turkish Five composers are:

- Ahmet Adnan Saygun (1907-1991)
- Ulvi Cemal Erkin (1906-1972)
- Cemal Reşit Rey (1904-1985)
- Hasan Ferit Alnar (1906-1978)
- Necil Kazım Akses (1908-1999)

These composers set out the direction of classic music in the newly established Turkish Republic. The use of Turkish folk music and traditional/modal elements in an entirely western symphonic style characterised the music of these composers.
