= Ulvi Cemal Erkin =

Turkish composer (1906 - 1972)

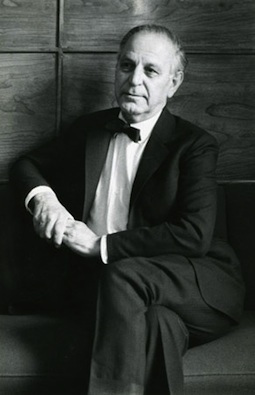
- Born: March 14, 1906; Istanbul, Ottoman Empire
- Died: September 15, 1972 (aged 66); Ankara, Turkey
- Occupation: Musician

Ulvi Cemal Erkin (Turkish pronunciation: [ulˈvi dʒeˈmal æɾˈkin]) (March 14, 1906 – September 15, 1972) was a member of the pioneer group of symphonic composers in Turkey, born in the period 1904–1910, who later came to be called The Turkish Five. These composers, all trained in Europe took on the responsibility of creating a new Turkish music style, both universal and also local at the same time. They utilized Western musical forms, i.e. symphony, concerto and opera, and brought in melodic, harmonic, modal and rhythmic elements of Turkish folk music, also known as Anatolian Village Music, and Ottoman Court music, popularly known as Turkish Art Music.

== Biography ==
Ulvi Cemal Erkin's aptitude for music was noticed at an early age by his mother, herself a pianist. His father was a senior civil servant in the Ottoman administration, who contracted sepsis and died when Ulvi Cemal was seven years old. Ulvi Cemal had two older brothers, Feridun Cemal and Adnan Cemal. The widowed mother and her three sons took refuge at the mansion of the maternal grandfather, also a high-ranking official of the declining Ottoman Empire and an intellectual.

Erkin took his first piano lessons from Mercenier, a Frenchman, and later from Adinolfi; then, a renowned professor of music in Istanbul. He graduated from Galatasaray High School. Concurrent with his studies at the Galatasaray High School dispensing education in the French language, he pursued his efforts in the path of becoming a musician and availed himself of every opportunity which could contribute to his aspirations.

The newly founded republic was aiming to expand modernisation and westernisation to every aspect of life, including music. Atatürk had long pondered a reformation also in this domain and was very keen on seeing it in progress. To this end, scholarships were being given to gifted young students in European academic institutions. Ulvi Cemal Erkin was 19 years old when he won the contest of the Ministry of Education and was awarded a scholarship to study music in Paris, together with two other students, Cezmi Rifki Erinc and Ekrem Zeki Un in 1925. He studied in the Paris Conservatory and the Ecole Normale de Musique. He studied piano with Isidor Philipp, and composition with Jean and Noël Gallon and Nadia Boulanger at the Paris Conservatoire and the École Normale de Musique.

Upon his return to Turkey in 1930, he began teaching at the Musiki Muallim Mektebi (School of Musical Education). He met his wife Ferhunde Erkin (née Remzi) there. On September 29, 1932, he married her, herself a pianist, graduate of the Leipzig Conservatory, and his colleague at the school in Ankara. She became his muse and best interpreter and they encouraged and trained young musicians with the scanty means afforded to institutions and to build up audiences of polyphonic music throughout Anatolia.

Erkin shared the grand prize of the Republican People's Party with Ahmet Adnan Saygun and Hasan Ferit Alnar in 1943 for his Piano Concerto. He wrote the famous Köçekçe orchestral suite the same year. It was Alfred Cortot who gave him the idea of composing a piano concerto during his visit to Turkey, after listening to his Quartet.

The Piano Concerto and the Köçekçe suite were premiered by the Presidential Symphony Orchestra on March 11, 1943. The orchestra was conducted by Dr. Ernst Praetorius, and Ferhunde Erkin was the soloist. On the request of German Ambassador Franz von Papen, the piano concerto was performed in Berlin, Germany, on October 8, 1943. The Berlin Philharmonic was conducted by Fritz Zaun and the soloist was again Ferhunde Erkin.

Erkin, who composed his first works while a student in Paris, was productive as a composer throughout his career as a professor of music which he embarked in 1930 at the age of 24, on occasion appearing as a pianist to perform a concerto, on others as an accompanist or as an orchestra conductor to interpret his own works or operas. He also conducted the Conservatoire Student Orchestra at its periodic concerts and composed the "Sinfonietta", a work composed expressly to help instrumentalists overcome certain rhythmic and modal difficulties, peculiar to Turkish music.

His works are widely and frequently performed and broadcast outside Turkey and he personally conducted his own works with orchestras such as the Czech Philharmonic, Concerts Colonne at the Brussels Fair and Orchestre philharmonique de Radio France.

Erkin's heart had been failing since his late forties and he succumbed to a last stroke on September 15, 1972, at the age of 66. He was laid to rest at the Karşıyaka Cemetery in Ankara.

== Honours ==
Erkin was awarded the Palm Académique, Légion d'honneur chivalrous and official degrees, and the Italian Republic Medal. He was conferred the title of State Artist by the Turkish government in 1971. Erkin was awarded a post-mortem medal of honour by the Sevda-Cenap And Music Foundation in 1991. A postage stamp commemorating his life was issued by the Turkish postal system in 1985.

In July 2010, The Municipality of Çankaya (Ankara) organised a national architectural competition for a concert hall with 2000 seats which shall be named after his name; Ulvi Cemal Erkin Concert Hall. The competition won by architects Ramazan Avcı, Seden Cinasal Avcı and Evren Başbuğ; a design team formed by the partners of SCRA Architects and Dist Architects. The site for the concert hall is in Çankaya, the central metropolitan district of the city of Ankara, the capital of Turkey.

== Works ==
=== Stage ===
- Keloğlan, ballet (1958)
- Karagöz, music for a children's play

=== Orchestral ===
- Two Dances for Orchestra (1930)
- Bayram, (1934)
- Köçekçe, dance rhapsody for orchestra (1943)
- Symphony No. 1 (1946)
- Symphony No. 2 (1948–1958)
- Sinfonietta, for string orchestra (1951–1959)
- Symphonic Movement (1968–1969)

=== Concertante ===
- Piano Concertino (1932)
- Piano Concerto (1942)
- Violin Concerto (1946–1947)
- Symphony Concertante for Piano and Orchestra (1965-1966)

=== Chamber ===
- Lullaby, Improvisation and Zeybek Air, for violin and piano (1929–1932)
- String Quartet (1935–1936)
- Piano Quintet (1946)

=== Piano ===
- Five Drops, 5 piano pieces (1931)
- Sensations, 11 piano pieces (1937)
- Piano Sonata (1946)
- Six Preludes for Piano (1965–1967)

=== Vocal/Choral ===
- Full Moon and Nightingale, for soprano and small orchestra (1932)
- Six Folk Songs, for voice and piano (1936), also arranged for voice and orchestra
- Twelve Folk Songs (1936)
- Seven Folk Songs, for voice and orchestra (1939), also arranged for voice and orchestra
- Six Folk Songs for Mixed Chorus (1945)
- Ten Folk Songs for Mixed Chorus (1963)

== See also ==
- The Turkish Five
- Feridun Cemal Erkin
