= Hasan Ferit Alnar =

Turkish composer (1906–1978)

- Early black and white image of Hasan Ferit Alnar
- Born: 11 March 1906; Istanbul, Ottoman Empire
- Died: July 30, 1978 (aged 72); Istanbul, Turkey
- Education: University of Music and Performing Arts Vienna
- Occupations: Composer, Conductor
- Years active: 1930–1955
- Known for: His compositions combine classical Turkish music and Western music techniques
- Spouse: Ayhan Aydan (1943–1952)

Hasan Ferid Alnar (11 March 1906 – 30 July 1978) was a Turkish classical music composer.

He was a member of the Turkish Five, in the first half of the 20th century. Alnar is known for his efforts for harmonization of classical Turkish music elements and the classical music techniques. His best-known works are the Concerto for Kanun and String Orchestra and the Cello Concerto.

From 1946 to 1952, he was the conductor of the Presidential Symphony Orchestra, and from 1955 to 1960, he was the general music director of the Ankara Opera House at the State Theaters. After retiring in 1961, Alnar lived in Vienna and managed concerts in Central European cities. In 1964, he returned to Ankara and taught harmony, form knowledge and orchestration at the Ankara State Conservatory until his death in 1978.

== Life ==
Alnar was born in 1906 in Sarachane, Istanbul. His father was general manager of PTT Hüseyin Bey and his mother was Saime Hanım. The first child of the family; his brother Orhan Alnar is six years younger than him.

== See also ==
- Music of Turkey
