= Cemal Reşit Rey =

Turkish composer, pianist, script writer and conductor (1904–1985)

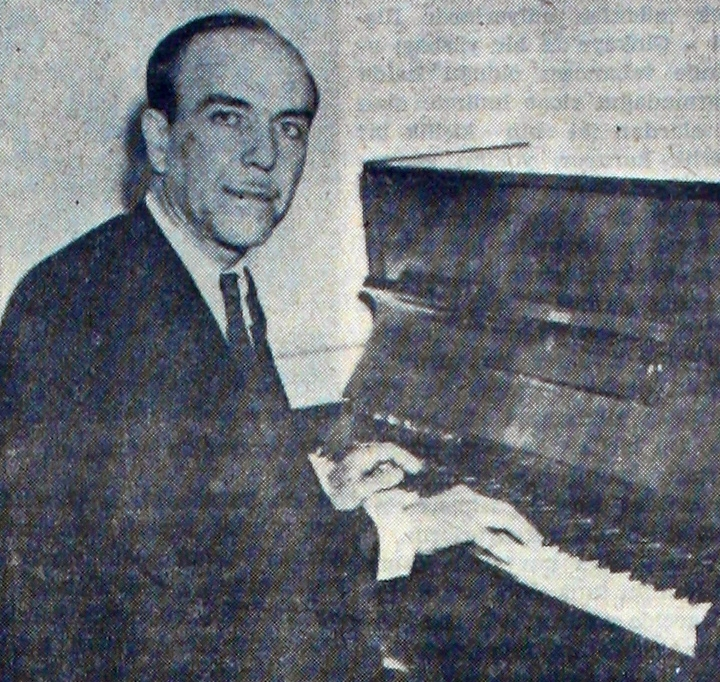
- Rey in 1950
- Born: 25 October 1904; Jerusalem, Ottoman Empire
- Died: 7 October 1985 (aged 80); Istanbul, Turkey
- Occupations: Composer, pianist, screenwriter, conductor

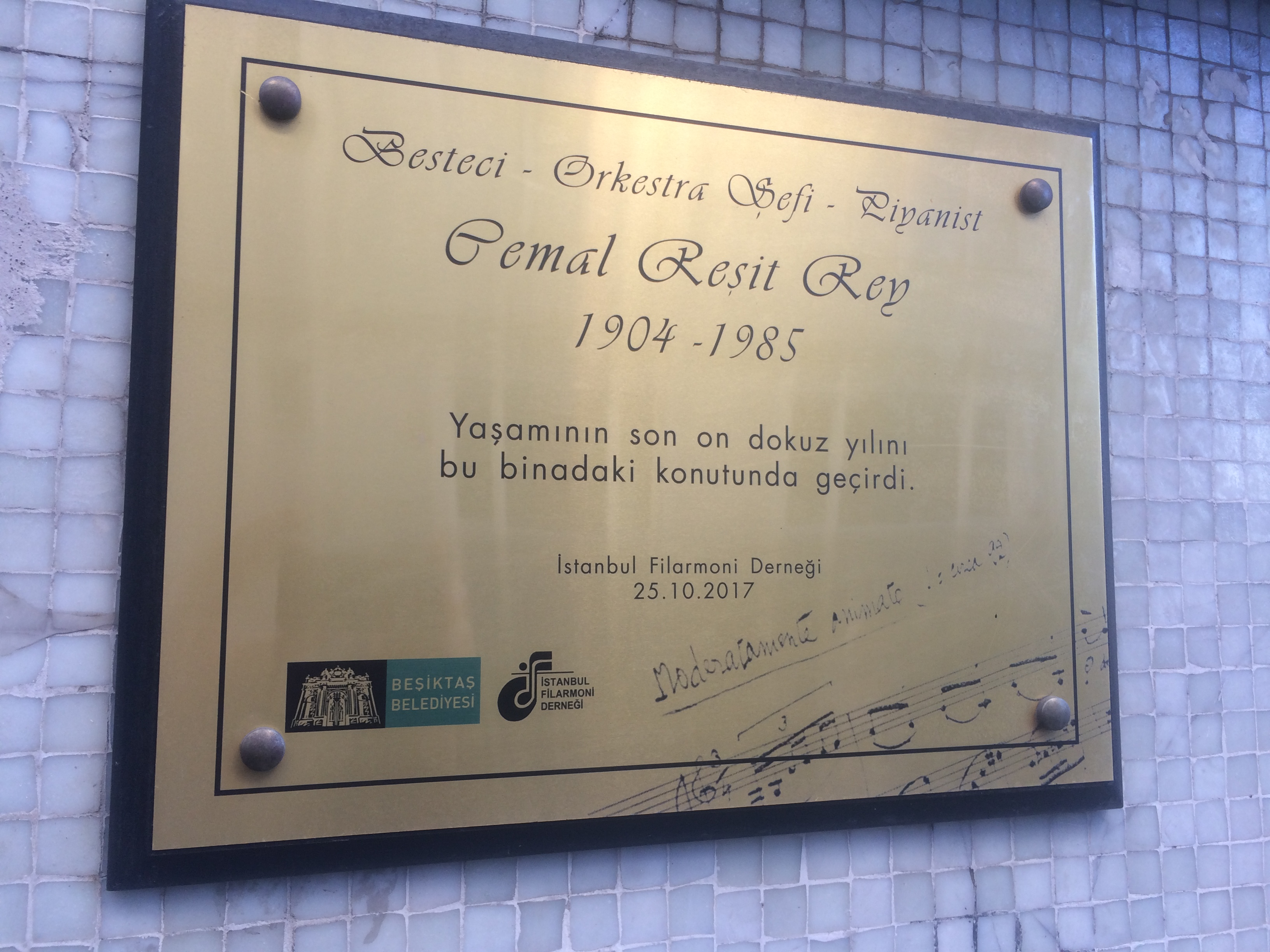
A plaque commemorating Cemal Reşit Rey at Yasemin Apartment Building, Serencebey Yokuşu 26, Beşiktaş, Istanbul, where the composer lived for the last 19 years of his life.

Cemal Reşit Rey (Turkish pronunciation: [dʒeˈmaɫ ɾeˈʃit ɾej]; 25 October 1904 – 7 October 1985) was a Turkish composer, pianist, script writer and conductor. He was well known for a string of successful and popular Turkish-language operettas for which his brother Ekrem Reşit Rey (1900–1959) wrote the librettos.

He was born on 25 October 1904 in Jerusalem and died on 7 October 1985 in Istanbul. He was one of the five pioneers of Western classical music in Turkey known as 'The Turkish Five' in the first half of the 20th century. Notable students include Yüksel Koptagel, a Turkish composer and pianist.

== Works ==
Operas

- La Geisha (adapted from Sydney Jones)
- Yann (Jann) Marek (1920) (Libretto by Xavier Fromentin)
- Faire sans dire (1920) (Libretto by Alfred de Musset)
- Sultan Cem (1922–23) (Libretto by Ekrem Reşit Rey)
- L'Enchantement (1924) (Libretto by Ekrem Reşit Rey)
- Zeybek("Zeibek") (1926) (Libretto by Ekrem Reşit Rey)
- Köyde Bir Facia (a Tragedy in the Village) (1929) (Libretto by Ekrem Reşit Rey)
- Çelebi (1942–73) (Libretto by Ekrem Reşit Rey)

Operettas

- Le Petit Chaperon rouge (1920)
- Üç Saat (Three Hours, 1932) (poems by Nazım Hikmet)
- Lüküs Hayat (The Luxurious Life, 1933) (Text by Ekrem Reşit Rey)
- Deli Dolu (Alive and Kicking, 1934)
- Saz Caz (1935) (Text by Ekrem Reşit Rey)
- Maskara (1936) (Text by Ekrem Reşit Rey)
- Hava Cıva (1937) (Text by Ekrem Reşit Rey)
- Yaygara 70 (1969–70) (Play by Erol Günaydın)
- Uy! Balon Dünya (1971) (Play by Erol Günaydın)
- Bir İstanbul Masalı (1972) (Play by Erol Günaydın)

Musical revues

- Adalar Revüsü (1934)
- Alabanda (1941)
- Aldırma (1942)

For theatre, film and radio

- Özyurt (prologue for soloist, chorus and orchestra)
- For Shakespeare's Macbeth
- For Shakespeare's Hamlet
- For Shakespeare's King Lear
- For Shakespeare's "Tempest"
- Lafonten Baba (children's play with music and dance)
- Bataklı Damın Kızı Aysel (film)
- Benli Hürmüz (Radio)

Orchestral works

- La Legende du Bebek (symphonic poem)
- Scènes turques
- Karagöz
- Paysages de soleil
- Instantanes (impressions for orchestra)
- Initiation (symphonic poem)
- Symphony No. 1
- L'Appel (symphonic poem)
- Fatih (Le Conquérant) (symphonic poem)
- Scherzi symphoniques
- Symphonic Concerto
- Symphony No. 2
- Türkiye (symphonic poem) (1971)
- Ellinci Yıla Giriş (symphonic poem commemorating the 50th Anniversary of the Turkish Republic)

Concertos and concertantes

- "Introduction et Dance" for cello and orchestra
- "Concerto Chromatique" for piano and orchestra
- Poème for Ondes Martenot (or flute) and strings
- Violin Concerto
- "Pieces Concertantes" for Violoncello and Orchestra (dedicated to Pierre Fournier)
- Variations on an Old Istanbul Folk Song (Katibim) for piano and orchestra (dedicated to Samson François)
- "Andante et Allegro" for violin solo and string orchestra (dedicated to Suna Kan)
- Guitar Concerto (dedicated to Alirio Díaz)
- Concerto for piano and orchestra

Voice and orchestra

- Chants d'Anatolie (four songs, 1926)
- Two Songs (1930)
- Two Anatolian Folk Songs (1930)
- Mystique (Tenor and Orchestra) (1938)
- Vocalise–Fantaisie (1975, dedicated to Suna Korad)
- Three Anatolian Folk Songs (1977)
- Arrangements of Schubert, Brahms, Scarlatti, Paisiello for voice and strings

Choral works

- Çayır İnce (four-voice a capella)
- Two Pieces on Poems by Yunus Emre
- Anatolian Folk Songs (1926)
- Ten Folk Songs (four-voice chorus and piano, 1963)
- Two Songs (a capella women's chorus, 1936)

Voice and piano

- Je me demande (1919)
- Three Melodies (1920)
- Initiales sur un banc (1921)
- Chanson du printemps (1922)
- Au jardin (1923)
- L'Offrande lyrique (eight melodies, 1923)
- Nocturne (1925)
- Twelve Anatolian Folk Songs (1926)
- Folk Songs (1928)
- Twelve Melodies (1929)
- Vatan (1930)
- Four Melodies (1956)
- Paris Sokakları("Le Pecheur de Pergame")(Streets of Paris, 1981)

Chamber Music

- Impressions of Anatolia for violin and piano
- Piece for woodwind quintet
- String Quartet
- Short Piece for violin and piano
- Piano Quartet
- Sextet (piano, voice and string quartet)
- Instrumental Dialogue (flute, harp, 2 horns and string quartet)

Solo Piano

- Waltz (1912)
- Sonata (1924)
- Sarı Zeybek (1926)
- Scènes turques (1928)
- Souvenirs d'automne (?)
- Sonatina (1928)
- Paysages de soleil (1930–31)
- Sonata (1936)
- Pélerinages dans la ville qui n'est plus que souvenir (1940–41)
- Fantaisie (1948)
- Two Pieces (1959)
- Ten Folk Songs (1967)
- Improvisation (1983)

Music for Two Pianos 12 Preludes and Fugues (1968)

Marches

- Himaye-i Etfalin (Children's Protection March)

(Tenth Anniversary March of the Republic, 1933)

- Navy March (1935)
- Yedeksubay Marşı (1940)
- Atatürk's 100th Birthday March (1981)

== Legacy ==
Cemal Reşit Rey Concert Hall in Istanbul is named after him.
