= List of people from Ankara =

This is a list of notable people from Ankara, Turkey.

== Musicians and music bands ==
- Mazhar Alanson
- Funda Arar
- İdil Biret
- Çilekeş
- Hande Dalkılıç
- Ayşedeniz Gökçin
- Nil Karaibrahimgil
- maNga
- Erkan Oğur
- Zerrin Özer
- Yağmur Sarıgül
- Fazıl Say
- Joe Strummer
- Özlem Tekin

== Others ==
- Ahmet Altan, journalist
- Mahmud A. Asrar, comic book artist
- Metin Arditi, French-speaking Swiss writer of Turkish Sephardi origin.
- Tekin Dereli, physicist
- Boran Kuzum, actor
- Filiz Akın, actress
- Ekrem Bora, actor
- Yıldıray Çınar, comic book artist
- Emin Çölaşan, journalist
- Burak Dakak, actor
- Yasemin Dalkılıç, free diver
- Vedat Dalokay, architect
- Ordal Demokan, physicist
- Cansu Dere, actress
- Can Dündar, journalist
- Enes Hocaoğulları, human rights activist
- Burak Sergen, actor
- Burhan Sönmez, novelist and president of PEN International
- Melih Gokcek, mayor
- Erdal İnönü, politician and physicist
- Orhan Karaveli, journalist and writer
- Vehbi Koç, pioneer industrialist
- Kartal Tibet, actor
- Tunc Ucyildiz, surfer
- Arda Güler, footballer
- Dilan Yeşilgöz, politician, born in Ankara
- Michael Linhart, Austrian diplomat and politician
- Chris McVoy, American architect
