= Minguzzi =

Minguzzi is an Italian surname. Notable people with the surname include:

- Andrea Minguzzi (born 1982), Italian Greco-Roman wrestler
- Anna Minguzzi (born c. 1973), Italian physicist
- Mattia Ahmet Minguzzi (2010–2025), child murdered in Istanbul
