= Bilkent Symphony Orchestra =

Turkish symphony orchestra based in Bilkent, Ankara

Bilkent Symphony Orchestra (BSO)
- Orchestra
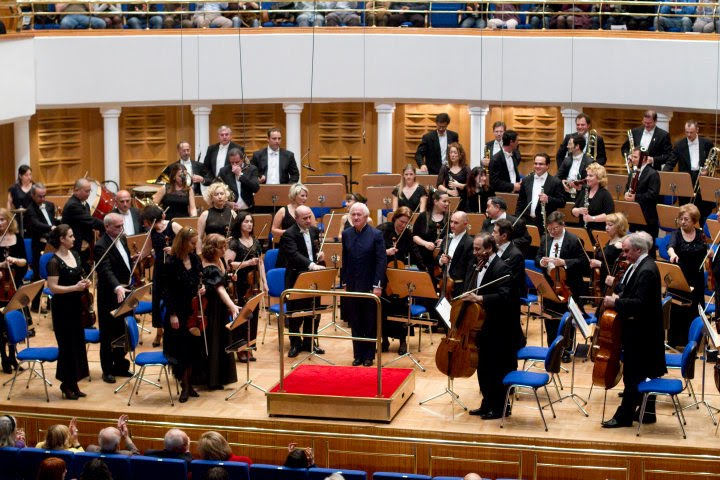
- The BSO with music director Klaus Weise
- Founded: 1993
- Location: Bilkent, Ankara
- Concert hall: Bilkent Concert Hall
- Principal conductor: -
- Website: www.bso.bilkent.edu.tr

The Bilkent Symphony Orchestra (Bilkent Senfoni Orkestrası in Turkish, also known as BSO) is a major symphony orchestra of Turkey located in Bilkent, Ankara. It was founded in 1993 by Bilkent University. Since 1994 the orchestra is based at the Bilkent Concert Hall. The BSO is UNICEF Turkey Goodwill Ambassador since 2009.

== History ==
The Bilkent Symphony Orchestra was founded in 1993 as an original artistic project of Bilkent University. Developed by the Faculty of Music and Performing Arts, the orchestra is composed of over 56 proficient artists and academicians of the Faculty from Turkey and 12 other countries. Turkish and foreign artists, continuing their postgraduate studies at the Institute of Music and Performing Arts also participate in concerts to further expand the orchestra. With these characteristics, the BSO is the first private, international and academic, artistic ensemble in Turkey.

=== Awards ===
Since its foundation, the orchestra has been awarded by several organizations such as Ankara Public Relations Association and Mevlana Foundation. Furthermore, UNICEF has recognized BSO as UNICEF Turkey Goodwill Ambassador upon its efforts to aid children in need in various regions of the world, specifically for the two CDs released, donating money earned to the earthquake victims of İzmit earthquake in 1999 together with several concerts given, donating money earned to Pakistan earthquake victims and Turkish National Committee for UNICEF campaigns such as Haydi Kızlar Okula. The BSO was also awarded as 'the best orchestra of Turkey' in 2011 by Andante Music Magazine.

=== BSO and Ahmet Adnan Saygun ===
Ahmet Adnan Saygun, one of the most prominent composers and musicologists of Turkey who is also known as the composer of the first Turkish opera, Özsoy had a close relationship with Prof. İhsan Doğramacı who is regarded as one of the most important philanthropists promoting music in Turkey and a leading figure for Turkish educational and health system as founder of two foremost universities of Turkey, Hacettepe and Bilkent Universities. Saygun had dedicated his two works to Doğramacı who pioneered the foundation of ethnomusicology departments at Turkish conservatoires for which Saygun had asked for many years. Upon this and the establishment of Bilkent University Faculty of Music and Performing Arts which was seen as a promising and encouraging music school by Saygun, he left his estate and works to Bilkent University. Thus, now the university preserves some of Saygun's personal belongings such as his piano and his writing table as well as the original forms of his manuscript notes at the Ahmed Adnan Saygun Music Research and Education Center, where Faculty of Music and Performing Arts students give recitals and chamber concerts year-round.

Following the foundation of BSO in 1993 which consists mainly of academics who teach at the Faculty of Music and Performing Arts, BSO has assumed responsibility to perform and record Saygun's works. BSO has recorded many works of Saygun such as Yunus Emre Oratorio, piano, viola, cello concertos and symphonies with soloists like Gülsin Onay, Hande Dalkılıç, Tim Hugh, Mirjam Tschoppand and Arturo Bonucci as well as under the baton of conductors like Howard Griffiths (conductor), Rodolfo Bonucci, Rengim Gökmen and Erol Erdinç. Furthermore, the orchestra's national label BMP (Bilkent Music Production) has supported some soloists to perform Saygun's works and made effort to release the albums which consists of Saygun's works in collaboration with several orchestras such as the Saint Petersburg Philharmonic Orchestra and the Istanbul State Symphony Orchestra.

Moreover, in collaboration with the Turkish Education Foundation (Turkish: Türk Eğitim Vakfı, commonly abbreviated as TEV), Ahmed Adnan Saygun Music Research and Education Center requested to compose an opera focusing on Saygun's life and vision due to his 100th birthday in 2007. The libretto was written by Şefik Kahramankaptan and the opera named Saygun Emre was composed by Yiğit Aydın who is also an academic at Bilkent University. The scene Vasiyet(Bequest) of Saygun Emre opera at which Saygun leaves his estate to Bilkent University and İhsan Doğramacı appeared as a character was performed at Bilkent Concert Hall by BSO in 2009.

== Performances and recordings ==
Starting as a Sinfonietta, the symphonic orchestra now has the identity of an ensemble of orchestras, comprising the Bilkent Chamber Orchestra an Ensemble of Wind Instruments and various other orchestral formations. With Turkish and foreign guest conductors, soloists and choirs, the ensemble of orchestras has distinguished itself through its season events of over 80 concerts per year and the television and radio broadcasts of these performances.

The national label Bilkent Music Production has released over 50 CD’s of the orchestras concerts. Amongst the orchestra's recordings are the Ahmet Adnan Saygun concertos with Gülsin Onay under the baton of Howard Griffiths; Kamran Ince symphonies and concertos with Kamran Ince as soloist as well for Naxos and CPO and the productions released in 2007 including Ahmet Adnan Saygun’s piano, violin, viola and violoncello concertos by CPO in collaboration with Peermusic and the Tabakov concertos by Naxos Records.

Through events such as the Bilkent Concert Series, Turkish Composers Week, Education Concerts and The Bilkent International Anatolia Music Festival, the orchestra aims to bring a wide range of activities to large audiences, to spread the appreciation of music at national level, undertake international activities and develop cooperation with institutions abroad. Along these objectives the orchestra has toured to Italy (1998), Germany (Schleswig-Holstein Musik Festival 2000,2011), Belgium (2001), Portugal (2000) Switzerland (2002-2004 Montreux Festival) and to Tokyo (2004)

Among the artists the orchestra has performed with are Valery Afanassiev, Pierre Amoyal, Alison Balsom, İdil Biret, Han-na Chang, Robert Cohen, Jean-Philippe Collard, José Cura, Nikolai Demidenko, Emre Elivar, Denyce Graves, Janine Jansen, Sumi Jo, Suna Kan, Olga Kern, Albert Dohmen, Lang Lang, Elisabeth Leonskaja, Mischa Maisky, Jacques Mercier, Shlomo Mintz, Christiane Oelze, Gülsin Onay, Güher-Süher Pekinel, Mikhail Pletnev, Viktoria Postnikova, Vadim Repin, Olivier Charlier, György Sándor, Fazıl Say, Hüseyin Sermet, Sayaka Shoji, Maurice Steger, Akiko Suwanai, François Weigel, Alexander Ghindin, Nicola Benedetti, Sabine Meyer, Boris Berezovsky, Simona Houda-Šaturová, Emmanuel Pahud, Sharon Isbin Turkish State Polyphonic, Rome Philharmonic, Bulgarian State Radio and Schleswig-Holstein Festival Choirs.

The BSO has performed under guest conductors such as, Vladimir Ashkenazy, Gürer Aykal, Serge Baudo, Jean-Claude Casadesus, Aleksandr Dmitriyev, Jean Fournet, Howard Griffiths, Peter Gülke, Ernest Martinez Izquierdo, Yoel Levi, Gennady Rozhdestvensky, Nello Santi, José Serebrier, Lior Shambadal, Maurice Steger, Vlodymir Sirenko, Karl Anton Rickenbacher and Emil Tabakov

== Directorship and venues ==
Continuing its 2010–11 concert season under the artistic direction of Işın Metin with music director Klaus Weise, the orchestra and its ensembles welcome audiences at the Bilkent Concert Hall (640) and Bilkent ODEON (4000) in Ankara, Bilkent Erzurum Laboratory High School concert hall (300) in Erzurum and Bilkent Erbil College concert hall (750) in Erbil, Iraq.
