= Dalkılıç =

Dalkılıç is a Turkish surname. Notable people with the surname include:

- Hande Dalkılıç (born 1974), Turkish concert pianist
- Murat Dalkılıç (born 1983), Turkish pop singer and composer
- Yasemin Dalkılıç (born 1979), Turkish female free diver
