= Irina Nikotina =

Irina Nikotina is an Uzbekistani violinist. She was born in Tashkent, then in the Uzbek Soviet Socialist Republic. Irina Nikotina showcased a talent for the violin from an early age and developed her skills as a violinist from this early age. When it came time for college and further education, Nikotina chose to pursue a career as a musician and as a teacher of music and orchestra. Nikotina was accepted into the Tashkent State Conservatory in Uzbekistan and chose to study music and continue her life as a violinist. She finished her undergraduate degree within the department of music in the conservatory and became a talented violinist.

After completing her studies in music at Tashkent Conservatory, Nikotina furthered her musical education at the Moscow Conservatory, working towards a doctorate in music studies. Working under the tutelage of violinist Igor Bezrodny, Nikotina completed her doctorate in musical studies in 1986.

Following the completion of her education, she became a concertmaster in the Tashkent State Symphony Orchestra. She also played many solo ventures as a solo violinist in Uzbekistan. Nikotina has won many awards for her efforts as a soloist, including a first place award in the 3rd Uzbek Violin Competition.

In 1993, she moved to Turkey where she continued her career as a solo violinist. She performed in many recitals, concerts, radio, and television broadcasts in Turkey. Currently, she is teaching at Bilkent University, in Turkey. She is also the assistant concertmaster of the prestigious Bilkent Symphony Orchestra of Turkey.
