= Murder of Mattia Ahmet Minguzzi =

2025 child murder in Turkey

Killing of Mattia Ahmet Minguzzi
- Funeral photo of Mattia Ahmet Minguzzi
- Date: January 24, 2025
- Location: Kadıköy, Istanbul
- Type: Murder by stabbing
- Motive: Unknown
- Suspects: 15-year-old Berkay Budak and 16-year-old Umutcan Baba
- Verdict: Berkay Budak and Umutcan Baba sentenced to 24 years in prison
- Convictions: Budak, Baba: Murder of a child

On 24 January 2025, Mattia Ahmet Minguzzi, a 14-year old Turkish Italian boy, was killed by a 15-year-old Burkay Budak in Kadıköy, a district on the Anatolian side of Istanbul, Turkey. The incident has received international press coverage and has sparked an intense public discussion over youth violence in the country.

== Background ==
Mattia Ahmet Minguzzi was born in Istanbul on 23 April 2010, the son of Italian chef Andrea Minguzzi, originally from Misano Adriatico, who worked for the French consulate in Istanbul, and Turkish cellist Yasemin Akincilar Minguzzi.

== Incident ==
On 24 January, Mattia was admitted to an intensive care unit after being attacked by youths in a bustling street market in Kadıköy. According to media reports, the event took place in two stages:

- Stabbing: Minguzzi was stabbed five times by the 15-year-old Berkay Budak.
- Further assault: After falling to the ground from the stab wounds, Mattia was kicked by the 16-year-old Umutcan Baba.

Mattia was declared brain dead the day after the attack and pronounced dead on 9 February. The attack was captured on video, which circulated among media outlets and social networks, intensifying public reaction.

== Aftermath and reactions ==
After the incident, the suspects, 15-year-old Berkay Budak and 16-year-old Umutcan Baba, were arrested and sent to prison. Speaking to a media outlet, Mattia's parents demanded the maximum penalty for those responsible. The victim's mother, Yasemin Minguzzi, emphasized her expectation of severe punishment, declaring, "A murderer is a murderer." Mattia's grave was vandalized in the weeks following his burial and his parents received death threats.

Following the incident, many discussions took place in the Turkish media about what a potential punishment might look like. The fact that the suspects are under 18 affects the severity of their potential sentences. Lawyer Serkan Günel explained to a news outlet that anyone under 18 is legally considered a child and that Turkish law mandates a sentence reduction without exception, leaving judges with no discretion in the matter. He stated that if a minor is between 15 and 18 years old, a life sentence would be reduced to a term ranging from 12 to 15 years in prison.

In late February 2025, DEM Party Istanbul MP Çiçek Otlu submitted a parliamentary inquiry request to the Grand National Assembly of Turkey. Otlu called for a comprehensive investigation into the issues faced by both children driven to crime and child victims, highlighting the need for effective solutions. In the rationale provided with her request, Otlu drew attention to the high rate of crimes committed by minors in Turkey, and explicitly mentioned the murder of Minguzzi. The same month, in a speech at the Grand National Assembly of Turkey, Felicity Party Deputy Chair Mustafa Kaya called for justice for Minguzzi. Kaya stated that he had visited Minguzzi's family to offer his condolences and relayed the family's request for a legal amendment to ensure that perpetrators of such crimes are not treated as minors under the law, and that the suspects receive the harshest possible punishment. Emphasizing the importance of preserving this incident in the public memory, Kaya also stressed the need for strong deterrent measures to prevent similar tragedies in the future.

In March 2025, during one of their concerts, Kaan Tangöze, the lead vocalist of Turkish music band Duman, indicated that Mattia had attended one of their previous concerts and expressed sorrow for his passing. Tangöze's announcement was posted on the group's social media accounts with a note saying, "I want to tell you something," along with the hashtag "justice for Mattia Ahmet Minguzzi."

In April 2025, Turkish football club Trabzonspor announced that one of the stands in their stadium would be named after Mattia Ahmet Minguzzi. The decision was made by the club's management as a symbolic gesture and was officially communicated through the club's channels.

Turkey's President Recep Tayyip Erdoğan and Minister of Justice Yılmaz Tunç paid the Minguzzi family a visit. Erdoğan wished mercy and wished patience to the family.

On 2 June 2025, during their concert at Tüpraş Stadium in Istanbul, the American rock band Guns N' Roses paid tribute to Mattia Ahmet Minguzzi. A devoted follower of the band, Minguzzi was expected to attend the concert had he been alive. The band dedicated their performance of Knockin' on Heaven's Door to him, displaying his photo in the background visuals as a symbolic gesture of offering him the best seat in the stadium. This homage was also shared on their official social media accounts, accompanied by the message "Rest in Peace."

On 21 October 2025, suspects Berkay Budak and Umutcan Baba were sentenced to 24 years in prison, the maximum sentence allowed for underage perpetrators.

== See also ==
- Juvenile delinquency
