= Burak Erdoğan =

Burak Erdoğan may refer to:

- Ahmet Burak Erdoğan (born 1979), Turkish businessman
- Mehmet Burak Erdoğan (born 1972), Turkish mathematician
