= Bilkent Erzurum =

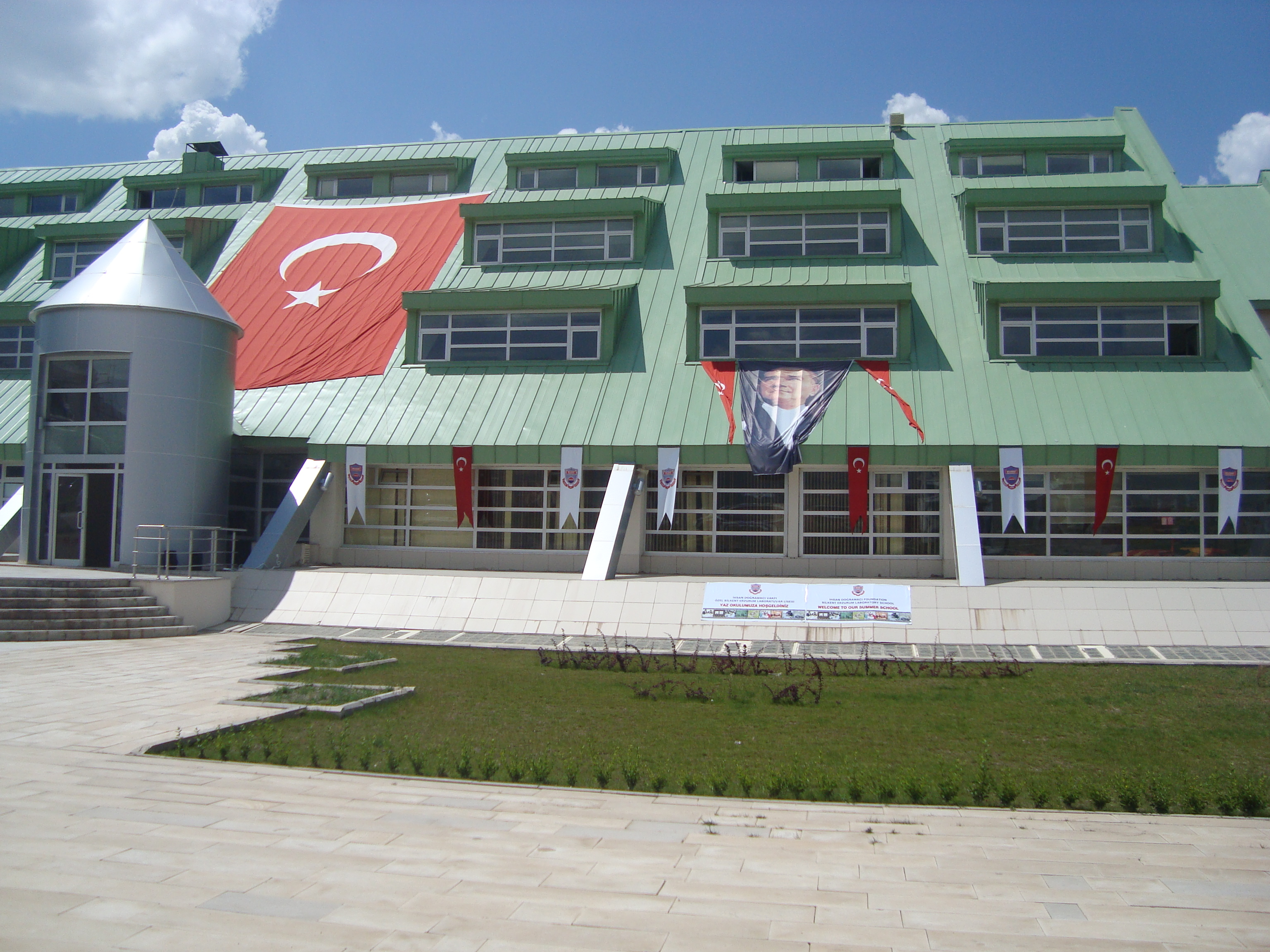
- Bilkent Erzurum

Location
- Palandöken, Erzurum; Turkey; 39.8859742°N 41.2258328°E

Information
- Type: Private boarding school
- Opened: 2007; 19 years ago
- Founder: İhsan Doğramacı
- General Director: James Swetz
- Grades: K12
- Gender: Co-educational
- Enrollment: 289 (High school)
- Campus: Urban
- Nickname: ÖBEL, OBEL, BELS
- Website: obel-eng.bilkent.edu.tr

İhsan Doğramacı Foundation Bilkent Erzurum Laboratory School (Turkish: İhsan Doğramacı Vakfı Erzurum Özel Bilkent Laboratuvar Okulları), commonly referred to as Bilkent Erzurum or BELS, is a private school under Bilkent University, located in Palandöken, Erzurum, Turkey. It was established by the Law 5526 in the Grand National Assembly of Turkey specifically to provide students with an international curriculum programme that includes the Ministry of National Education, International General Certificate of Secondary Education and International Baccalaureate curricula. The school opened in 2007 in the east of Turkey. Bilkent Erzurum is noted for its strong academic programs, having produced notable degrees in the IGCSE and IBDP international examinations.

== History ==
On 22 June 2006, the Grand National Assembly adopted Law No. 5526 which gave Bilkent University permission to open schools in the provinces of Erzurum, Malatya, Şanlıurfa and Van. The Bilkent Erzurum Laboratory High School led by Prof. İhsan Doğramacı and Prof. Ali Doğramacı was the first to be opened, with initial budget of 83,000,000 TL (~$50 million). The school provides international standards for advanced education which will continue to grow in next 10 years under the umbrella of the Prof. Ali Doğramacı Institute of Educational Sciences and İhsan Doğramacı Foundation. The Bilkent Erzurum Laboratory School aims to extend modern Turkish educational, teaching and learning practices throughout Turkey, to contribute to the development of the Turkish nation and help it take its rightful place in the contemporary world, and to be an exemplary institution in Turkey and in the world. The institution opened its doors to students on September 17, 2007.

=== School Administrative Board ===
- Prof. Ali Doğramacı, Honorary Chairman
- Prof. Abdullah Atalar, Chairman
- James Swetz, General Director of the School
- Prof. Kürşat Aydoğan, Vice Rector
- Prof. Mehmet Baray, Acting Dean

== Academics ==
=== Students ===
Bilkent Erzurum is founded as an exemplary educational institution not only for Turkey but also for the world.

— İhsan Doğramacı, during the opening remarks at the Bilkent Erzurum

Bilkent Erzurum aims to educate students in light of Atatürk's principles by encouraging the importance of national and cultural values, independent thought, self-assurance, scientific and creative thought, the school aims to foster students who, as individuals aware of the modern world, will be leaders for change in the future. The school will also function as a center for science and culture in the region. In accordance with the regulations of the Bilkent Erzurum High School, 8th Grade Primary School students who have graduated successfully from their schools will be considered for acceptance to the school through a two-phase examination period conducted in Erzurum, Ankara, and Istanbul. This is separate from the nationwide examination which every Turkish student must take in order to continue to high school after they complete their primary education. Bilkent Erzurum accepts 100 students every academic year. 70% of the students receive a "Full Tuition Scholarship" and 30% of the students receive a "Partial Tuition Scholarship", in accordance with how well the students performed in the exams evaluating their ability to think globally and critically in various subjects required by the international curricula of the IGCSE and IB. The Bilkent Erzurum unites students from all over Turkey, including the successful and skilled students who have limited educational facilities in the East of Turkey. Students of Bilkent Erzurum have several state of art facilities available to them. All students are provided with laptops to use in lessons when necessary. All books essential for the international and national curricula are provided.

=== Curricula ===
==== Turkish National education ====
The lessons required by the Ministry of Turkish National Education systems are studied in Erzurum Bilkent over the course of 5 years of education, which includes a prep year. In the prep classes English as a second language and other national courses are taught in order to prepare students for further studies in accordance with the MEB, IGCSE and IB curricula.

==== International education ====
According to the Law No. 5526, "in the laboratory schools when students complete 10th grade and move on to 11th grade, they need to pass international examinations which will be decided by the Bilkent University Senate. In order to graduate from these high schools, students have to have an International Baccalaureate Diploma". Bilkent Erzurum is now fully authorised by CIE and had an IB Authorisation Visit on February 8 and 9, 2010.

IGCSE Programme and Examinations

Fulfilling the law's requirements, the Bilkent University Senate decided that the IGCSE program from CIE should be applied in the Bilkent Erzurum School. Bilkent Erzurum was certified as an IGCSE centre in July 2008. The IGCSE programme hss been taught since the beginning of the 2008/2009 academic year. The validity and quality of CIE and the IGCSEs are recognized internationally and all courses and examinations are in English. The first examinations were held in May and June 2010. Currently studied subjects for the IGCSE examinations are First language Turkish, English as a Second Language, Biology, Chemistry, Physics and Mathematics.

International Baccalaureate Diploma Programme (IBDP)

Ihsan Dogramaci Vakfi Ozel Bilkent Erzurum Laboratuvar Lisesi has been an IB World School since March 2010. It offers the IB Diploma Programme. The school is, as of March 15, 2010 an IB World School, and is authorised to teach the IB Diploma Programme. Courses of this programme started in the 2010-2011 Academic Year with the first graduates in June 2012.

In its third era, beginning in 2022, Bilkent Erzurum has continued to emphasize the International Baccalaureate's educational approach and its international outlook. The school's International Baccalaureate programme provides a curriculum intended to prepare students for university and further education while developing skills associated with international perspectives.

CAS, TOK & EE

Creativity-Action-Service, Theory of Knowledge and Extended Essay lessons are the central core requirements of the IB hexagon.

- The extended essay is an independent, self-directed piece of research, culminating in a 4,000-word paper.
- The theory of knowledge (TOK) requirement is central to the educational philosophy of the Diploma Programme.
- The CAS requirement is a fundamental part of the programme and takes seriously the importance of life outside the world of scholarship, providing a refreshing counterbalance to academic studies.

In Bilkent Erzurum, in addition to the weekly curricular lessons 1 CAS, 1 EE and 2 TOK lessons are included on a weekly basis. Since these are mandatory lessons for IBDP, Bilkent Erzurum attaches importance to core topics.

=== Departments ===
Turkish

- Text Analysis
- Turkish Literature
- Language and Expression
- International Baccalaureate
  - High Level Turkish A1
  - Standard Level Turkish A1

Foreign Languages

- English Main Course
- German
- Integrated Skills
- Academic Reading & Writing
- Social Studies
- English Literature
- IGCSE Main Course
- English and American Literature
- IBDP English A2
  - Standard Level English A2
  - High Level English A2

Science

- Introductory Science
- IGCSE
  - Physics
  - Chemistry
  - Biology
- Social Sciences
- IB
  - High Level Physics and Standard Level Physics
  - High Level Chemistry and Standard Level Chemistry
  - High Level Biology and Standard Level Biology

Mathematics

- IGCSE Additional Mathematics
- IGCSE Extended Mathematics
- Mathematics Applications (Geometry)
- IB Mathematics
  - High Level Mathematics
  - Standard Level Mathematics

Social Sciences

- History
- Geography
- Religion and Ethics
- IBDP High Level Economy
- IBDP Turkish Social Studies

Physical Education

=== Summer School ===
Bilkent Erzurum's summer school is a continuation and a part of regular school year education.

Bilkent Erzurum Laboratory High School has summer school programmes for its students prior to and following the prep year programme. The summer school aims to enable the students to improve their English and to develop academic and social skills. The summer school programme is a compulsory part of the school year.

The summer school programme takes place in the Bilkent Erzurum Campus of Bilkent University with the expertise of native and non-native teachers who work at Bilkent Erzurum Laboratory High School or other schools of Bilkent University. In the programme prior to the prep year, there are courses of intensive English at the elementary level and music lessons, which are important parts of the Bilkent culture. Besides English and music lessons, there are lessons in various other fields. Cultural and sports activities, which take place during the weekends, and seminars on social and individual development, which take place on weekdays, enable students to develop outside of regular school hours.

The programme following the prep year aims to prepare students for the IGCSE programme, which they will follow during 9th and 10th grades. For the 11th and 12th grades, the summer school programme aims to prepare students for the IBDP and Turkish National student selection and placement examination.

== Extracurricular activities ==
=== Student Council ===
The Student Council is made up of a group of annually elected student governors. There are class representatives chosen from each class. The Student Council President is elected by all students through closed voting. Each year these elections are held again for each member of the Student Council. The Student Council is responsible for facilitating communication between students and the administration, as well as organizing social activities including assemblies, picnics, theatres and trips.

=== Publications ===
BilkentER: Bilkenter is a monthly broadcast English newspaper by the volunteer students in Bilkent Erzurum. Affiliated with the Bilkent News, this newspaper covers current issues. The main subjects are recent overall improvements in Bilkent Erzurum; successful students, competitions, conferences, club activities, reflections of the students, new technology, puzzles, art, faces on campus, travel notes and cartoons. These subjects vary with the creativity of Bilkent Erzurum students. Any student can contribute to the newspaper if they have an idea to share. Bilkenter is a student-led publication under the control of student editors.

Blink: Blink is the English literature magazine. Like Bilkenter, Blink is published by willing students. Poems, articles, book analyses, writer biographies, book introductions, movies or theatre, short stories, photographs and cumulative writings and pictures are covered in Blink. It is published monthly.

Üç Nokta: Üç Nokta is a tabloid newspaper written in three languages: Turkish, English and German. Students are free to contribute anything to the tabloid, from puzzles to poems and any subject in these languages. Üç Nokta is a monthly publication too.

Infinity: Infinity is a monthly science magazine mostly about mathematic and scientific improvements.

Ekin: Ekin is the Turkish Literature magazine that is published once every 2 months.

İZ: İZ is the history magazine published every term.

All of these publications are checked by the relevant departments for a gradual improvement.

=== Musical activities ===
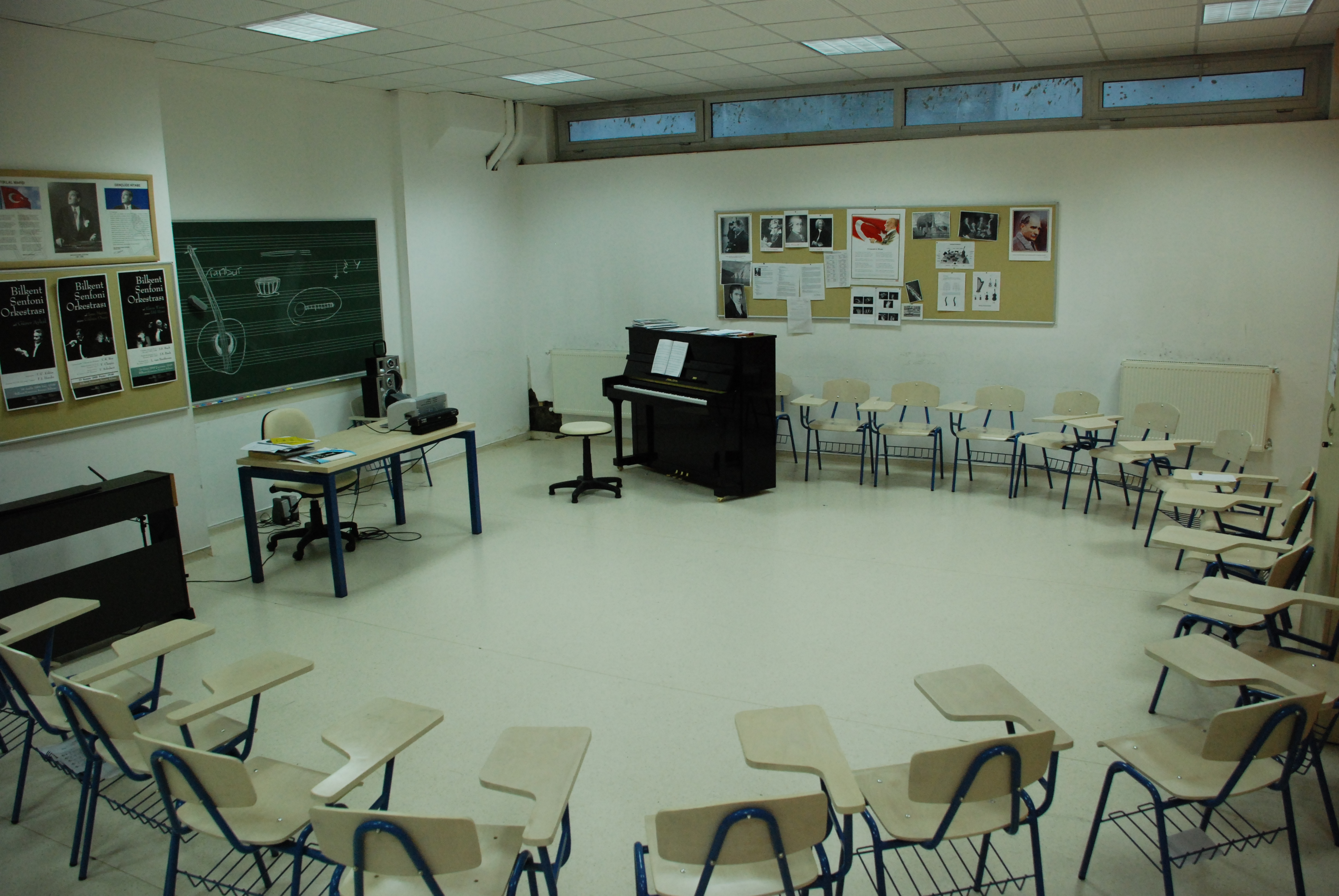
Music class in Bilkent Erzurum

School band

The Bilkent Erzurum School Band is an activity of the music club. The Band was founded in 2008. The Turkish National Anthem, Youth Anthem, Jazz and Blues based songs, traditional song, and some popular songs are generally included in the repertoire of the Bilkent Erzurum School Band. The Band was led by Conductor Janusz Szprot for 3 years. The band members are all from Bilkent Erzurum. Flutes, clarinets, saxophones, trumpets and trombones, bass, electric guitar and percussions are the main instruments played in the band.

BSO concerts

Bilkent University's official orchestra, the Bilkent Symphony Orchestra, performs concerts every month in the Bilkent Erzurum Concert Hall, which opened on December 14, 2007. These concerts are recorded and sometimes broadcast on television, especially on TRT 2 Erzurum Köşesi, Bilkent Erzurum's official television programme. BSO concerts are one of the Bilkent Erzurum students' and teachers' favorite activities as an audience. Bilkent Erzurum has hosted well-known artists and conductors including İdil Biret, Gülsin Onay, Işın Metin, Klaus Weise, Tamara Stefanovich, Gürer Aykal, Mischa Maisky, Jose Serebrier, Sayaka Shoji, Toğrul Ganioğlu, Hayreddin Hoca, Emre Elivar, Ayşegül Sarıca and Anu Tali.

=== Science fairs ===
The science fair is an annual tradition of Bilkent Erzurum. Every year students prepare projects according to their interests and they present their projects to other students, parents, and visitors. Science Fairs are not only focused on scientific projects but also focus on enjoyable activities such as, films, documentaries, competitions, theatres and dramas too. Science Fairs are held in the last week of may or in the first week of June.

=== Prof. İhsan Doğramacı April 23rd Basketball Tournament ===
The Prof. İhsan Doğramacı April 23 Basketball Tournament for Primary Schools is an annual tournament that starts in the first week of April.

The tournament aims to develop unity, brotherhood, and a spirit of sharing among students and to contribute to the physical, social and emotional development of children for the activities held on the April 23rd National Sovereignty and Children's Day.

=== Clubs ===
- Destination Imagination (DI)
- Music
- Chess
- Dance
- Visual Arts and Design
- Turkish Drama
- Model United Nations (MUN)
- German Language and Literature

Listed clubs are available in the 2010-2011 education year. In Bilkent Erzurum clubs are arranged according to the interests of students. Here is the list of some additional clubs active in past terms and years:

- Mathematics and Mind Games
- TÜBİTAK Science
- English Debate
- History
- Model Entrepreneurship and Investment (MEI)
- Habitat for Humanity
- Speed Reading
- Photography
- Physical Education

== Conferences and seminars ==
Bilkent Erzurum works collaboratively with Bilkent University, arranging for professors to visit Bilkent Erzurum to give conferences. The school also has the necessary infrastructure for video conferences. Music appreciation classes were taught via video conference in Bilkent Erzurum and students had the opportunity to talk with university professors abroad and from Bilkent University. Bilkent Erzurum has hosted well-known scholars.

== Trips abroad ==
New York

Bilkent Erzurum has organized student trips to New York City. The purpose of these visits was to meet with Bilkent University alumni and to experience a new culture in another country. These trips will continue with new groups of students in the coming years. In addition to New York City, Bilkent Erzurum students will also visit other states in the U.S. and countries in Europe in the future.

Germany

A group of Bilkent Erzurum students travelled to Germany with Bilkent Laboratory & International School (BLIS) and İhsan Doğracı Foundation Bilkent High School students. This trip strengtheneds the Bilkent family bond. Students had the chance to travel around Germany and see the premiere of Pelléas et Mélisande.

== TRT 2 Erzurum Corner ==
The Erzurum Corner programme series, which is broadcast on TRT 2, focuses on the analysis of research topics and the selection of works in art and science.

In the polyphonic classical music concerts, performed with piano from time to time, the musical characteristics of the works are explained with a level of language that can be understood by everybody.

In all of these programmes, the Bilkent Erzurum students ask questions and their questions are answered by the experts in science and art.

== Campus and facilities ==
Bilkent Erzurum campus has been built to withstand the climate of Erzurum in the East Anotolian Region and the classrooms and laboratories are fully equipped with state-of-the-art technology.

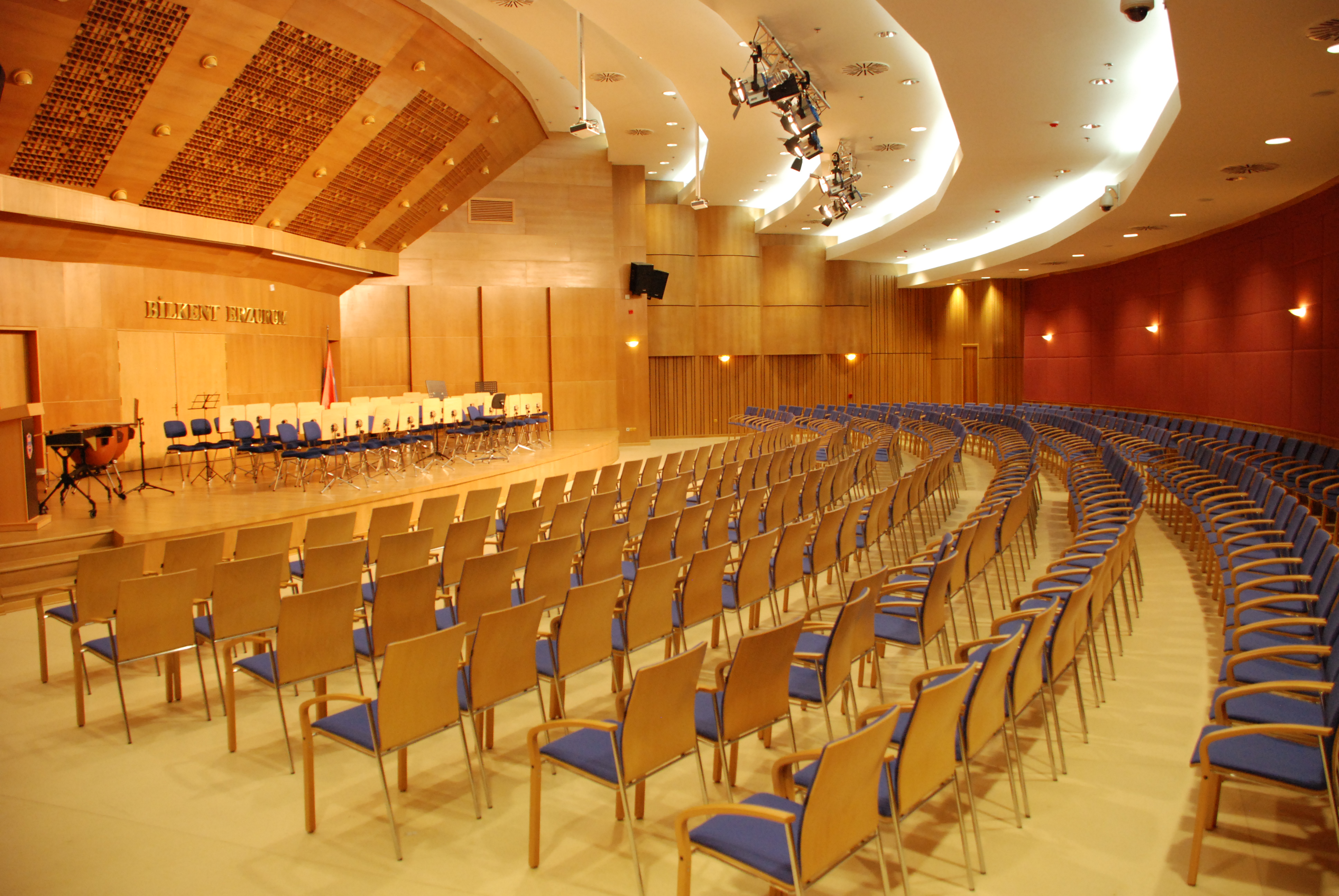
Multipurpose Hall

- 2-Storey Indoor Sport Centers
- Library
- Concert Hall
- Art & Culture Center
- Science Center
- Equipped Classrooms and Laboratories
- Outdoor Sports Grounds
- Faculty Housing

Multi-Purpose Hall

The various activities at the school such as ceremonies, celebrations, demonstrations, conferences, workshops, seminars, presentations etc. and the monthly concerts of the Bilkent Symphony Orchestra, performed by world-famous conductors and musicians, take place in the multi-purpose hall.

Sports Hall

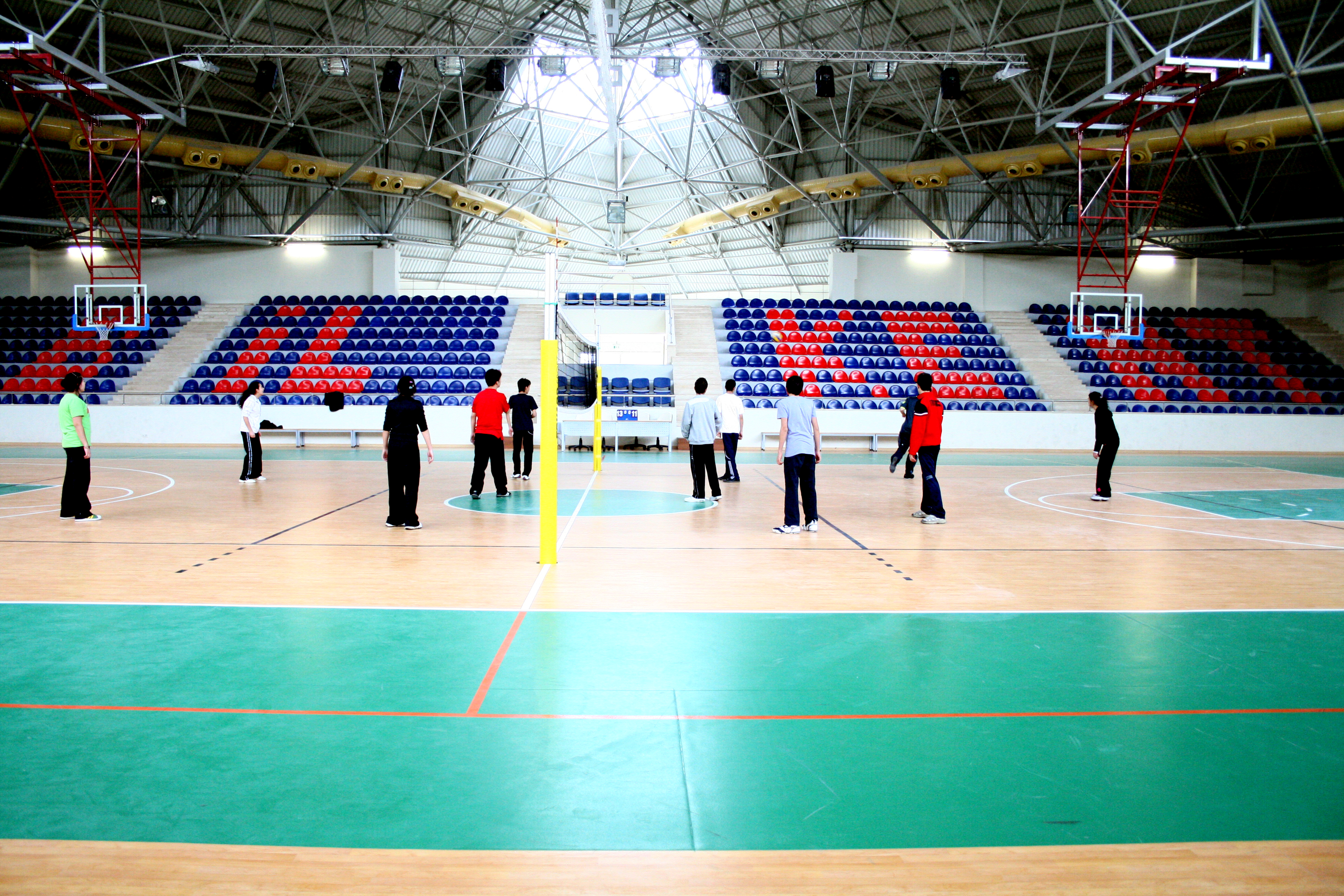
Bilkent Erzurum Sports Hall

The sports centre, whose construction was completed towards the end of 2008, is one of the biggest and most modern high school gyms in Turkey with its outstanding architecture and its 6400m² closed area. It is a two-storey building with upper floor facilities situated in a 28 m^{2} area that allows the school community to play many sports. The grandstand on the first floor has a capacity of 750 people. On the first floor, there are fitness machines and facilities for wrestling, boxing, martial arts etc. There are, in addition, 2 squash courts on the first floor. The baskets on the second floor fold and meet FIBA standards. The area on the second floor can be divided into two with an automatic curtain, which allows two groups or classes to use the hall simultaneously.

Library

Bilkent Erzurum Library is the biggest library among all high schools in Turkey and is one of the biggest libraries around Erzurum. The Library is very significant for the students. The library collection provides every kind of resource including works on Art and Music, Philosophy and Psychology, Religion and Ethics and also many general interest areas such as tourism and careers.

== See also ==
- Bilkent University
- Bilkent Laboratory and International School
- İhsan Doğramacı
- Education in Turkey
- List of concert halls

== Notes ==
- Financial Times article
- Bilkent University photo gallery
- Financial Times – Bilkent University (PDF)
- Bilkent News – Issue 15/12
- Bilkent News – Issue 15/22
- Bilkent high school students return from New York
- Erzurum Gazetesi report
- Erzurum Bilkent University project
- Bilkent University press release
- Bilkent Alumni page
- Bilkent Alumni page
- Bilkent Alumni page

TV Programmes

- Bilkent University TV Programmes
- Bilkent Video – TV Series

Conferences in English in Bilkent Erzurum

- Bilkent Erzurum English Conferences
