= Bilkent Laboratory and International School =

Location
- Ankara; Turkey; 39.8675°N 32.7646°E

Information
- Type: Private
- Motto: All hands together.
- Established: 1993; 33 years ago
- Founder: İhsan Doğramacı
- Faculty: 160
- Enrollment: 1000
- Campus: 5000 m^{2}
- Mascot: Bulldogs
- Accreditation: New England Association of Schools and Colleges (NEASC); Council of International Schools (CIS)
- Website: blisankara.org

Bilkent Laboratory and International School (BLIS), formerly Bilkent University Preparatory School (BUPS), in Ankara, Turkey, is a private K-12 school that currently educates approximately 1000 students aged 4 to 19. The school is on the south edge of Bilkent University's East Campus.

== Program ==
The school offers the IB Primary Years Programme (PYP) to students in prekindergarten through grade 4, International General Certificate of Secondary Education (IGCSE) to students in grades 9 and 10, and the IB Diploma Programme (IBDP) to students in grades 11 and 12. The school is recognized by the Turkish Ministry of Education.

== History ==
Bilkent Laboratory and International School was founded as Bilkent University Preparatory School in 1993. In 1997, Bilkent International School was added as an additional division of the school to accommodate international students. In 2009, the establishment of Bilkent Laboratory School was approved by an act of the Turkish Parliament. The school, in compliance with its bylaws, has a formal working relationship with the Bilkent University Graduate School of Education.

== Activities ==
The school has a formal competitive athletics program, as well as other extracurricular activities for students of all ages.

== See also ==
- Bilkent University
- Bilkent Erzurum
- İhsan Doğramacı
