= Hatice Ozer Balli =

Turkish New Zealand economics professor

- Spouse: Faruk Balli

Academic background
- Education: University of Houston
- Theses: The distributional properties and weak efficiency in Istanbul stock exchange: A sectoral analysis. (2001); Three essays on estimation of economic models (2008)
- Doctoral advisor: David H. Papell, Christian Murray

Academic work
- Institutions: Massey University
- Doctoral students: Jamshid Karimov, Abraham Agyemang, Mudassar Hasan, Andryan Setyadharma
- Website: haticeozerballi.weebly.com

Hatice Ozer Balli is a Turkish–New Zealand academic, and is Professor of Applied Econometrics at Massey University, specialising in international economics, macrofinance, and applied time series econometrics.

== Academic career ==
Ozer Balli completed her undergraduate degree in Middle East Technical University and a master's degree at Bilkent University in Turkey, before moving to the US for her doctoral studies. She completed a PhD in Economics titled Three essays on estimation of economic models at the University of Houston in 2008. Ozer Balli joined the faculty of Massey University that same year, rising to full professor in 2022.

As an applied econometrician, Ozer Balli works on topics across international economics and macrofinance, banking, property, and other areas. She has studied aviation efficiency and the forecasting of aviation travel demand in tourism, and topics in real estate such as the effect of windfarms on property values. She has also published on microfinance efficiency, and Islamic finance. She teaches on econometrics, micro and macrofinance, quantitative analysis, and microeconomic theory.

Ozer Balli has served on the editorial board of a number of international journals, including the Eurasian Journal of Business and Economics, and Strategic Financial Review.

Ozer Balli has won a number of awards, including a highly commended in the 2012 Emerald /EFMD MENA Management Research Fund Awards, and a RBNZ-New Zealand Econometric Study Group award in 2010. She has been awarded several Massey Business School awards, including awards for her research impact and her teaching.

== Selected works ==
- Ozer, Hatice; Bent E. Sørensen (2012). "Interaction effects in econometrics". Empirical Economics. 45 (1): 583–603. doi:10.1007/s00181-012-0604-2. Wikidata Q56270309.
- Wai Hong Kan Tsui; Ozer, Hatice; Andrew Gilbey; Gow, Hamish (2014). "Forecasting of Hong Kong airport's passenger throughput". Tourism Management. 42: 62–76. doi:10.1016/j.tourman.2013.10.008. Wikidata Q125246872.
- Ballı, Faruk; Ozer, Hatice; Kemal Cebeci (2013). "Impacts of exported Turkish soap operas and visa-free entry on inbound tourism to Turkey". Tourism Management. 37: 186–192. doi:10.1016/j.tourman.2013.01.013. Wikidata Q125246878.
- Thi Thu Ha Nguyen; Muhammad Abubakr Naeem; Ballı, Faruk; Ozer, Hatice; Xuan Vinh Vo (2021). "Time-frequency comovement among green bonds, stocks, commodities, clean energy, and conventional bonds". Finance Research Letters. 40 101739. doi:10.1016/j.frl.2020.101739. Wikidata Q125246844.
- Ballı, Faruk; Ozer, Hatice; Rosmy Jean Louis (2016). "The impacts of immigrants and institutions on bilateral tourism flows". Tourism Management. 52: 221–229. doi:10.1016/j.tourman.2015.06.021. Wikidata Q125246861.
- Wai Hong Kan Tsui; Ozer, Hatice; Andrew Gilbey; Gow, Hamish (2014). "Operational efficiency of Asia-Pacific airports". Journal of Air Transport Management. 40: 16–24. doi:10.1016/j.jairtraman.2014.05.003. PMC 7148862. PMID 32572317. Wikidata Q96641508.
- Uzma Bibi; Ozer, Hatice; Claire D. Matthews; David W.L. Tripe (2018). "Impact of gender and governance on microfinance efficiency". Journal of International Financial Markets, Institutions and Money. 53: 307–319. doi:10.1016/j.intfin.2017.12.008. Wikidata Q125246854.
