= Surfing in Turkey =

Surfing is a growing sport in Turkey, which offers surfers a variety of wave conditions. The Mediterranean Sea on the south coast provides warm water and consistent waves, while the Black Sea on the north coast offers wind-generated swells.

== Wave conditions ==
Waves in Turkey tend to be shorter than ocean waves, with an average swell period of 6–7 seconds. However, swells can reach up to 11–12 seconds in some areas.

== Southern Turkey (Mediterranean) ==
The Mediterranean coast of southern Turkey is a popular destination for winter surfing due to several factors:

- Warm water temperatures (averaging 65-70°F in winter)
- Consistent waves, particularly in Alanya
- Lower tourist activity and accommodation prices in winter

Alanya is a particularly popular surf spot, with waves reaching up to 20 feet during the winter and spring months. The waves here tend to come from the south, southeast, or east-southeast, with southeast swells producing longer rides.

- Damlatas Beach offers hollow tubing waves, ideal for experienced surfers.
- Keykubat Beach offers a variety of waves suitable for both beginners and experienced surfers, with wave heights ranging from 1 to 12 feet.

== Northern Turkey (Black Sea) ==
The Black Sea also offers surfable waves, with heights ranging from 1 to 12 feet. Surfing in the Black Sea is less developed than in the Mediterranean, but a small community of local surfers exists.

== History of surfing in Turkey ==
The history of modern surfing in Turkey can be traced back to the efforts of Tunc Ucyildiz and the Turkish American Sports Club. Ucyildiz organized the first National Surfing Championship in Istanbul and represented Turkey in the ISA World Surfing Games in 2013.

== Body surfing ==
Body surfing, a traditional activity known as "viya," has existed in Turkey since the Ottoman Empire, particularly in the Black Sea and Mediterranean regions. This tradition continues to this day.
