= Bilkent University =

Private university in Ankara, Turkey

- Bilkent Üniversitesi
- Type: Private research university
- Established: October 20, 1984; 41 years ago
- Founder: İhsan Doğramacı
- Endowment: $300 million (2011)
- President: Ali Doğramacı
- Rector: Orhan Aytür
- Faculty: 1,000
- Students: 13,000
- Location: Çankaya, Ankara, Turkey; 39°52′04.80″N 32°44′55.32″E
- Campus: Urban, 5,000 acres (20 km^{2})
- Language: English
- Colors: Red Blue
- Nicknames: Bilkent Judges (American football)
- Mascot: Bilkent Fox
- Website: w3.bilkent.edu.tr

Bilkent University (Turkish: Bilkent Üniversitesi) is a private non-profit research university located in Ankara, Turkey. It was founded by İhsan Doğramacı, the first president of the Council of Higher Education and the head of the prominent Doğramacı family, with the aim of creating a center of excellence in higher education and research in 1984. It has constantly been ranked among the top Turkish universities since its establishment. In 2011, it was ranked 112th in the world by Times World University Rankings. Bilkent University was the first non-profit private university established in the country. The name Bilkent is an abbreviation of bilim kenti, meaning "city of science" in Turkish.

== History ==
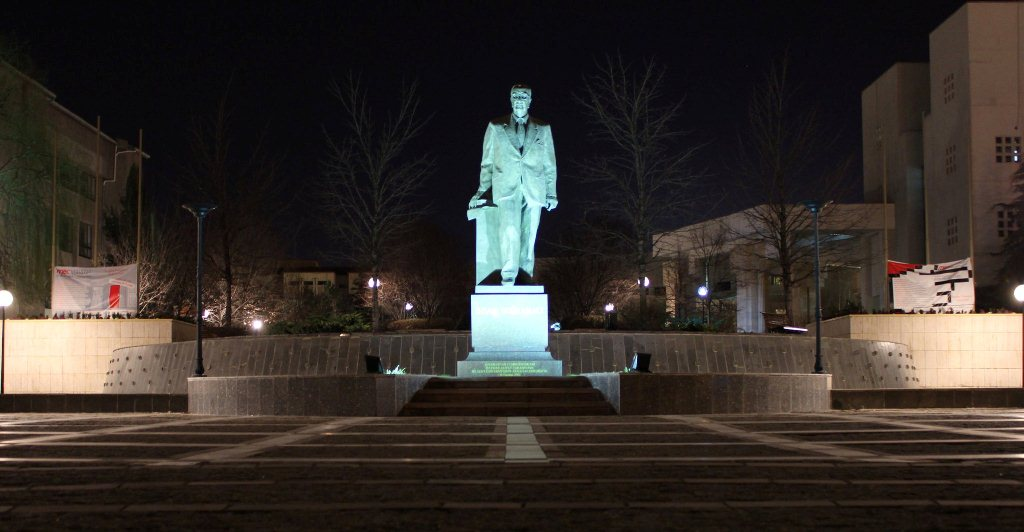
Statue of Bilkent's founder İhsan Doğramacı in the main campus square

The idea of establishing Bilkent University dates to the 1940s. While working at Harvard University and the University of Washington, İhsan Doğramacı was influenced by the higher education and civil society models of the United States. Upon his return to Turkey in 1951, he initiated several projects in health and education, including the establishment of Hacettepe Medical Center, Hacettepe Hospital, Hacettepe University Medical School, and Hacettepe University. He also contributed to the foundation of public universities including Atatürk University Faculty of Medicine, Cumhuriyet University, and Erciyes University. Having achieved his objectives in medicine, Doğramacı sought to establish a nonprofit private university and his goal was to create an internationally recognized institution that could attract students from abroad. At the time, constitutional restrictions in Turkey prevented the establishment of private universities.

In the 1960s, Doğramacı identified land in southwestern Ankara as suitable for the project, primarily due to its natural resources. To generate financial resources, he established a furniture factory that later became part of the Tepe Group.

Following the 1980 Turkish coup d'état, constitutional amendments permitted the foundation of private universities. Preparations for the Bilkent campus began shortly thereafter, with the first buildings including the library, housing facilities, and an engineering block. The university was officially founded in 1984 and admitted its first students in 1986.

Bilkent began academic activities in 1986 with 386 students. In 1992, legislation passed by the Grand National Assembly of Turkey confirmed Bilkent's university status. Since then, Bilkent has expanded to include nine faculties, two schools, and three vocational schools. It maintains exchange agreements with over 250 universities in North America, East Asia, and Europe, and annually hosts numerous academic and professional events. The university has produced over 30,000 graduates, and in 2015 was ranked 28th worldwide in the Times Higher Education list of the best universities under 50 years old.

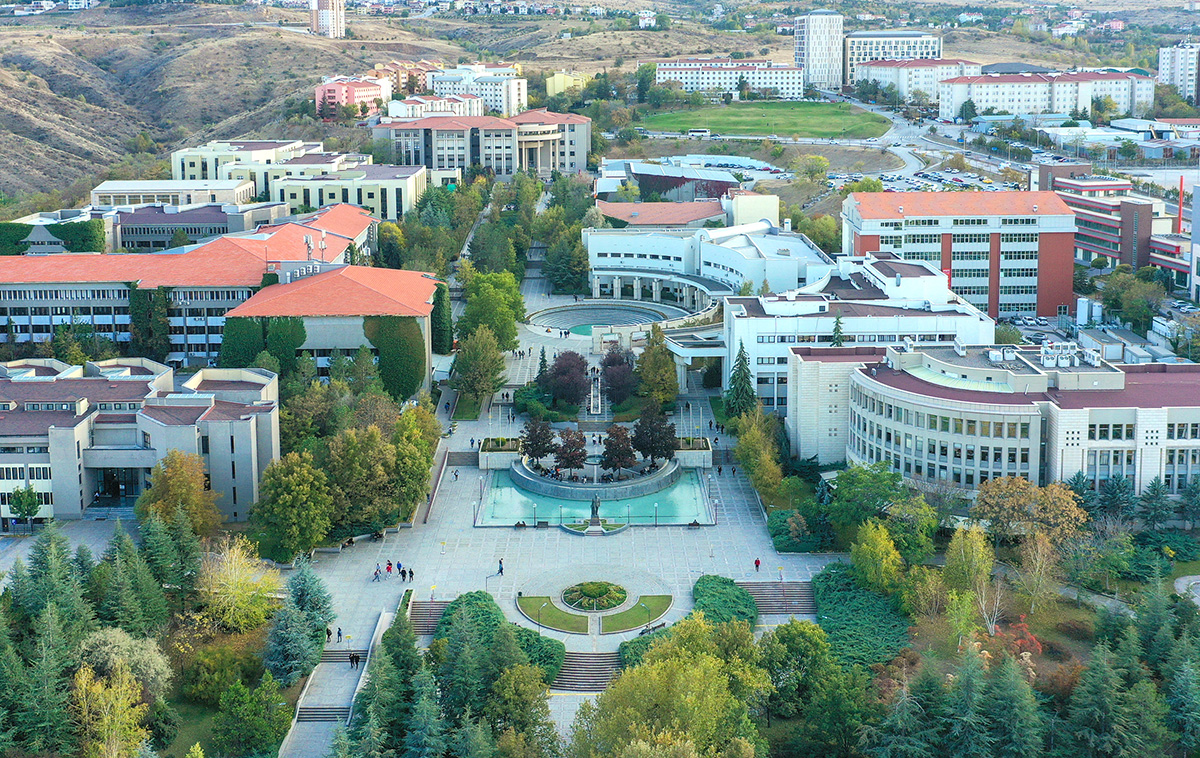
Bilkent University's Main Campus Square

== Campus ==
The university occupies three campuses. They are located about 12 km west of the center of Ankara, and cover a total area of more than 300 hectares.

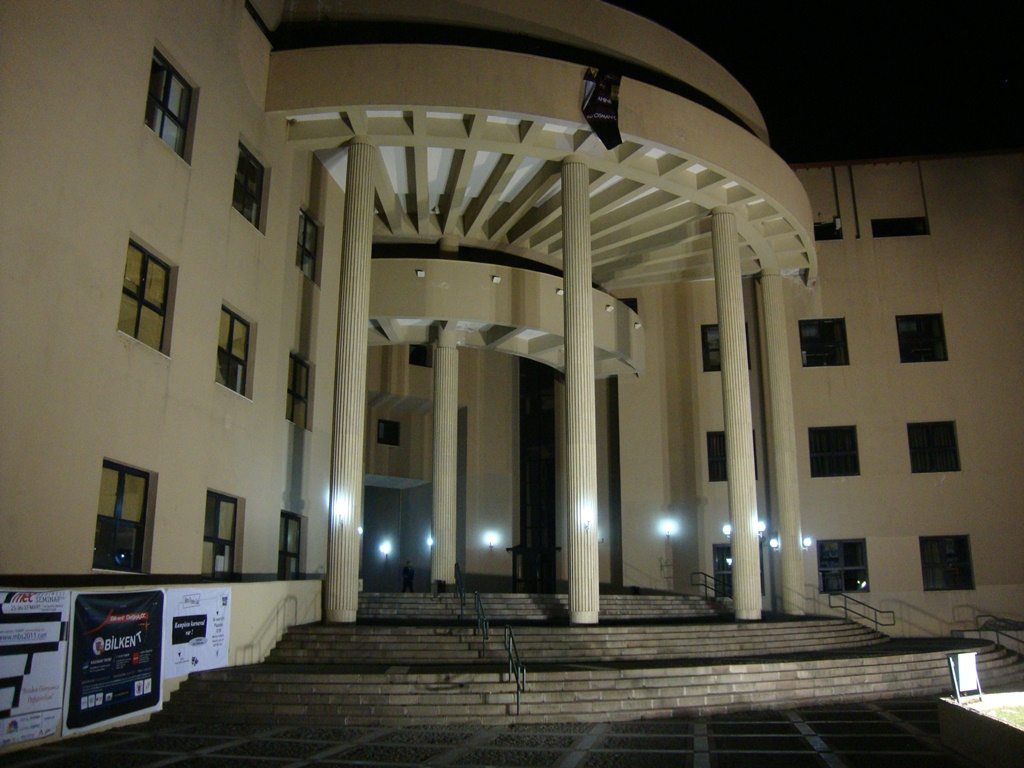
Bilkent University Faculty of Art, Design and Architecture

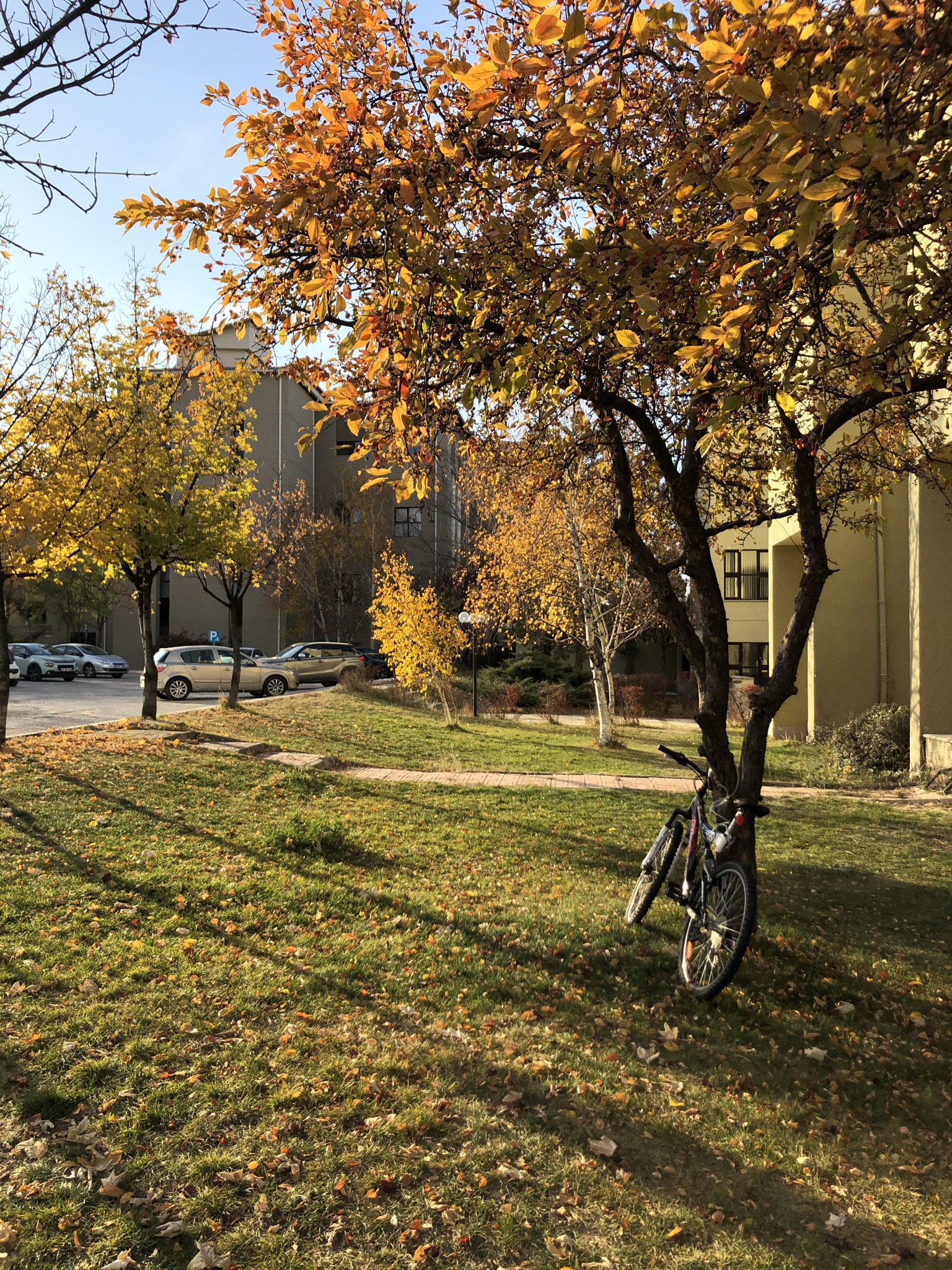
Bilkent University Main Campus

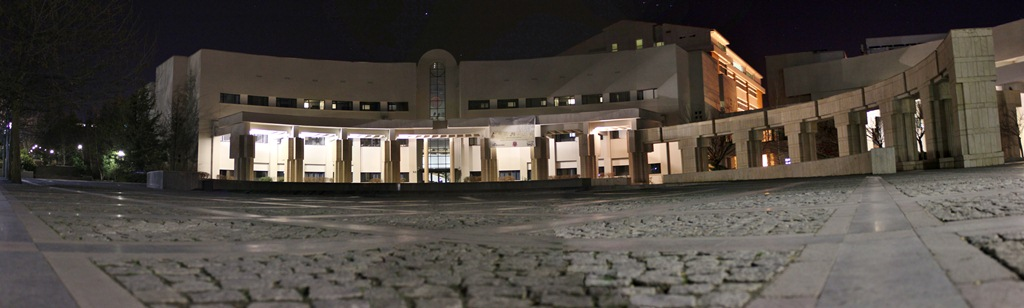
Bilkent University Faculty of Science

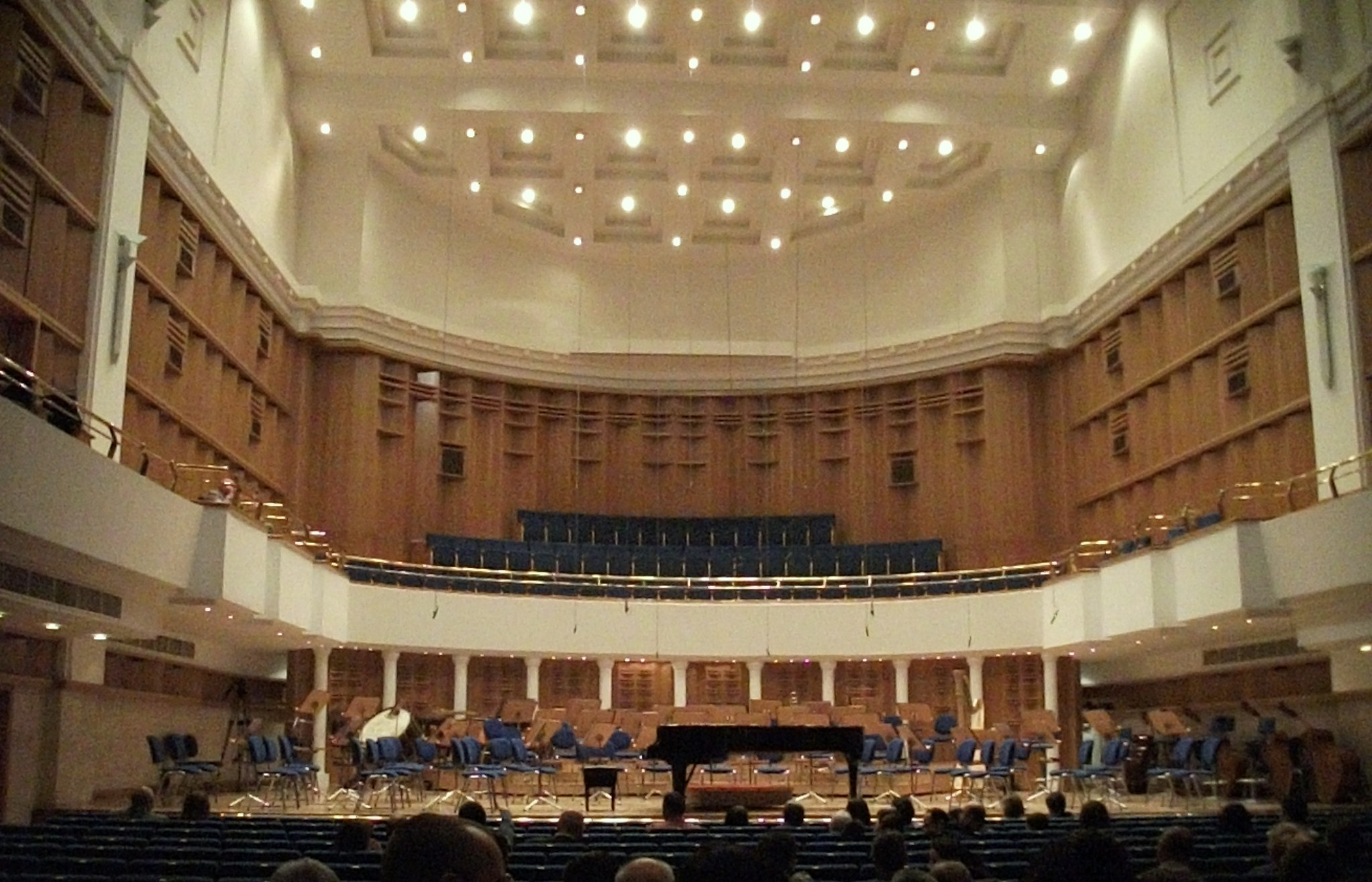
Bilkent University Concert Hall

=== Library ===
The university library houses a large collection of books with annual acquisitions valued at over 3 million U.S. dollars. As of 2017, Bilkent University Library is the largest university library of Turkey, and it is the only university library to rank in the top 10 libraries in the country.

In addition to books, the collection includes periodical subscriptions, microforms, access to numerous online databases and electronic journals. Sheet music and sound recordings are available in the music rooms. The library also hosts a number of private collections and an exhibition hall.

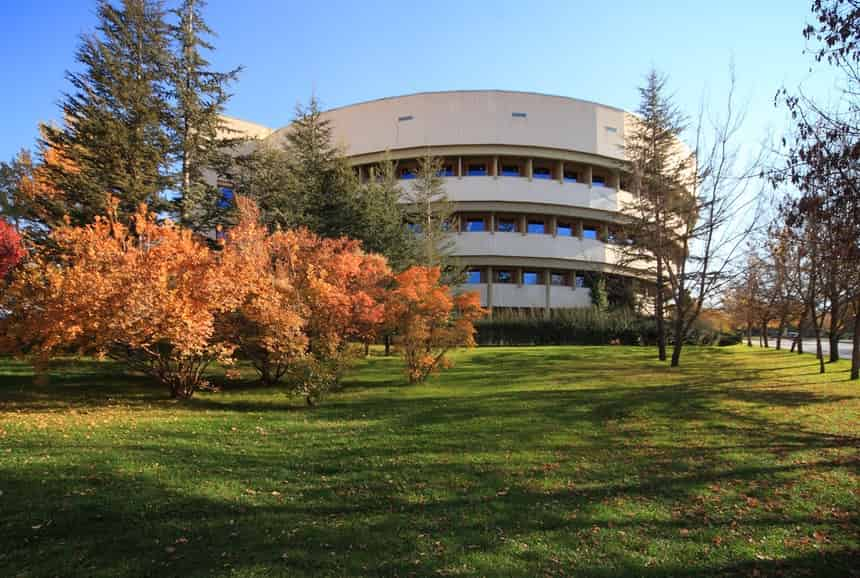
Bilkent University Main Library

== Academics ==
The university offers 33 undergraduate majors, together with 32 graduate programs spanning 22 different fields.

=== Faculties ===
- Faculty of Applied Sciences
- Faculty of Art, Design and Architecture
- Faculty of Business Administration
- Faculty of Economics, Administrative and Social Sciences
- Faculty of Education
- Faculty of Engineering
- Faculty of Humanities and Letters
- Faculty of Law
- Faculty of Music and Performing Arts
- Faculty of Science

=== Schools ===
- Graduate School of Education
- School of Applied Languages
- School of Applied Technology and Management
- Vocational School of Computer Technology and Office Management
- Vocational School of Tourism and Hotel Services

== Rankings ==
University rankings

Global – Overall
- ARWU World: 801–900 (2020)
- QS World: 415 (2026)
- THE World: 601–800 (2024)
- USNWR Global: =684 (2023)

Regional – Overall
- QS Emerging Europe and Central Asia: 20 (2022)

The Times Higher Education World University Rankings consistently ranks Bilkent University as one of the top universities in Turkey.

Year	Turkey	In Asia	In the World
2010-11	1st	14th	112th
2011-12	1st	21st	201-225th
2012-13	2nd	27th	226-250th
2013-14	4th	31st	226-250th
2014-15	5th	25th	201-225th
2015-16	3rd	45th	351-400th
2016-17	3rd	46th	351-400th
2017-18	3rd	54th	401-500th
2018-19	3rd	82nd	501-600th
2019-20	3rd	n/a	501-600th

Bilkent, as a university with less than 50 years of history, is also ranked as one of the most prestigious younger universities in the world:

Year	Turkey	In the world
2012	1st	32nd
2013	2nd	39th
2014	1st	31st
2015	2nd	28th
2016	3rd	76th

THE powered by Thomson Reuters ranked Bilkent in the category BRICS & Emerging Economies as follows:

Year	Turkey	In the world
2014	4th	12th
2015	5th	19th
2016	3rd	41st

Bilkent University is particularly noted for the quality of its Faculty of Engineering. The Times Higher Education World University Rankings rank Bilkent among the top 100 universities for Engineering and Technology, as follows:

Year	Turkey	In the world
2013-14	1st	98th

The Faculty of Business Administration of Bilkent University was the first business school in Turkey to be accredited by AACSB; less than 5% of the business schools around the world have received this accreditation. The business school has been ranked by Eduniversal among the best business schools of the Eurasia region for international influence.

According to the QS World University Rankings of 2012 and 2013 the university ranks in the 151–200 range in the subject of "Economics & Econometrics".

== Student life ==
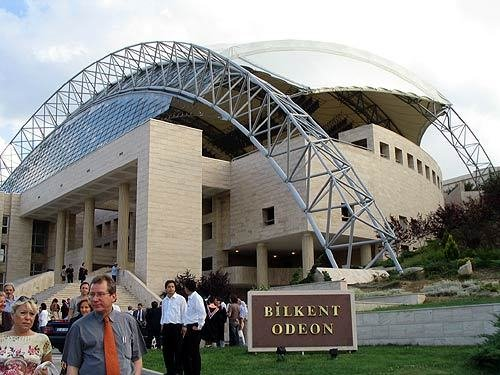
Bilkent University Odeon Outdoor Concert Hall

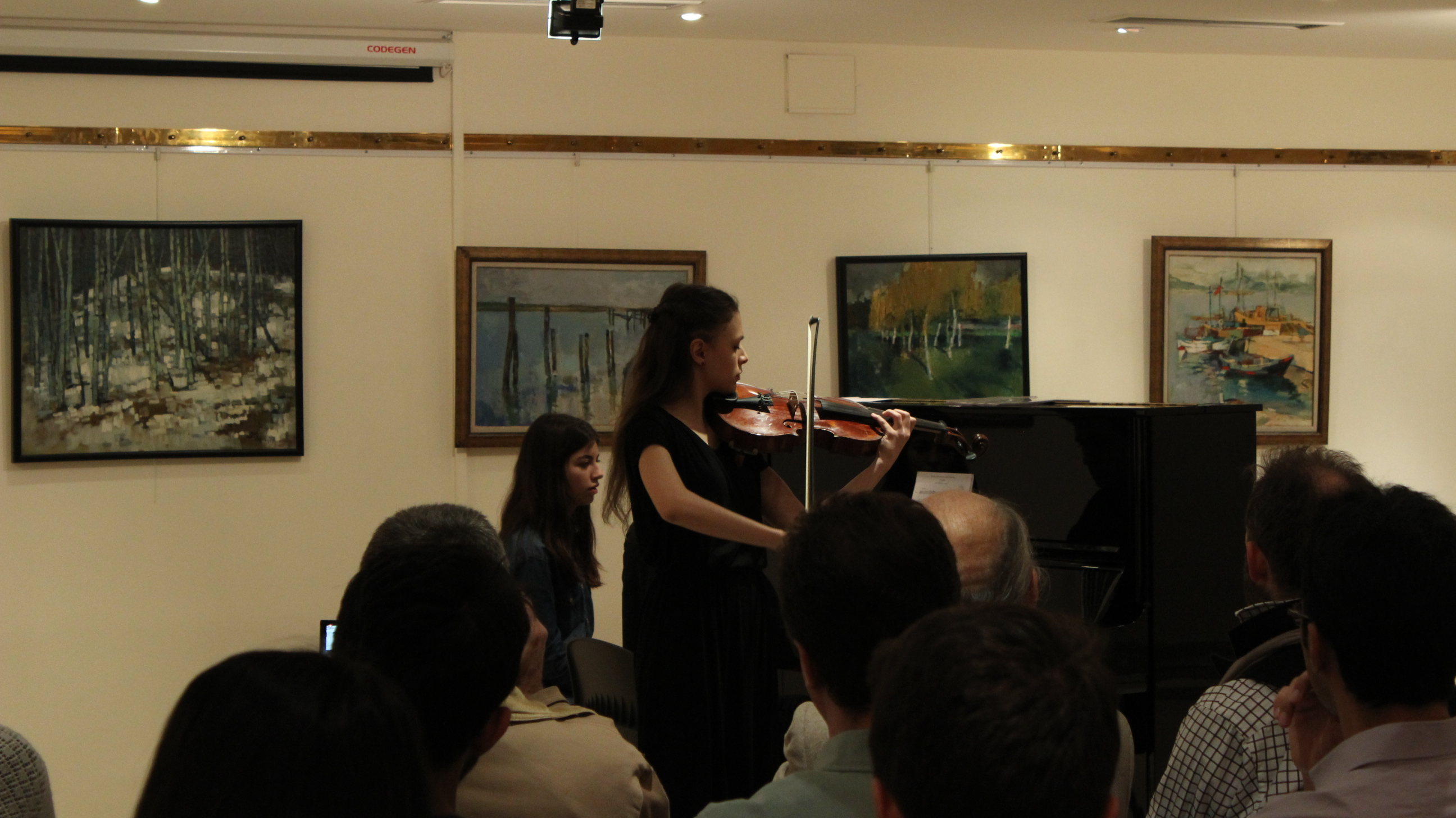
A student from the Faculty of Music and Performing Arts, performing in the Bilkent University Library Art Gallery.

=== Sports ===
Students can participate in many sports courses and be trained by university staff, mostly for free. The university presents many individuals and teams in different sports in varsity competitions. The most well-known sport teams of the university are the Bilkent Goats and the Bilkent Judges, the ultimate team and the football team, respectively.

=== Student unions and clubs ===
The board and the departmental members of the Bilkent Student Union are chosen annually among all registered university students. The Student Union is the main sponsor and the organizer of Mayfest, the traditional Bilkent University summer festival. Various student clubs organize regular activities every day on and off the campus, mostly open to everyone. All students are allowed to join, or participate in the events and activities of any club they wish to. Student union and club activities are coordinated under the supervision of Student Events Center of Bilkent.

=== Recreation ===
Bilkent University is host to numerous events regarding music and the performing arts. The university also sponsors frequent lectures, art exhibitions, and literary evenings throughout the academic year. During the first week of may, each year Mayfest is held. Mayfest is a well-known festival among the youth of Ankara, consisting of a large number of activities, as well as open-air concerts where renowned Turkish pop and rock bands and singers take the stage every night throughout the week.

== Affiliations ==
=== Centers ===
- National Research Center for Magnetic Resonance (UMRAM)
- Bilkent University Center for European Union Affairs
- Ahmed Adnan Saygun Center for Music Research and Education
- Bilkent Center for Advanced Studies (BICAS)
- Center for Mind, Language & Culture
- Center for Brain Research
- Center for Environmental Sciences
- Center for International Economics
- Center for Russian Studies
- Center for Studies in Society and Politics
- Center for Turkish Language and Speech Processing
- Center for Turkish Politics and History
- Center for Research in Transitional Societies (CRTS)
- Center for Turkish Literature
- Communications and Spectrum Management Research Center (ISYAM)
- Genetics and Biotechnology Research and Development Center (BILGEN)
- Halil Inalcık Center of Ottoman Studies
- Nanotechnology Research Center (NANOTAM)
- National Nanotechnology Research Center (UNAM)
- Bilkent University Computational Electromagnetics Research Center (BiLCEM)

=== Cyberpark ===
Bilkent Cyberpark, founded in 2002, is the fastest growing techno park in Turkey serving with 240 technology-based companies, one micro nano chip factory, five research centers, and 4,000 personnel.

=== Institutes ===
- Institute of Economic and Social Sciences
- Institute of Engineering and Science
- Institute of Fine Arts
- Institute of Music and Performing Arts
- Institute of World Systems, Economies and Strategic Research
- Institute of Materials Science and Nanotechnology

== Notable people ==
=== Faculty ===
- Abdullah Atalar — Turkish scientist
- Mustafa Akgül — Turkish computer scientist
- Gürer Aykal — Turkish conductor, former principal conductor of the Borusan Istanbul Philharmonic Orchestra
- Orhan Aytür — Turkish professor of optoelectronics
- István Aranyosi — Hungarian philosopher
- Julian Bennett — British archaeologist
- Sandrine Bergès — French philosopher and novelist
- Erdal Arıkan — Turkish electrical engineer, known for his invention of polar codes, which is a key component of 5G technologies
- Hilmi Volkan Demir — Turkish scientist, known for his works on white light generation
- Erol Erdinç — Turkish conductor
- Jason Hale — American actor and theatre director
- Talat Sait Halman, GBE — Turkish poet, translator, cultural historian and Shakespeare scholar, first Minister of Culture of Turkey
- Halil İnalcık — Turkish historian, professor emeritus at University of Chicago
- Suna Kan — Turkish violinist
- Gülsin Onay — Turkish pianist
- İlber Ortaylı — Turkish historian
- Sami Selçuk — Turkish jurist and former president of Court of Cassation
- Stanford J. Shaw — American historian
- Fazıl Say — Turkish pianist and composer
- Norman Stone — British historian and Margaret Thatcher's foreign policy advisor on Europe
- Hikmet Sami Türk — Turkish academic and former Minister of National Defense of Turkey

=== Alumni ===
- Haluk Akakçe — Painter and audiovisual artist
- Mete Atatüre — Turkish physicist at Cavendish Laboratory, University of Cambridge
- Erdem Başçı — Former governor of the Central Bank of the Republic of Turkey
- Esra Bilgiç Töre — Actress
- Hatice Özer Ballı — Professor of applied econometrics at Massey University
- Yiğit Bulut — Journalist and a former senior advisor to President Recep Tayyip Erdoğan
- Orkut Büyükkökten — Employee of Google who developed the social networking service called Orkut
- Mevlüt Çavuşoğlu — Diplomat and politician; former Minister of Foreign Affairs of Turkey
- Hande Dalkılıç — Pianist
- Demir Demirkan — Rock musician
- Vuslat Doğan Sabancı — Former chairwoman of Hürriyet, board member of Doğan Holding
- Mehmet Burak Erdoğan — Turkish mathematician at University of Illinois Urbana-Champaign
- Hakan Fidan — Minister of Foreign Affairs of Turkey, former soldier, academic and the head of the National Intelligence Organization
- Şahan Gökbakar — Comedian
- Tarkan Gözübüyük — Musician as known from Pentagram, producer
- Gizem Girişmen — Paralympic archer and gold medalist at the 2008 Summer Paralympics
- Murat Han — Actor
- Tamer Karadağlı — Actor and director of Turkish State Theatres
- Binnur Kaya — Actress
- Pınar Keskinocak — Turkish-American systems engineer at the Georgia Institute of Technology
- Başak Köklükaya — Actress
- Nasuh Mahruki — Mountaineer, first Turk to climb Mount Everest and the founder of search and rescue team AKUT
- Nevşin Mengü — News reporter
- Gizem Memiç — Former Miss Turkey titleholder who represented Turkey both in Miss Universe and Miss World in 2010
- Burçin Mutlu-Pakdil — Turkish-American astrophysicist at Dartmouth College
- Yasemin Mori — Musician
- Ibrahim Sirkeci — Professor of Transnational Studies and Marketing at Regent's University London
- Cevdet Yılmaz — Vice president of Turkey; former Deputy Prime Minister of Turkey and Minister of Development
- Emrah Yücel — Graphic designer and president of the Turkish Film Festival
- Kaan Tangöze — Rock musician as known from Duman
- Seth Ariel Tongay — Jewish-American materials engineer at Arizona State University

== See also ==
- Bilkent Laboratory and International School
- Bilkent Erzurum
- Bilkent Symphony Orchestra
- Bilkent Concert Hall
- List of universities in Ankara
- List of universities in Turkey
- Education in Turkey
