= Bilkent Concert Hall =

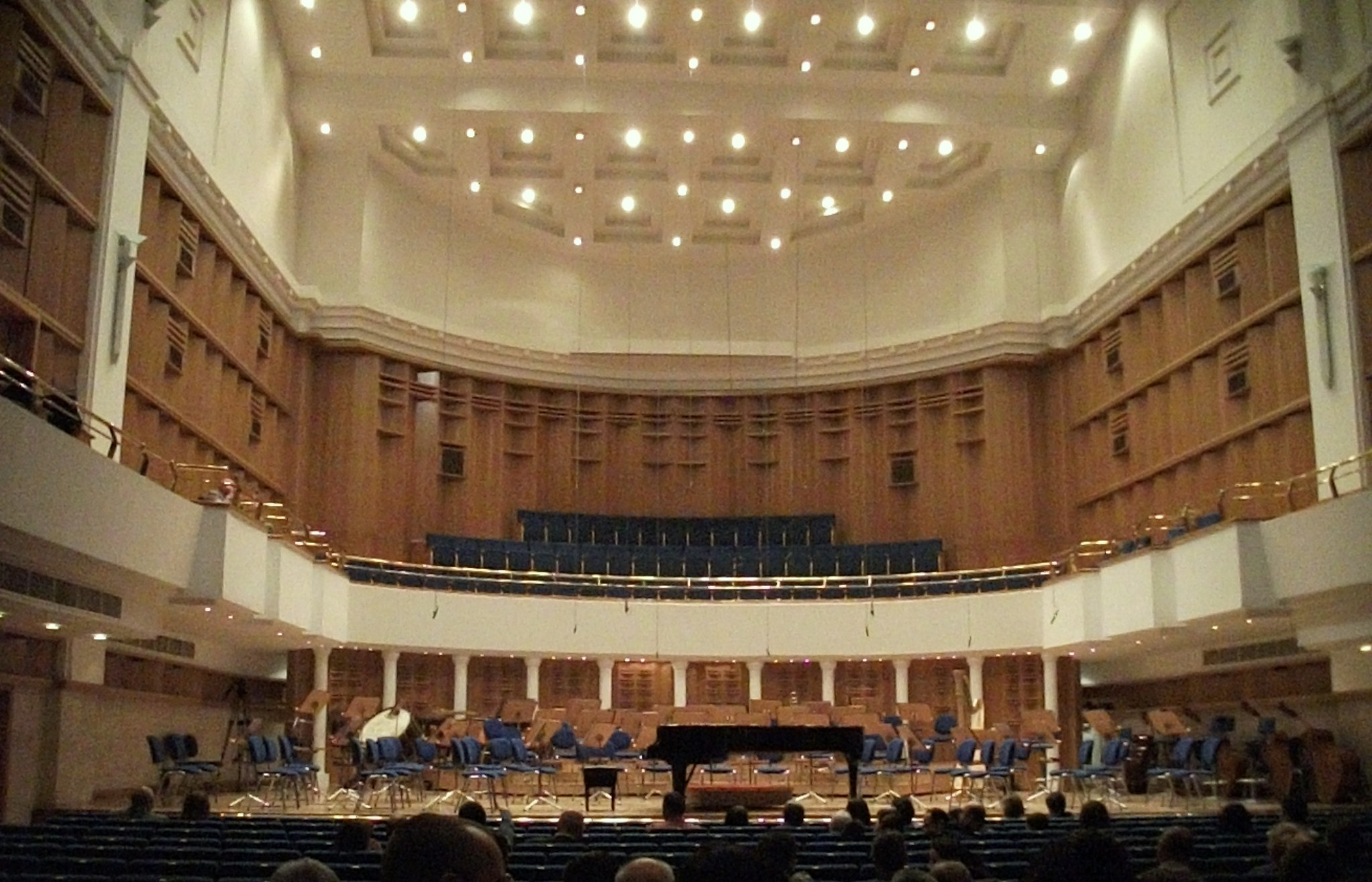
- Bilkent Concert Hall

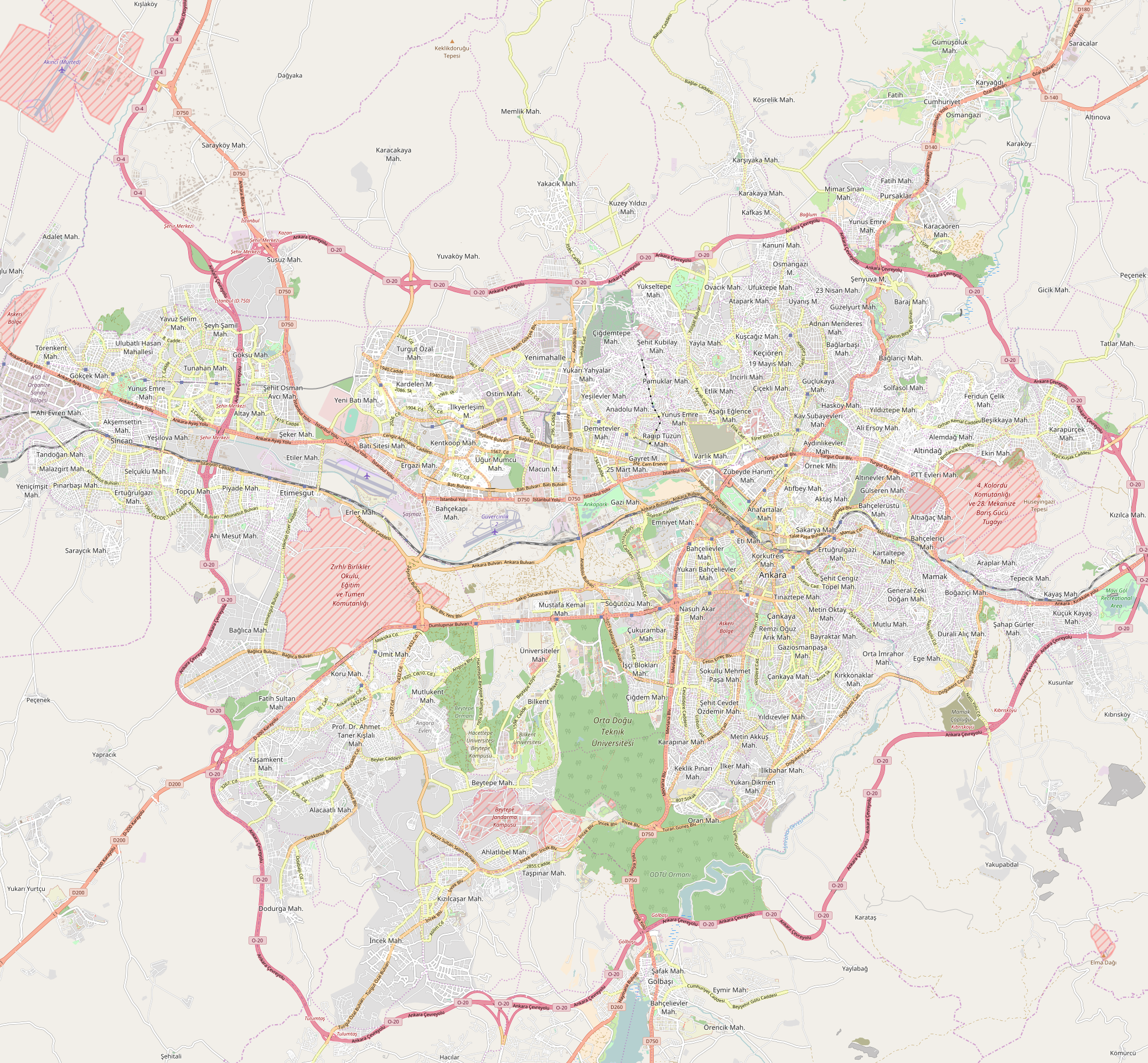
- Location within Ankara Location within Turkey
- Address: Ankara; Turkey
- Coordinates: 39.8689242°N 32.754968°E
- Owner: Bilkent University
- Capacity: Bilkent Concert Hall: 750; Bilkent Theatre: 200
- Type: Concert hall

Construction
- Opened: November 1, 1994
- Architects: Erkut Şahinbaş, İlhan Kural

Website
- Official website

Bilkent Concert Hall (Turkish: Bilkent Konser Salonu) is a performing arts center in Turkey. It is located within the Bilkent University campus in Ankara. Home to the Bilkent Symphony Orchestra, the building hosts over 80 concerts per year. Besides the concert hall itself, the building houses seminar rooms, academic staff offices, classrooms and studios for the university's Faculty of Music and Performance Arts, together with an arena theatre for performances from theatre studies students.

== Construction and design ==
Bilkent Concert Hall houses a faculty, a concert hall and a theatre building. Architects İlhan Kural and Erkut Şahinbaş designed a central hall type building. While the concert hall, theatre building, and studios are located towards the core of the building to provide sound isolation, offices and classrooms are located facing outwards and around the core, to provide the necessary exposure to daylight.

Acoustics consultant Matti Heikkinen worked on designing the acoustics for the concert hall. The structure was built by construction company Tepe, itself owned by Bilkent University. The architects involved received a nomination for 5th National Architecture Grand Prize. The opening concert of the concert hall was given by the Bilkent Symphony Orchestra in 1994.

== Facilities ==
The building, which consists of three floors, encompasses an area of nearly 14.500 m2. The concert hall stage includes a stage lift which allows for the formation an orchestra pit used in operas. Two Steinway concert grand pianos are available. The interior walls of the concert hall are coated with movable acoustic panels, which make the concert hall a recording studio as well. The building hosts concerts in its concert hall for 750 seats and its foyer, performances of theatre students in its arena theatre for 200 seats and houses studios, seminar rooms, classrooms, a cafeteria and a café.

== See also ==
- Bilkent University
- Bilkent Symphony Orchestra
