= Sandrine Bergès =

French philosopher and novelist (born 1970)

Sandrine Berges
- Born: 1970 (age 55–56)

Education
- Education: University of Leeds (PhD); Birkbeck College, London (MPhil); King's College London (BA)
- Thesis: Plato's Defence of Justice: Socrates contra Nietzsche (2000)

Philosophical work
- Era: 21st-century philosophy
- Region: Western philosophy
- School: Analytic philosophy
- Institutions: Bilkent University
- Main interests: ethics, political philosophy
- Website: http://sandrineberges.weebly.com/

Sandrine Berges (born 1970) is a French philosopher and novelist, currently Professor of Philosophy at Bilkent University. She is known for her works on feminist philosophy, ethics and political philosophy.

== Books ==
Bergès has written a number of non-fiction books on philosophy and political theory, including:

- Plato on Virtue and the Law, Continuum, 2012
- The Routledge Guidebook to Wollstonecraft's A Vindication of the Rights of Woman, Routledge, 2013
- A Feminist Perspective on Virtue Ethics, Palgrave Macmillan, 2015
- The Social and Political Philosophy of Mary Wollstonecraft, edited by Sandrine Bergès and Alan Coffee, Oxford University Press, 2017
- Women Philosophers on Autonomy: Historical and Contemporary Perspectives, edited by Sandrine Berges and Alberto L. Siani, Routledge, 2018
- The Wollstonecraftian Mind, edited by Sandrine Bergès, Eileen Hunt Botting and Alan Coffee, Routledge, 2019
- Sophie de Grouchy's Letters on Sympathy: A Critical Engagement with Adam Smith's The Theory of Moral Sentiments, Translated by Sandrine Berges, Oxford University Press, 2019

She is also the author of the Martha Freud historical fantasy novels:

- The Nietzsche Affair, Ellipsis Imprints, 2022.
