= Julian Bennett (archaeologist) =

British archeologist (1949–2025)

Julian Bennett (9 June 1949 – 29 January 2025) was a British archaeologist.

== Life and career ==
After leaving secondary school, Bennett worked as a freelance archaeologist in England and Germany, before entering the University of Durham as a mature student where he graduated with a BA (Hons) in Archaeology in 1978. After preliminary graduate study at Newcastle University, he was appointed an Excavations Director for English Heritage, continuing with part-time graduate studies to eventually be awarded his PhD in 1991. The title of his PhD thesis was The Setting, Development and Function of the Hadrianic Frontier in Britain. From 1985 to 1995, Bennett worked for a New York travel company, guiding for institutions such as the Smithsonian and the Metropolitan Museum of Art, and working as Tour Leader and Archaeological Guide Lecturer on boat cruises around Europe and Scandinavia, the Mediterranean World, and South America.

In 1995 Bennett became a professor at Bilkent University in Ankara. His areas of expertise were: provincial and military Roman archeology, late Roman and Byzantine architecture in Turkey, the Roman Empire and the Roman army and the study of late antique and Medieval architecture. He published numerous monographs and articles on various aspects of Roman and Medieval Britain and the Roman army, and was the author of two books, Towns in Roman Britain (1980) and Trajan. Optimus Princeps. A Life And Times (1997). The latter has been translated into Romanian and Russian.

Bennett's fieldwork experience extended from rural and urban salvage excavations in Britain, Romania, and Germany to a later research project, studying the architecture of the Moldavian and Ottoman castle of Belgorod-Akkerman, in Ukraine. He was elected a Fellow of the Society of Antiquaries of London in 2002, becoming only the third person in Turkey to receive that distinction. Bennett appeared in many TV documentaries for the BBC, The History Channel and National Geographic.

Bennett had one daughter, Laura I. H. Bennett (b. 1984) and two sons, Alexander Ş. W. Bennett (b. 2006), Arthur K. W. Bennett (b. 2009). He died on 29 January 2025, at the age of 75.

== Works ==
- Trajan. Optimus Princeps. A Life And Times. 1997, 2. edition, Routledge, London 2001, ISBN 0-415-16524-5.
- Towns in Roman Britain. 1980, 4. edition, Shire 2001, ISBN 0-7478-0473-7
