= Hilmi Volkan Demir =

Turkish scientist

- Hilmi Volkan Demir
- Born: July 4, 1976; Kağızman, Kars, Turkey
- Education: Bilkent University; Stanford University
- Known for: White light generation
- Awards: ESF EURYI Award, METU Parlar Young Scientist Award, TUBA-GEBIP Young Scientists Award, EU Marie Curie Fellowship Award
- Scientific career
- Fields: Optoelectronics, photonics
- Workplaces: Bilkent University; Nanyang Technological University
- Doctoral advisor: David A. B. Miller

Hilmi Volkan Demir is a Turkish scientist, best known for his works on white light generation.

== Biography ==
Hilmi Volkan Demir was born on July 4, 1976, in Kars, Turkey. He received his B.Sc. degree in electrical and electronics engineering from Bilkent University, Ankara, Turkey, in 1998, and his M.S. and Ph.D. degrees in electrical engineering from Stanford University, California, in 2000 and 2004, respectively. He received his Docent title (Assoc. Prof.) in Optics and Photonics from the Turkish Council of Higher Education in 2007. Since September 2004, he has been working as a faculty member at Bilkent University, where he holds joint appointments at the Department of Physics and at the Department of Electrical and Electronics Engineering. He is the Associate Director of Nanotechnology Research Center. He also serves as a faculty member of the Advanced Research Laboratory and the Institute of Materials Science and Nanotechnology. In August 2009, he was assigned as Nanyang Associate Professor jointly at the School of Electrical and Electronic Engineering (Microelectronics Div.) and the School of Physical and Mathematical Sciences (Physics and Applied Physics Division) at the Nanyang Technological University, Singapore.

=== Research ===
At Bilkent, he is the principal investigator of the Devices and Sensors Research Group. His current research interests and projects include the development and demonstration of innovative hybrid nanophotonic devices, nanocrystal, metal nanoparticle and nanowire embedded nanodevices, high-performance RF and Optoelectronics sensors, III-nitride optoelectronic devices, white LEDs, and photovoltaic devices. He has published more than 100 peer-reviewed research articles in major scientific journals and conferences, presented more than 100 invited lectures, seminars, and conference talks around the world, and has more than 10 patents at various stages of the process. He has an overall h-index of 34 and i10-index of 100, as per Google Scholar.

=== Awards ===
Dr. Demir is one of the winners of 2007 ESF-EURYI. He is also the recipient of 2008 METU Parlar Young Scientist Award, 2006 TUBA-GEBIP (Turkish National Academy of Sciences Distinguished Young Scientist Award), and 2005 European Union Marie Curie Fellowship Award. He is a member of the professional societies such as the Optical Society, IEEE Photonics Society, IEEE, and SPIE and the alumni associations of Stanford University, Bilkent University, and Ankara Science High School.
