= Sami Selçuk =

Sami Selçuk (born 1937 in Konya, Turkey), is a Turkish jurist, professor of law at the Bilkent University in Ankara. He is also former First President of Court of Cassation of Turkey. He was graduated from Ankara University, Law School in 1959 then he began to work as public prosecutor. On July 7, 1999, he elected the First President of Court of Cassation of Turkey. He retired this job on June 15, 2002. He knows French and Italian languages.

== His works ==
He wrote many books about law especially Turkish law system.

1. “Dolandırıcılık”, İstanbul, 1982;
2. “Cinayet Mahkemesi Anıları”, (Andre Gide'den Çeviri), Ankara, 1983;
3. “Dolandırıcılık Cürmünün Kimi Suçlardan Ayırımı”, Ankara, 1986;
4. “Temsili ve Katılımcı Demokrasinin Kökeni”, İstanbul, 1987;
5. “Toplumsal Savunma İlkeleri”, (Filippo Gramatica'dan çeviri), 1988;
6. “Çürütmeler”, İstanbul, 1990;
7. “Önce Dil”, Ankara, 1993;
8. “Çek Suçları”, Ankara, 1993;
9. “Laiklik”, İstanbul, 1994;
10. “Kızlık Bozma Suçu”, Ankara, 1996;
11. “Zorba Devletten Hukukun Üstünlüğüne”, Ankara, 1998;
12. “Demokrasiye Doğru”, Ankara, 1999;
13. “Konuşma”, Ankara, 1999;
14. “Özlenen Demokratik Türkiye”, Ankara, 2000;
15. “Longing for Democracy”, 2000
