= Joseph W. Willard =

Deputy Minister of Welfare
- In office 1960–?

Chairman of UNICEF
- In office 1966–1968
- Preceded by: Zina Harman
- Succeeded by: İhsan Doğramacı

Personal details
- Born: 1917 Hamilton, Ontario, Canada
- Died: 31 January 1981 (aged 63–64) Almonte, Ontario, Canada

Joseph W. Willard (1917 – 31 January 1981) was a Canadian politician, economist and civil servant in the public health field. He served as Chairman of UNICEF from 1966 to 1968, and as Deputy Minister of Welfare in the Department of National Health and Welfare from 1960.

Willard received a B.A. and an M.A. in political science and economics at the University of Toronto. He then undertook postgraduate studies in government and economics at the University of Toronto and Harvard University, and was a Littauer Fellow at the Harvard Graduate School of Public Administration. He earned a Master of Public Administration degree and a PhD in economics in 1954 at Harvard University.

Willard was Director of the research division of the Department of National Health and Welfare from 1947 to 1960, and served as Deputy Minister of Welfare from 1960. In 1969 he was Acting Deputy Minister of National Health.
