= Anna Minguzzi =

Italian physicist

Anna Minguzzi (born circa 1973) is an Italian condensed matter physicist who works in France as a director of research for the French National Centre for Scientific Research, affiliated with the Laboratoire de Physique et Modélisation des Milieux Condensés (LPMMC) in Grenoble. Her research involves quantum fluids, gases of ultracold atoms, fermionic condensates, Bose–Einstein condensates, exciton-polaritons, and atomtronics.

== Education ==
Minguzzi studied physics at the Scuola Normale Superiore di Pisa, where she earned her Ph.D. in 1999. She continued to work at the Scuola Normale Superiore di Pisa, in the Istituto nazionale per la fisica della materia, until moving to her present position at CNRS in 2005. There, she directed the Laboratoire de Physique et Modélisation des Milieux Condensés from 2014 to 2020, headed the condensed matter division of the Société Française de Physique, led the Quantum Grenoble project, and founded the QuantAlps Research Federation, quantum computing collaborations centered at Grenoble Alpes University.

== Recognition ==
Minguzzi was the 2018 winner of the Louis Ancel Prize of the Société Française de Physique. She received the CNRS Silver Medal in 2023.
