= Tunc Ucyildiz =

Turkish surfer (born 1978)

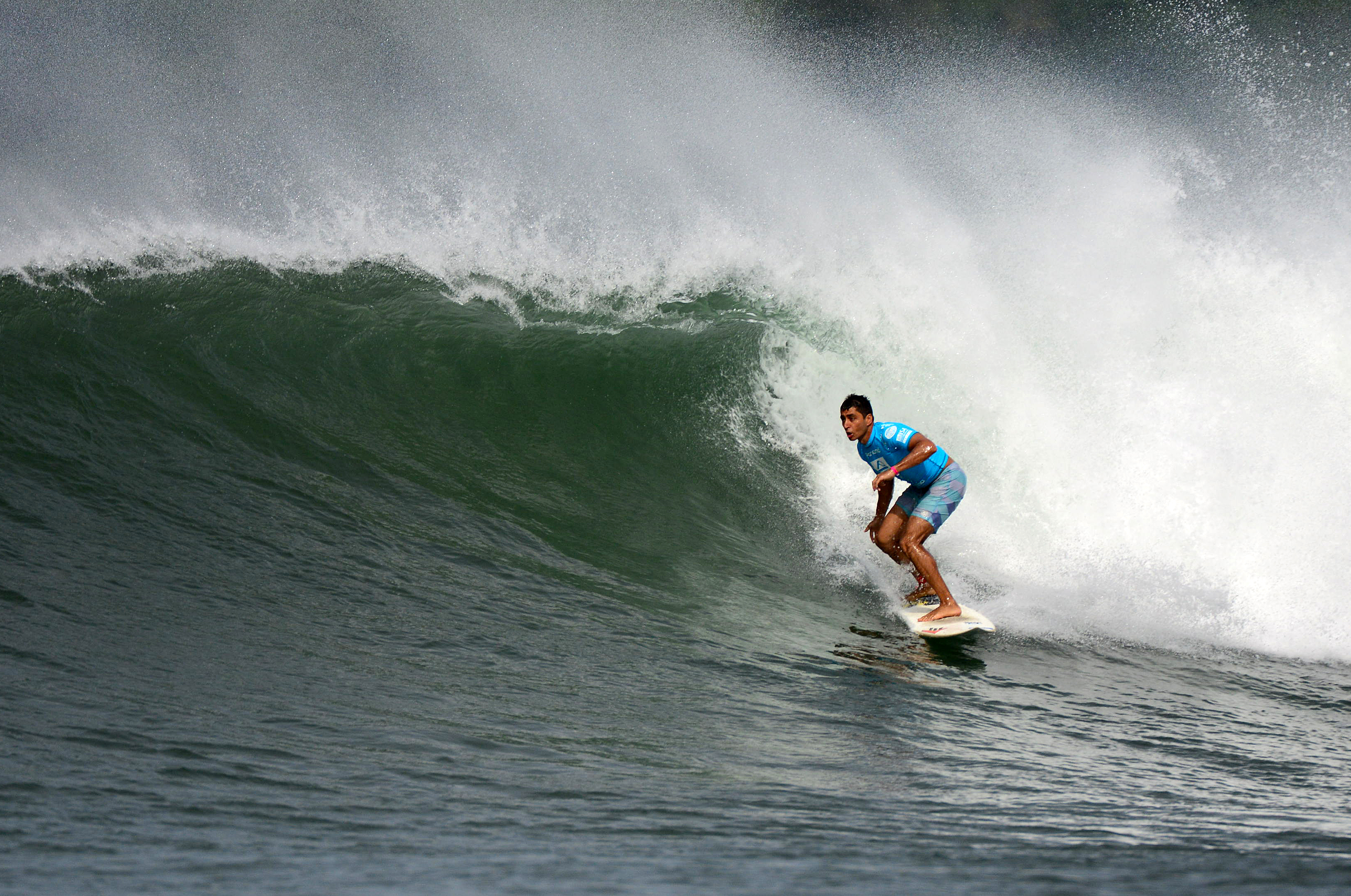

Personal information
- Born: April 22, 1978 (age 48) Ankara, Turkey
- Years active: 2001–present
- Height: 5 ft 9 in (1.75 m)
- Weight: 160 lb (73 kg)
- Website: www.tuncucyildiz.com

Surfing career
- Sport: Surfing
- Sponsors: Firewire Surfboards, Turkish American Sports Club
- Major achievements: First National Surfing Champion of Turkey First surfer to represent Turkey in ISA World Surfing Championship in 2013.

Surfing specifications
- Stance: Regular (natural) foot (left foot forward)
- Shaper: Firewire
- Quiver: 5'10" squash tail Firewire, 6'3" Firewire pintail gun
- Favorite waves: Alanya Turkey, North Jersey USA, Long Beach NY USA, Trestles California
- Favorite maneuvers: Round-House cutback, backside snap

Tunc Ucyildiz (born April 22, 1978, in Ankara, Turkey) is a Turkish surfer who has won Turkey's first national surfing title in October 2012. He is known for his efforts to jump start surfing activities and competitive surfing in Turkey. With the help of his friends and associates he has managed I.S.A (International Surfing Association) to officially declare Turkey as its 72. member nation.

In May 2013, Tunc Ucyildiz along with Onat Ersoy, became the first Turkish surfers to represent Turkey in I.S.A World Surfing Games where national teams compete.
