= Mehmet Burak Erdoğan =

Turkish mathematician

Mehmet Burak Erdoğan (born 1972) is a Turkish mathematician, scientist, and professor of mathematics. He is a member of the University of Illinois Urbana-Champaign (UIUC) Mathematics Department.

== Education ==
Burak Erdoğan was born in 1972. He attended the high school Kayseri Fen Lisesi in Kayseri, Turkey, for two years before moving to İzmir, Turkey where he finished the high school Atatürk Lisesi in 1989. He ranked third in the country-wide university entrance exams. He graduated from Bilkent University Electrical and Electronics Engineering in Ankara in 1994. He finished his MSc degree in Mathematics department of the same university under the supervision of Iossif Vladimirovich Ostrovskii in 1996. He received his PhD in Mathematics under the supervision of Thomas Wolff at Caltech in 2001. He was the last PhD student of Wolff, who died in the last year of Erdoğan's PhD work.

== Academic career ==
He was a postdoc at the Institute for Advanced Study between 2001-2002 and a visiting assistant professor at University of California, Berkeley between 2002-2004. Since then he is a faculty member in UIUC Mathematics Department.

He has been an active researcher, having published more than 50 scientific manuscripts with more than 800 citations. He raised 6 PhD students.

== Research areas ==
His research interests include harmonic analysis and dispersive partial differential equations.

=== Representative scientific publications ===
- Erdoğan, M.Burak; Tzirakis, Nikolaos (2016). Dispersive partial differential equations, wellposedness and applications. London Mathematical Society Student Texts. Vol. 86. Cambridge University Press. ISBN 978-1-316-60293-5.
- Erdog̃an, M. Burak (2005). "A bilinear Fourier extension theorem and applications to the distance set problem". International Mathematics Research Notices. 2005 (23): 1411–1425. doi:10.1155/IMRN.2005.1411.
- Chapman, Jeremy; Erdoğan, M. Burak; Hart, Derrick; Iosevich, Alex; Koh, Doowon (2012). "Pinned distance sets, k-simplices, Wolff's exponent in finite fields and sum-product estimates". Mathematische Zeitschrift. 271 (1–2): 63–93. arXiv:0903.4218. doi:10.1007/s00209-011-0852-4. S2CID 253711074.
- Erdoğan, M.Burak; Tzirakis, Nikolaos (2013). "Global smoothing for the periodic KdV evolution". International Mathematics Research Notices. 2013 (20): 4589–4614. arXiv:1103.4190. doi:10.1093/imrn/rns189.
- Erdoğan, M.Burak; Goldberg, Michael; Schlag, Wilhelm (2008). "Strichartz and smoothing estimates for Schrödinger operators with large magnetic potentials in $\mathbb{R}^3$". Journal of the European Mathematical Society. 10 (2): 507–531. arXiv:math/0608699. doi:10.4171/JEMS/120.
- Erdoğan, M.Burak; Green, William (2022). "The $L^p$ continuity of wave operators for higher order Schrodinger operators". Advances in Mathematics. 404, Part B 108450. arXiv:2107.09620. doi:10.1016/j.aim.2022.108450. S2CID 237057129.
