= Kaan Tangöze =

Turkish musician (born 1973)

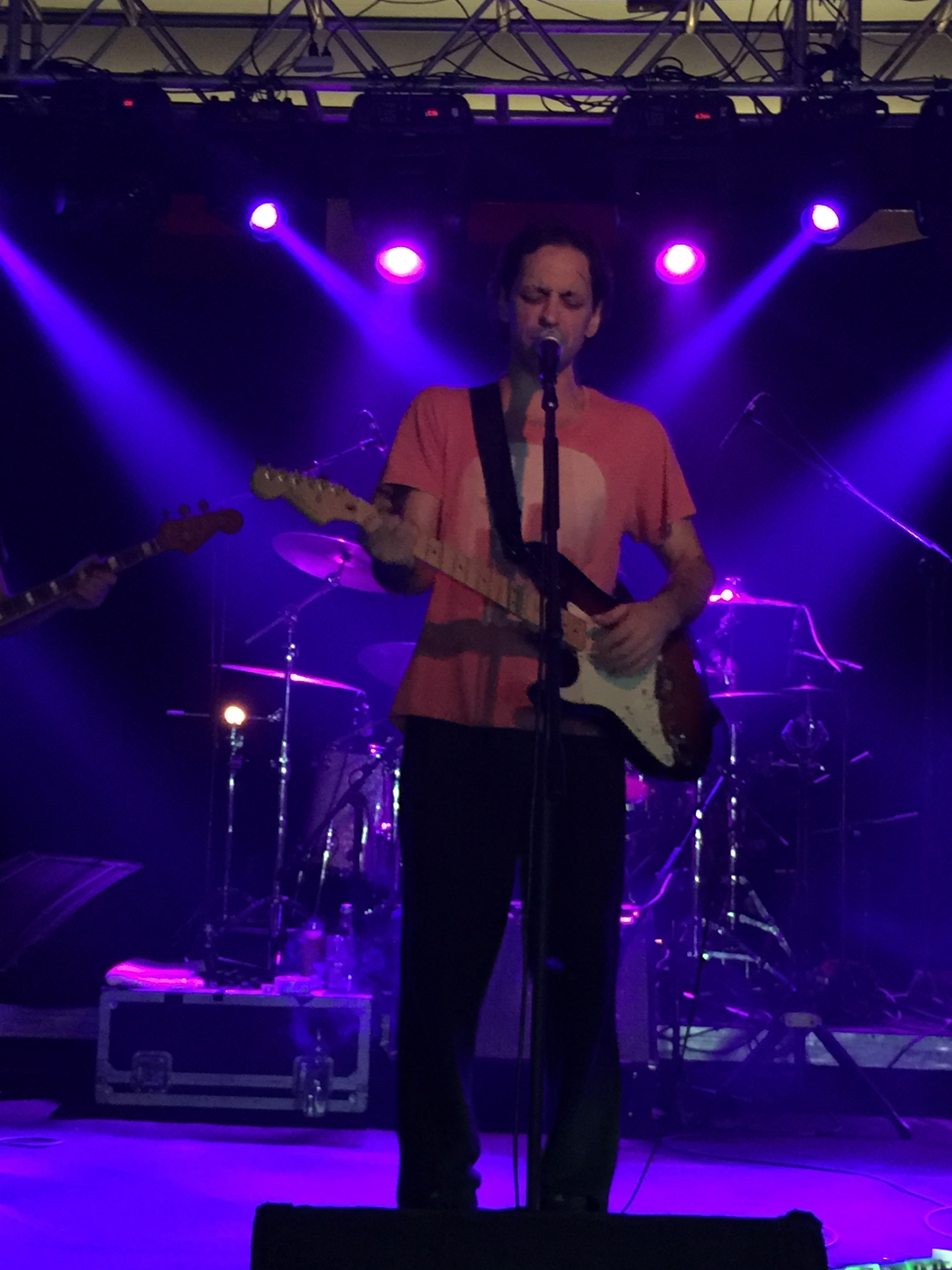
- Kaan Tangöze in Diyarbakır, 2015.

Background information
- Born: Rıza Kaan Tangöze; September 5, 1973 (age 52); Istanbul, Turkey
- Genres: alternative rock; grunge; protest; anatolian rock
- Occupations: singer; songwriter; guitarist
- Instruments: electric guitar; acoustic guitar; harmonica
- Years active: 1999–present
- Website: http://dumanlive.com

Kaan Tangöze (born September 5, 1973) is a Turkish musician. He is the left-handed lead vocalist and guitarist of the Turkish rock band Duman. He graduated from Bilkent University, Department of Tourism and Hotel Management. He has a master's degree in economics from Seattle University in the United States.

== Music career ==
During his education in the United States, he made music with Yakup Trana. The song he wrote in Seattle called "Lalala" was published in two collection albums in the United States. Before Duman was established, Kaan Tangöze and Ari Barokas were in a grunge/cover band called Mad Madame.

In 1999, Duman was founded by Kaan Tangöze as lead vocalist, Batuhan Mutlugil as guitarist and back vocalist, and Ari Barokas as bass guitarist. In January 2006 he published a single called "Karanlıkta" with Batuhan Mutlugil and Yakup Trana. Duman has released 7 studio albums since 1999 and Kaan Tangöze started his solo career with his album Gölge Etme in 2015.

Duman composed a song titled "Eyvallah" for their album Darmaduman (2013) and Kaan Tangöze composed a song called "Taksim Meydanı" in his solo album Gölge Etme (2015) following May 2013 Taksim Gezi Park protests.

== Personal life ==
On October 22, 2002 his girlfriend, model Ahu Paşakay, committed suicide.

He married model Seçkin Piriler on March 24, 2010, and they have two sons: Hakan and Volkan. The couple divorced on March 11, 2016.

He married Kıvılcım Ural on November 24, 2018.

== Discography ==
- Eski Köprünün Altında (1999)
- Belki Alışman Lazım (2002)
- Seni Kendime Sakladım (2005)
- Duman I (2009)
- Duman II (2009)
- Darmaduman (2013)
- Gölge Etme (2015)
- Kufi (2024)
