= Duman (band) =

Turkish rock band

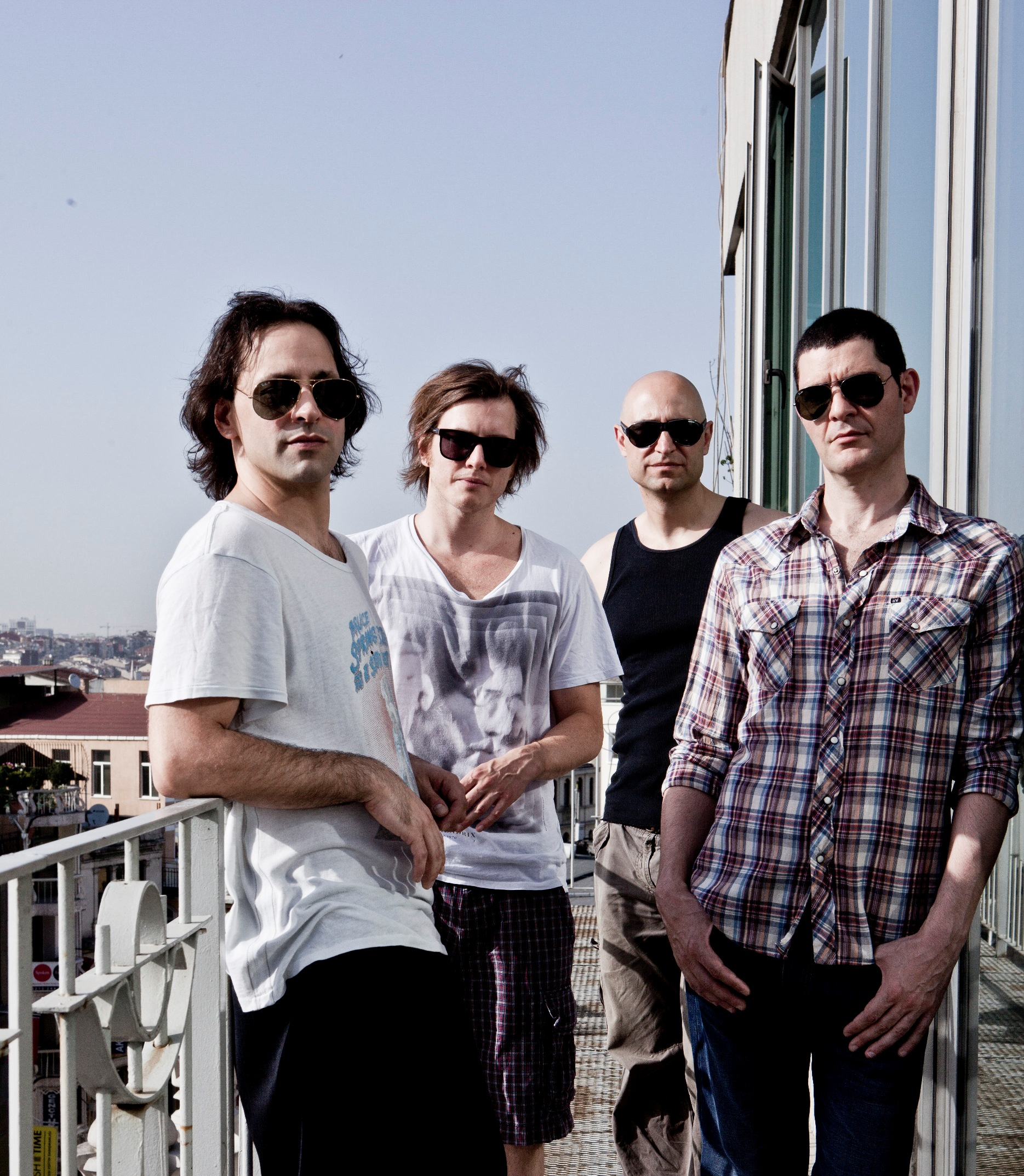

Background information
- Origin: Istanbul, Turkey
- Genres: Alternative rock, grunge, anatolian rock
- Years active: 1999–present
- Labels: NR1 Music, EMI, Sony BMG Music
- Members: Kaan Tangöze; Batuhan Mutlugil; Ari Barokas; Doğaç Titiz
- Past members: Alen Konakoğlu; Cengiz Baysal; Mehmet Demirdelen
- Website: www.dumanlive.com

Duman (English: Smoke) is a Turkish rock band. Founded in 1999, the band features Kaan Tangöze on vocals and guitar, Ari Barokas on bass guitar and backing vocals, Batuhan Mutlugil on lead guitar and backing vocals and Doğaç Titiz on drums. The band's music combines elements of traditional Turkish folk music with modern rock and grunge.

Frontman Tangoze and bassist Barokas used to play together in a band named Mad Madame while they were both living on the West Coast of the United States. When they returned to Turkey, they recruited Mutlugil and formed their new band in 1999.

Duman, consisting of Kaan Tangöze on vocals and guitar, Batuhan Mutlugil on guitar and backing vocals, Ari Barokas on bass guitar and backing vocals, Alen Konakoğlu and Cengiz Baysal on drums, set out to release their first album; however, the band did not have a name yet. Therefore, the name of the band was inspired by the song ‘Hâlimiz Duman’ and became Duman.

== Discography ==
=== Studio albums ===
- Eski Köprünün Altında (1999)
- Belki Alışman Lazım (2002)
- Seni Kendime Sakladım (2005)
- Duman I & II (2009)
- Darmaduman (2013)
- Kufi (2024)
- Kufi Kafada (2025)

=== Compilation albums ===
- En Güzel Günüm Gecem 1999-2006 (2007)

=== Live albums ===
- Konser (2003)
- Bu Akşam Konser DVD (2004)
- Rock'N Coke Konseri (2008)
- Canlı (2011)

=== Music videos ===
- Köprüaltı (1999) - Eski Köprünün Altında
- Hayatı Yaşa (1999) - Eski Köprünün Altında
- Bebek (2000) - Eski Köprünün Altında
- Her Şeyi Yak (2002) - Belki Alışman Lazım
- Oje (2002) - Belki Alışman Lazım
- Bu Akşam (2003) - Belki Alışman Lazım
- Çile Bülbülüm [Konser] (2003) - Konser
- Olmadı Yar [Konser] (2003) - Konser
- Belki Alışman Lazım (2003) - Belki Alışman Lazım
- Seni Kendime Sakladım (2005) - Seni Kendime Sakladım
- Aman Aman (2006) - Seni Kendime Sakladım
- Karanlıkta (2006) - Yakup & Kaan & Batuhan - Karanlıkta
- En Güzel Günüm Gecem (2006) - Seni Kendime Sakladım
- Dibine Kadar (2009) - Duman I
- Senden Daha Güzel (2009) - Duman II
- Elleri Ellerime (2010) - Duman II
- Sor Bana Pişman Mıyım (2011) - Duman I
- Helal Olsun (2011) - Canlı
- İyi De Bana Ne (Akustik) (2012) - Canlı
- Yürek (2013) - Darmaduman
- Melankoli (2014) - Darmaduman
- Öyle Dertli (2015) - Darmaduman

=== Duet albums ===
- İstanbul Hatırası: Köprüyü Geçmek (2005) - Doublemoon
- Yakup & Kaan & Batuhan - Karanlıkta (2006) - EMI
- Sınav Soundtrack (2006) - Sony BMG
- Bulutsuzluk Özlemi 20 Yaşında (2007) - DMC
- İstanbul Sensin (2010) - Sony BMG
- Orhan Gencebay ile Bir Ömür (2012) - Poll Production
