= Hande Dalkılıç =

Turkish pianist

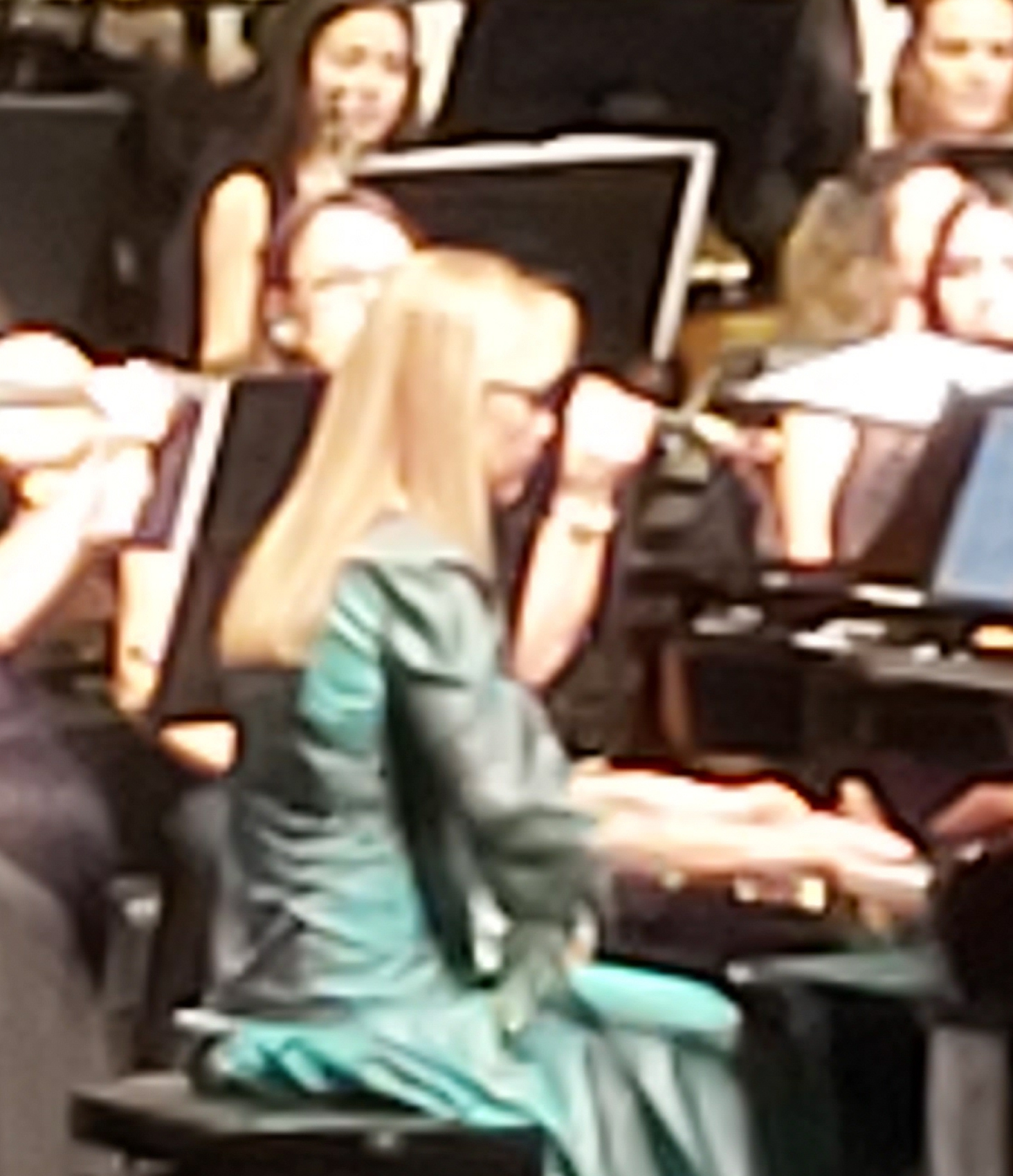

Hande Dalkılıç (born March 22, 1974, Ankara, Turkey) is a Turkish concert pianist.

== Biography ==
Dalkılıç started her piano lessons with Prof. Güherdal Karamanoğlu Çakırsoy. She enrolled in the Bilkent University Faculty of Music and Performing Arts in 1989 and studied under Prof. Ersin Onay. She graduated from the Music Department in 1996 with first rank in the Faculty of Music and Performing Arts. She completed her master's degree in 1999 and Proficiency in Art degree in 2003. She has gained acclaim for her research nourished by her high artistic sensitivity starting from the earliest stages of her professional work. Her sister is Yasemin Dalkılıç, who is a world record-setting free-diver.
