= Emre Elivar =

Turkish concert pianist

Emre Elivar (born 21 August 1976, in Ankara) is a Turkish concert pianist.

Emre Elivar began his studies and graduated from State Conservatoire in Ankara. The DAAD scholarship made his further education and specialization at music academies “Carl Maria von Weber“ Dresden and “Hanns Eisler“ Berlin possible, at latter he obtained his master's degree and title “Konzertpianist”.

During his studies and early career Emre Elivar won several international music prizes like the triple awards in Bremen in 1999, the bronze medal at “Cidado do Porto” in 1999 and at “World Piano Competition” in Cincinnati in 2000, Steinway-Prize in 2001, Artur Schnabel Prize in 2002 and Vendôme-Prize in 2003.

Along with his Bremer recording of the French Suite No. 3 BWV 817 by J. S. Bach and the Concerto No. 1 by F. Liszt, the artist also recorded important works of several Turkish composers and recently as a double album the Three Last Sonatas opp. 109, 110, 111 and the Diabelli - Variations, op. 120 by L. v. Beethoven. His new CD recently released by Sony BMG with works by F. Schubert (Three Piano Pieces D 946) and R. Schumann (Symphonic Etudes op. 13) earned great reviews internationally. The highlight for the season 2009/2010 was definitely his concert in June 2010, totally dedicated to R. Schumann containing both his sonatas, broadcast live to honor Schumann's 200th birthday by 50 members of EBU (European Broadcast Union).

Emre Elivar has been living in Bursa and working at Uludağ University State Conservatory since 2019.
