= İhsan Doğramacı =

Turkish pediatrician and medical academic (1915–2010)

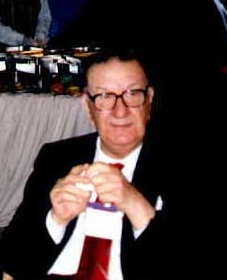
- İhsan Doğramacı, 1996

Chairman of UNICEF
- In office 1968–1970
- Preceded by: Joseph W. Willard
- Succeeded by: Nils Thedin

Personal details
- Born: 3 April 1915 Erbil, Mosul Vilayet, Ottoman Empire (modern Iraq)
- Died: 25 February 2010 (aged 94) Ankara, Turkey
- Spouse: Ayser Süleyman
- Children: Ali Doğramacı (son) and 2 others
- Parent: Doğramacızade Ali Pasha (Father)
- Education: International College, Beirut
- Alma mater: Istanbul University
- Occupation: Entrepreneur; educationalist; philanthropist; paediatrician

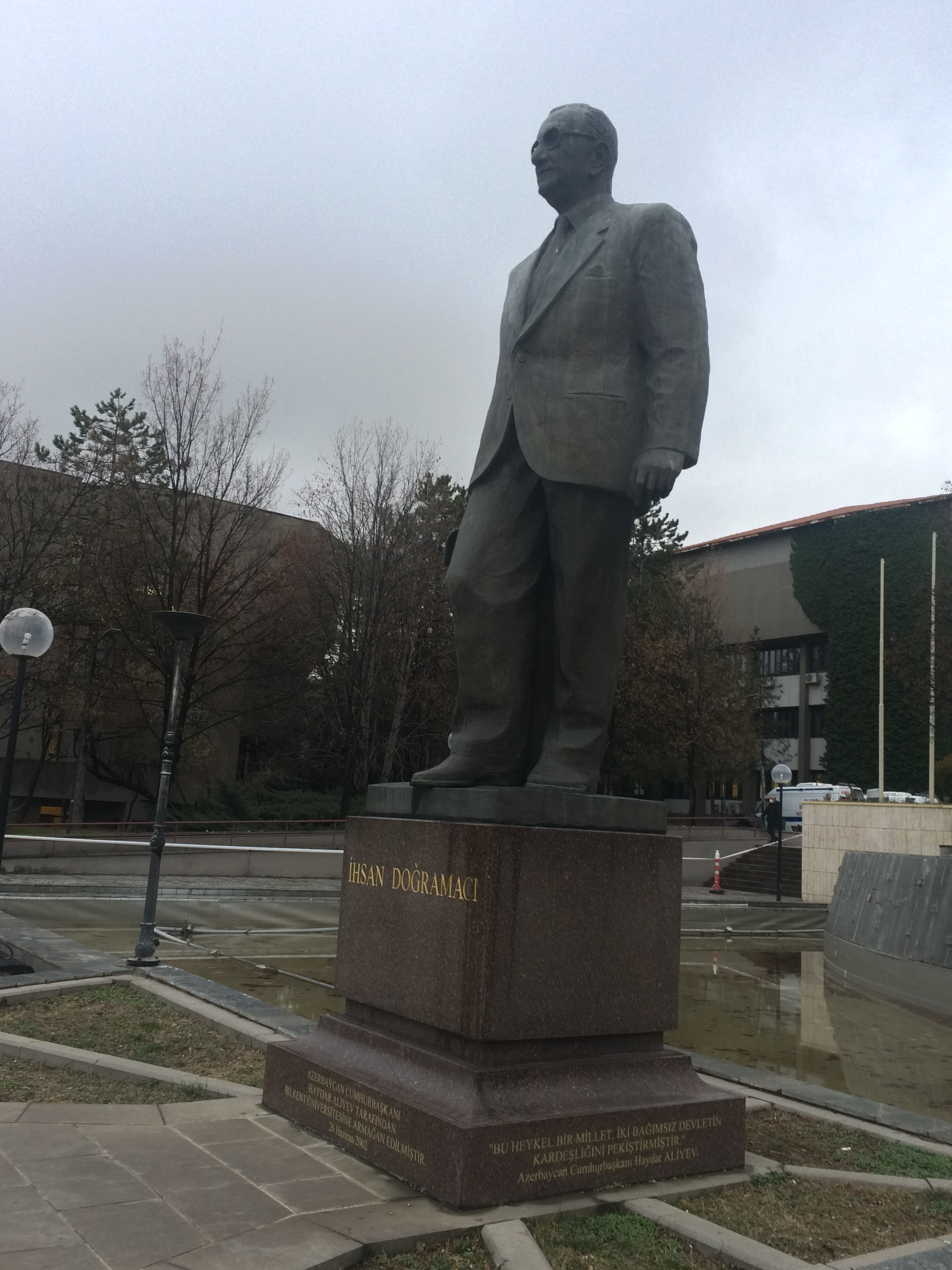
İhsan Doğramacı statue at Bilkent University

İhsan Doğramacı (3 April 1915 – 25 February 2010) was a Turkish paediatrician, entrepreneur, philanthropist, educationalist and college administrator of Iraqi Turkmen descent born in Erbil, Ottoman Empire (now Iraq).

Doğramacı was a pediatric physician and an international leader of development. He was the founder of Bilkent University, a leading private university and Hacettepe University, one of the overall highly ranked universities in Turkey which specializes in medical sciences in Ankara, Turkey, chairman of the board of trustees of Middle East Technical University in 1965, chairman of the UNICEF executive board, founding president of the Council of Higher Education of Turkey, executive director and president of the International Pediatric Association (IPA), co-ratifier of WHO's constitution. He was the first president and the chairman of the board of trustees of WHO since 1985.

He was offered national political leadership positions such as ministry of foreign affairs and premiership by Cemal Gürsel and Süleyman Demirel, both of which he declined.

Doğramacı spoke Turkish, English, French, German, Arabic and Persian. He authored over 100 scientific articles, three books, and six book chapters, and served as the editor of four medical journals.

== Career in international organisations ==
He was a Fellow of the Royal College of Paediatrics and Child Health in London and has been an Honorary Scientific Advisor to the International Centre for Childhood Studies in England since 1982.

Doğramacı was a member of the Board of Trustees of Heart International in 1981. He was the president of IPA, UNICEF, WHO, FIGO and UNFPA Task Force (1997–1998). He was a member of the Board (1970–1984) of the International Children's Centre in Paris, and he had been a member of the Board of Regents of the International Association for Humanitarian Medicine since 2000.

İhsan Doğramacı co-founded the Assembly of the Parliament of Cultures with Prince Hassan of Jordan and joined members from many nations in Ankara in 2004. The purpose of the Foundation is to promote and strengthen international and intercultural understanding among different cultures in the world and to enhance dialogue between their thinkers and intellectuals by means of peaceful dialogue.

=== International Pediatric Association (IPA) ===
He was the honorary president of the International Pediatric Association (IPA) since 1992. He was the president of IPA between 1968 and 1977, and its executive director between 1977 and 1993.

=== World Health Organization (WHO) ===
He signed the WHO Constitution in New York City, July 1946. He was the vice president in 1976 and a member of the executive board between 1976 and 1982. He had been a member of many child health-related programs and groups in WHO. Since 1980, the World Health Organization has awarded the İhsan Doğramacı Family Health Foundation Prize biennially to pediatricians and child health specialists in recognition of their distinguished contributions to family health.

=== UNICEF ===
He had been a member of the UNICEF Executive Board (1959–1985), and he was elected as chairman of the board for two terms. He had been the president of the Turkish National Committee for UNICEF (1958–2003). He was a major financial charitable contributor to the UNICEF co-sponsored Turkish educational community campaign "Let's Go to School, Girls".

== Career in Turkey ==
İhsan Doğramacı matured in the secular Turkey of Mustafa Kemal Atatürk. This was a political environment that Doğramacı endeavored to help develop, with his focus being medicine and child health. He also saw higher education as a parallel concern. He set out on the path to reform these fields, a path filled with obstacles of bureaucratic, legal and self-interested opposition by several circles. Sir Horace Phillips described him in his book: "This is a likable man, emphatic in manner, but gentle with it; sometimes intolerant of those who do not share his ideals. But he has not been spoiled by his achievements."

=== Administratorship ===
Doğramacı was the founding president of the Council of Higher Education of Turkey (YÖK) from 1981 until 1992. He chaired the board of trustees in Middle East Technical University in 1965 and held the rector position in Ankara University in 1963 and several other universities in Turkey.

=== Hacettepe University ===
After a rapid rise in academia, Doğramacı became a Professor of pediatrics in 1955. In the same year, Doğramacı founded The Child Health Department affiliated with Ankara University Medical School. In 1958 the Child Health Institute and Hospital started to serve the community as well as its researches and education. In 1961 School of Health Sciences was founded as the first instance of school healthcare science in Turkey. Subsequent to the establishment of some other departments such as dentistry, home economics the institute became another higher education center affiliated with Ankara University Medical School, and thus in 1967, the Hacettepe University was founded officially. After the establishment of some other departments under Hacettepe University, a need for a larger educational building complex aroused. İhsan Doğramacı endowed a considerable amount to foundations named Hacettepe Education Foundation and Hacettepe Health Foundation. Thanks to these donations the new campus for Hacettepe University was built rapidly. Presently, Hacettepe University is one of the best state universities in Turkey in medicine-related areas.

=== Bilkent University ===
After the legislation allowing the establishment of private universities in Turkey upon Doğramacı's request and effort, he began his searches to found a private, campus university. Afterward, in 1984 between Middle East Technical University and Hacettepe University campuses, the first private university of Turkey, Bilkent University was founded. Doğramacı founded some industrial companies such as Tepe construction to build educational buildings and to provide financial support for the university as well. All the companies incorporated under Bilkent Holding are now one of the major corporate groups of Turkey. All companies were endowed to the Bilkent University. Doğramacı's all heirs relinquished their rights to the companies. By this act, he donated nearly his whole fortune to the university. Bilkent University is one of the top universities in Turkey and, according to the Times Higher Education World University Rankings, is ranked 112th globally.

Affiliated with Bilkent University, Doğramacı had some other educational projects.The first of his university-level education centers of excellence, Bilkent Erzurum Laboratory High School, was inaugurated in 2007 in Erzurum. This was followed by three other centers in East and Southeast Turkey. Professor İhsan Doğramacı also provided charitable financial private scholarship support to university students in medical sciences and music for over 40 years.

The Turkish Foreign Policy Institute of Bilkent University administers an award program of İhsan Doğramacı Prize of International Relations for Peace.

Doğramacı, with his wife, Ayser Doğramacı, endowed their family wealth to the support of educational and medical projects. In more recent times the Founder had turned his attention to the place of his birth, Erbil. The vision of the İhsan Doğramacı Erbil Foundation was to build a needed and unique school in a region that has had a troubled history. After the completion of construction, the first students of İhsan Doğramacı Bilkent Erbil College began classes in 2010.

== Personal life ==
His father Doğramacızade Ali Pasha was the Mayor of Erbil and later a Senator in Baghdad; his grandfather Mehmet Ali Kırdar was a Member of the Ottoman Parliament for Kirkuk.

Doğramacı was married to Ayser Süleyman in 1942.

He had three children. His son, professor Ali Doğramacı, was the rector of Bilkent University until 1 March 2010. Currently his grandson-in-law, Prof. Dr. Abdullah Atalar, is the rector.

=== Death ===
İhsan Doğramacı died at Hacettepe University Hospital on 25 February 2010 from multiple organ failure. He had been receiving treatment in the intensive care unit there since November 2009.

== Awards, prizes, and decorations ==
=== Orders and decorations ===
- 1976 – Dominican Republic: Order of Merit of Duarte, Sánchez and Mella
- 1977 – France: National Order of the Legion of Honour
- 1979 – Finland: Order of the Lion of Finland
- 1989 – Poland: Order of Merit of the Republic of Poland
- 1989 – France: Médaille de la Ville de Paris
- 1990 – Dominican Republic: Grand Cross Order of Christopher Columbus
- 1995 – Turkey: State Medal of Distinguished Service
- 1997 – Romania: Medal for Merit
- 1997 – World Health Organization: Golden Medal Health For All
- 2000 – Azerbaijan: First Class of Istiglal Order
- 2000 – Estonia: Order of the Cross of Terra Mariana
- 2005 – Azerbaijan: Heydar Aliyev Order
- 2005 – Turkey: Golden Medal of Sevda-Cenap Music Foundation Honor Award
- 2009 – Iraq: Iraqi Ministry of Higher Education and Scientific Research, Commendation Medal
- 2009 – Egypt: Medal of Egyptian People's Assembly

=== Awards ===
- 1978 – Turkey: TÜBİTAK Service Award
- 1981 – World Health Organization: Léon Bernard Foundation Prize
- 1986 – United States: Christopherson Award (American Academy of Pediatrics)
- 1995 – UNICEF: Maurice Pate Award
- 1995 – Greece: Soranus of Science and Friendship Award
- 1998 – Council of Europe: “ Peace, Justice and Tolerance" Prize
- 1999 – Turkey: Health and Education Award
- 2000 – Turkey: Distinguished Service Award (Ministry of Foreign Affairs of Turkey)
- 2004 – Japan: Dr. Ju Shichiro Naito International Child Health Award
- 2007 – Turkey: Honor Award of the Grand National Assembly of Turkey
- 2009 – Turkey: Award of Islamic Organization for Medical Sciences
