= Yasemin Dalkılıç =

Turkish freediver and record holder

- Born: 2 May 1979 (age 47); Ankara, Turkey
- Education: Middle East Technical University (BS)
- Occupation: Free-diver

Yasemin Dalkılıç (born 2 May 1979) is a Turkish female free diver who has broken 8 World Records in the sport of freediving. She was known to be the 5th female world champion in this sport and broke the first official world record after the Constant Ballast No Fins category was introduced to the sport with a dive to 40 meters. Her deepest record in constant ballast with fins is 68 meters, limited variable ballast is 106 meters and 120 meters in No Limits category.

== Biography ==
Yasemin Dalkılıç was born and grew up in Ankara, Turkey, some 270 km (170 mi) away from the nearest coast. At age 14, she was a member of the national monofin finswimming team, where she stayed for several years and set several Turkish records. By the time she was 16, she had established herself as the best freediver in her country. In 1996, she started as a student in the mathematics department at the Middle East Technical University in Ankara, where she became a member of the Subaqua Society.

In 1998 Dalkılıç competed in the Freediving World Cup in Sardinia, Italy, where she clinched the first place among the women. A year later, in 1999, Yasemin made an acquaintance that would change her life. International trainer Rudi Castineyra, who would guide world champions Alejandro Ravelo, Tanya Streeter and David Lee to several world records, showed great interest in her.

Yasemin started a training regime designed by Rudi Castineyra. Under his guidance she set her first world record with a dive to 68 m (223 ft). In 2000 the duo set their sights on variable ballast freediving, which comprises two categories. On 19 and 23 July Dalkılıç beat the existing world records in the limited and unlimited variable ballast categories by reaching 100 m (330 ft) and 120 m (390 ft) respectively.

In 2001, she set two more world records. First improving her own mark in the limited variable ballast with a 105 m (344 ft) dive in Egypt and three months later, a second one in the unassisted constant ballast category, with a dive to 40 m (130 ft) in Kaş, Antalya Province, Turkey.

== Records ==
- Unassisted Constant Ballast 40 m, 1:56 min WR on 22 October 2001 in Kardamena, on the island of Kaş, Antalya, Turkey
- Limited Variable Ballast 105 m, 2:38 min WR on 15 July 2001 in Hurghada by the Island of Abu Ramada in the Red Sea, Egypt
- Unlimited Variable Ballast 120 m WR on 23 July 2000 in Bodrum, Turkey
- Limited Variable Ballast 100 m 2:22 min WR on 19 July 2000 in Bodrum
- Limited Variable Ballast 96 m 2:22 min WR on 14 July 2000 in Bodrum
- Equipment Assisted Constant Ballast 68 m 2:27 min WR on 7 November 1999

== See also ==
- Turkish women in sports
