= Ankara =

Capital of Turkey

- Capital city and metropolitan municipality
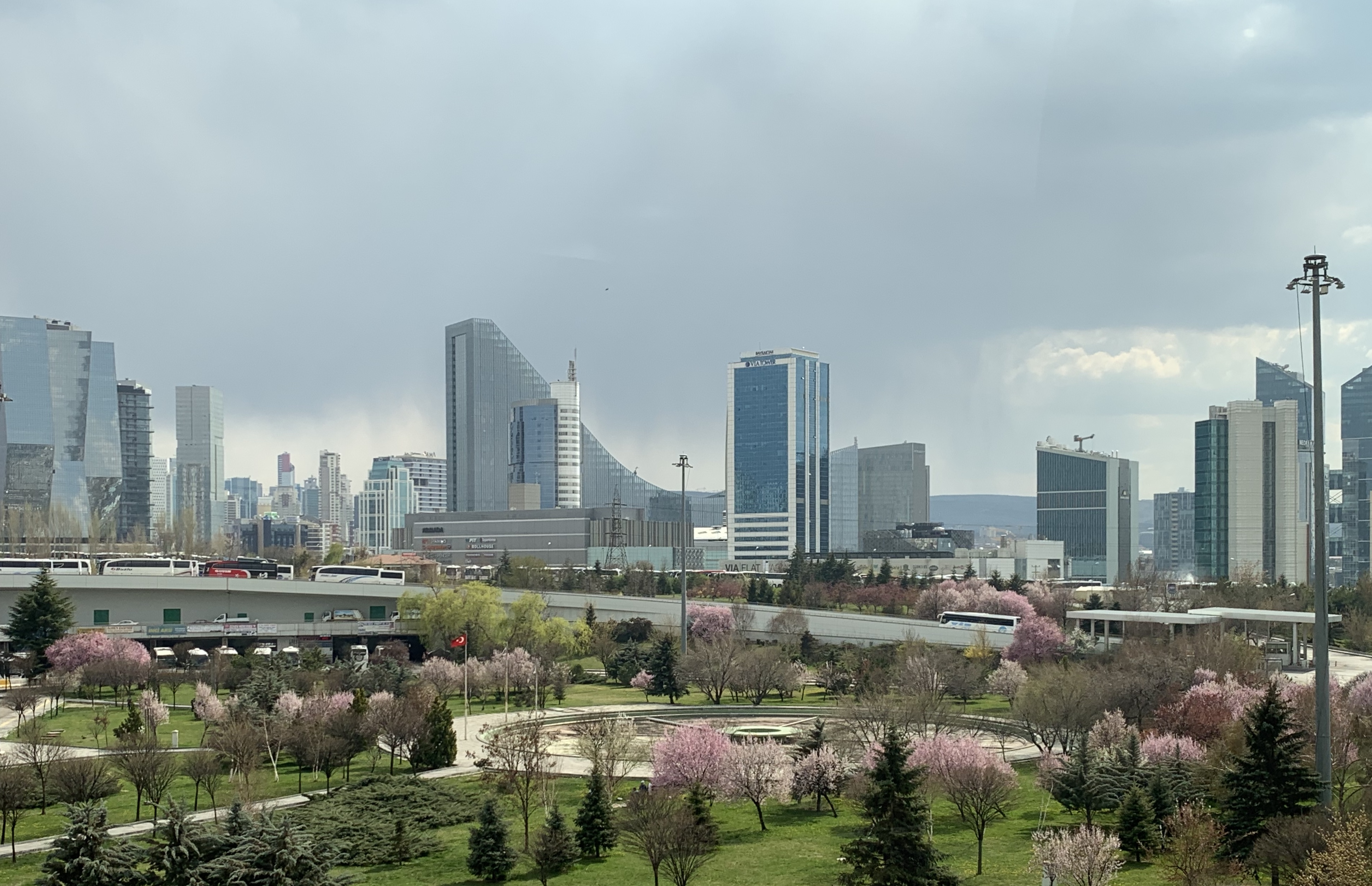
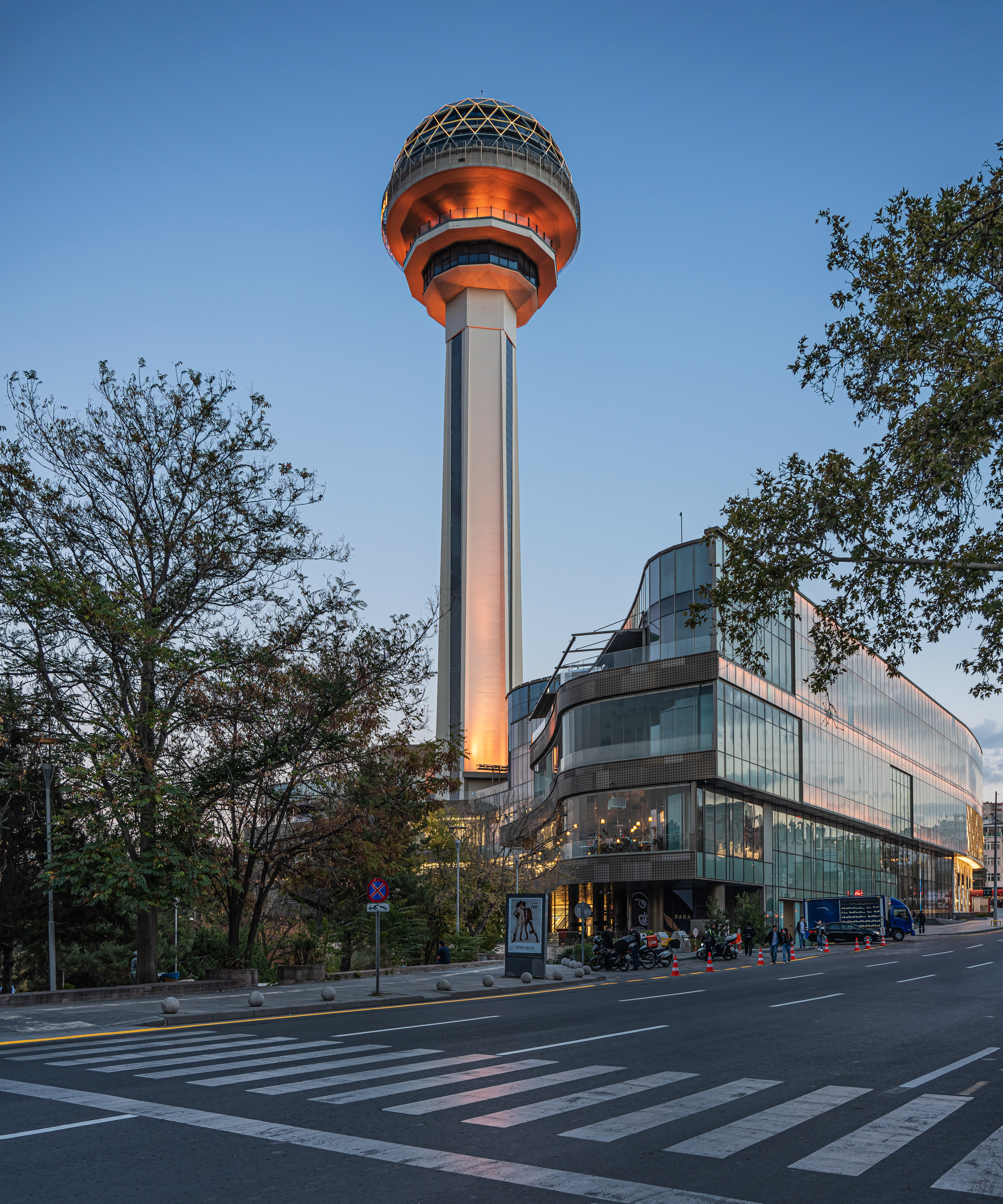
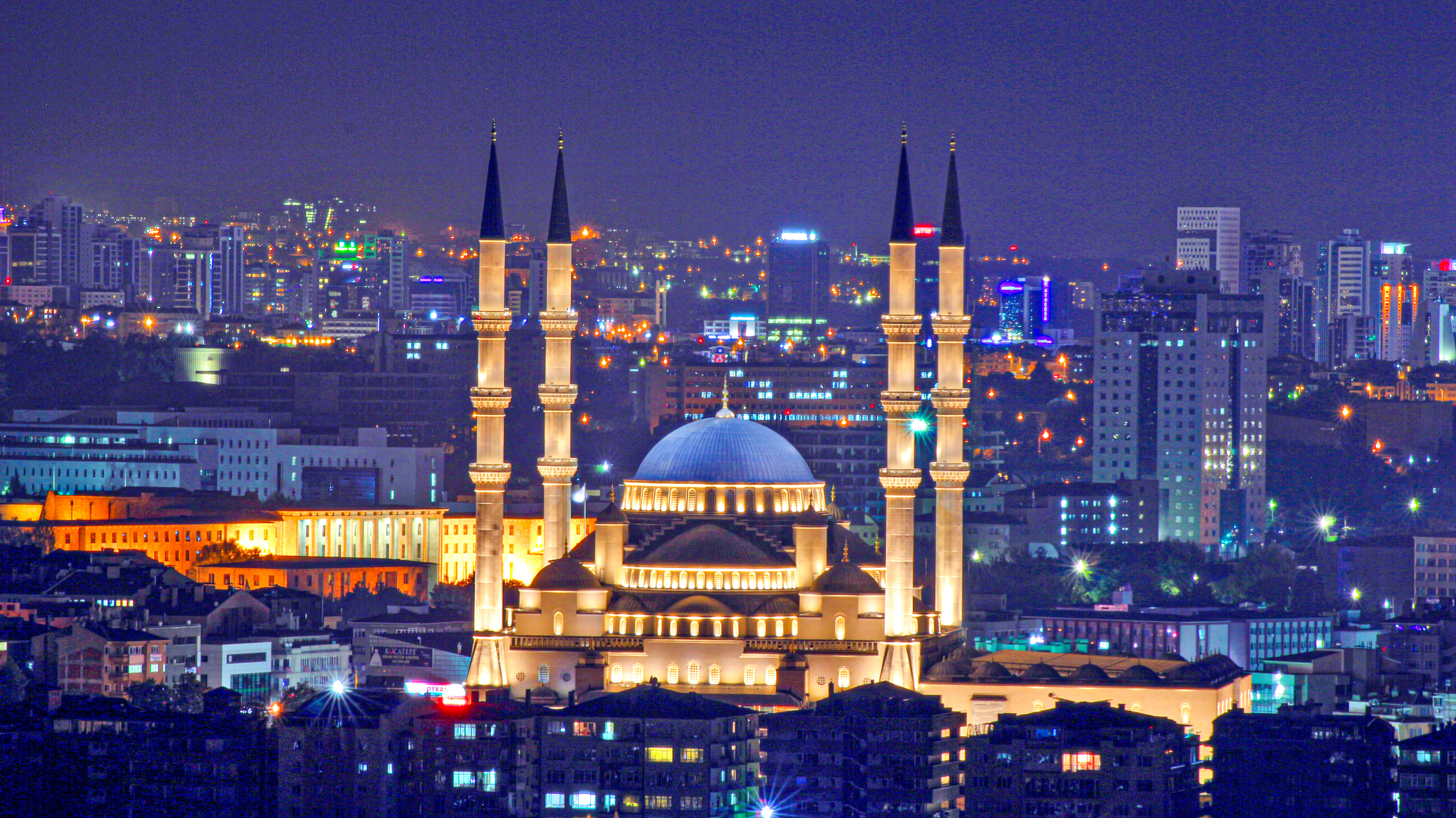
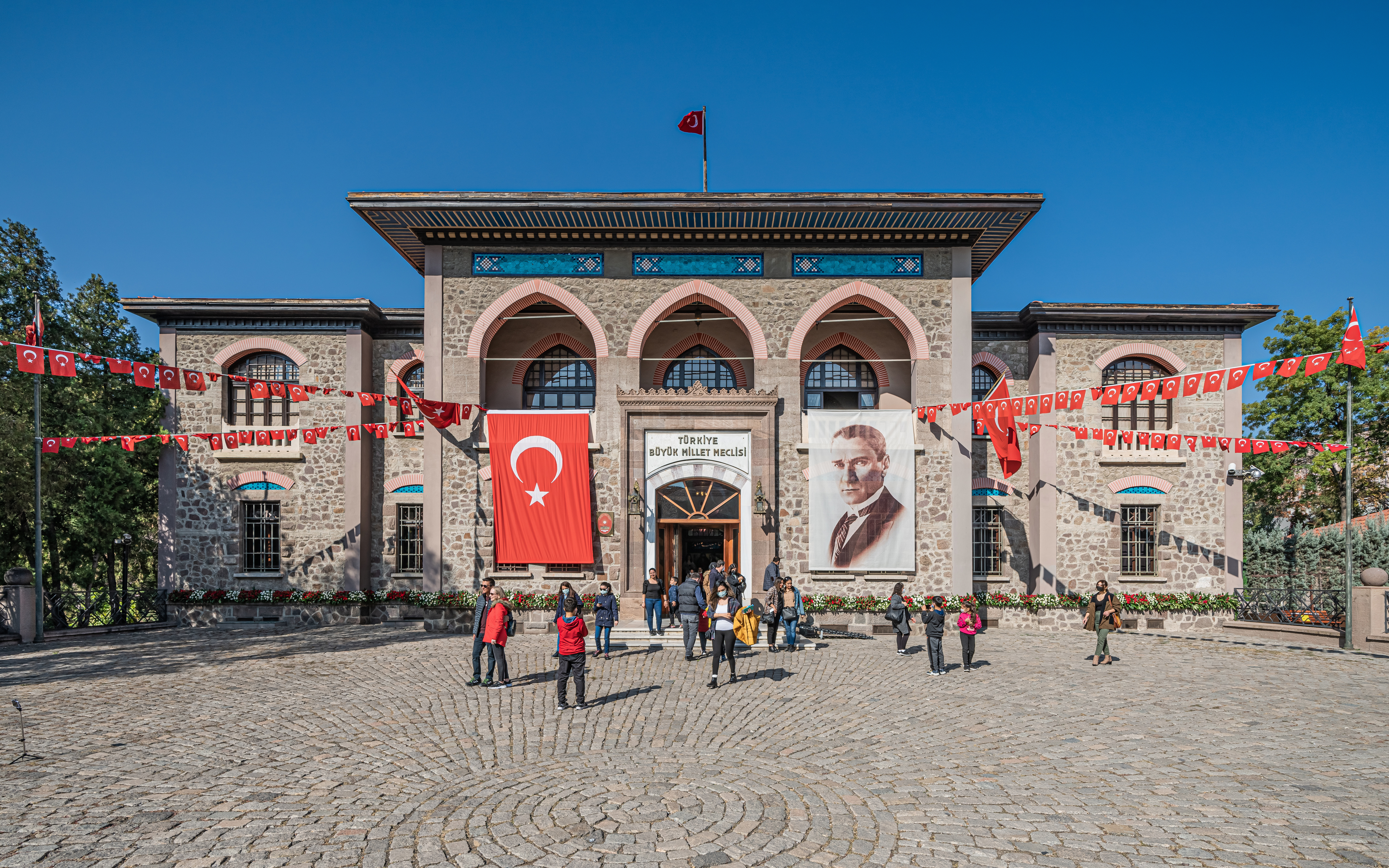
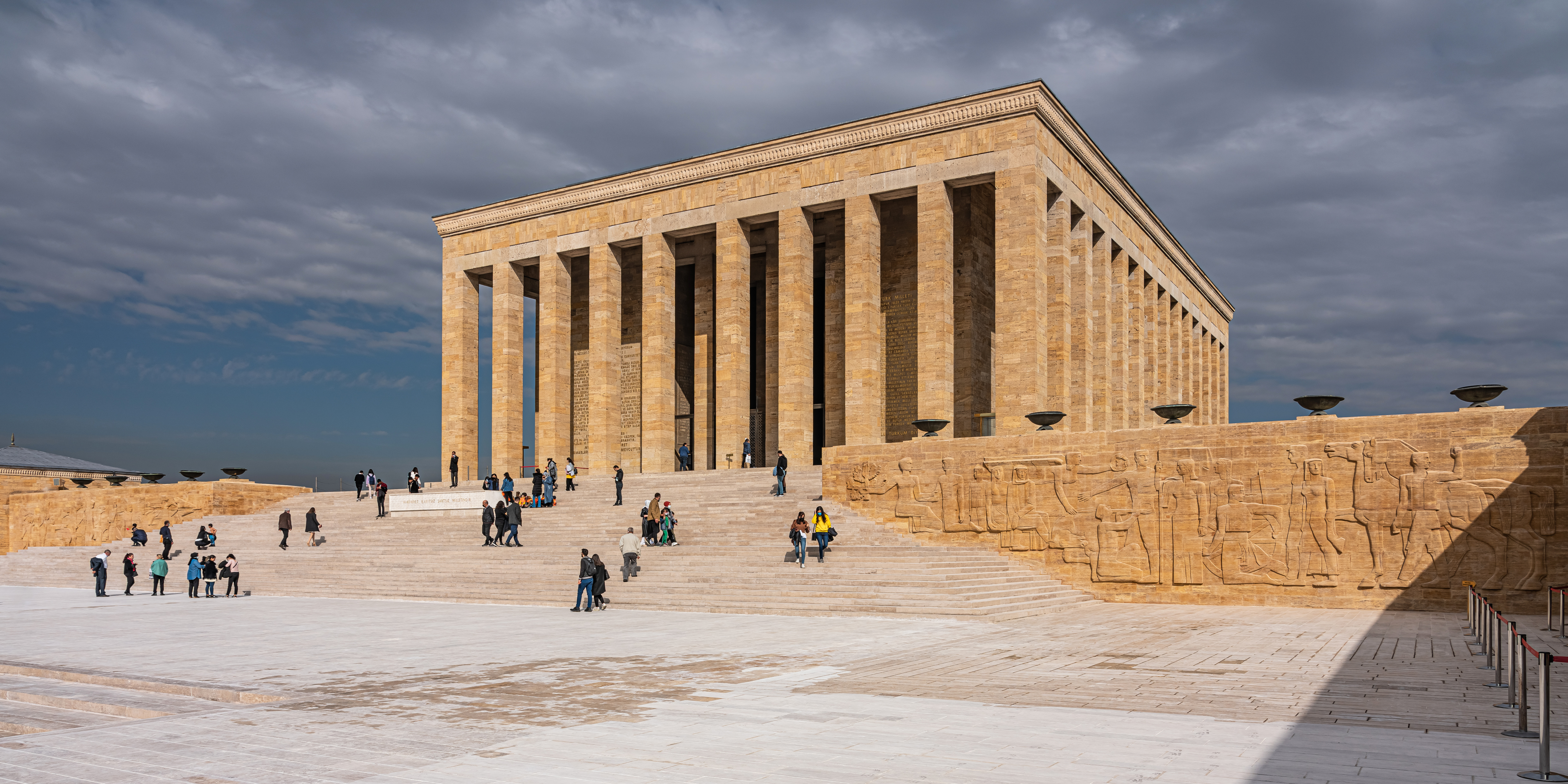
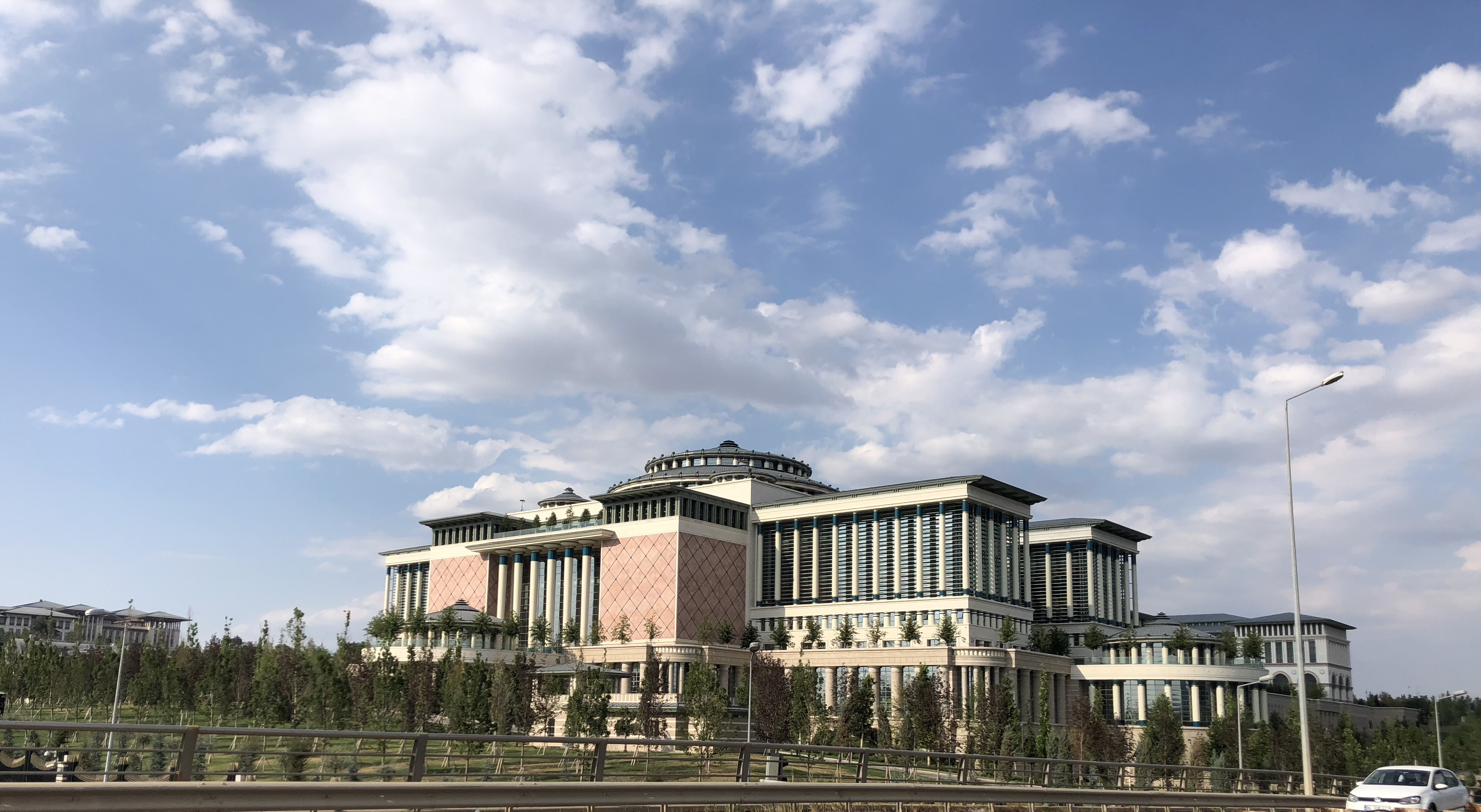
- Söğütözü business district Atakule Kocatepe Mosque Republic Museum Anıtkabir Nation's Library
- Nickname: Heart of Turkey (Turkish: Türkiye'nin Kalbi)
- Location within Turkey Ankara (Asia)
- Coordinates: 39°55′44″N 32°51′17″E
- Country: Turkey
- Region: Central Anatolia
- Province: Ankara
- Districts: 25

Government
  - Type: Mayor–council government
  - Body: Ankara Metropolitan Municipality Council
  - Mayor: Mansur Yavaş (Ind.)
  - Governor: Yakup Canbolat

Area (Note: Ankara Province / Metropolitan municipality [25,632 km² (including lake) / 24,521 km² (excluding lake) according to the Turkish Statistical Institute – TÜİK], is a province (il) of Turkey which has 25 districts (ilçe) and 9 of these districts form the urban area of Ankara city (4,130.2 km² including lake). Altındağ = 158.2 km² Çankaya = 454.2 km² Etimesgut = 283.2 km² Gölbaşı = 1,508.6 km² (a small area is part of the city proper) Keçiören = 152.2 km² Mamak = 345.7 km² Pursaklar = 133.7 km² Sincan = 862.3 km² Yenimahalle = 232.1 km²)
  - Urban: 4,130.2 km^{2} (1,594.7 sq mi)
  - Metro: 25,632 km^{2} (9,897 sq mi)
- Elevation: 938 m (3,077 ft)

Population (31 December 2025)
  - Capital city and metropolitan municipality: 5,910,320
  - Rank: 2nd in Turkey
  - Urban: 5,293,367
  - Urban density: 1,282/km^{2} (3,320/sq mi)
- Demonym(s): Ankaran (Turkish: Ankaralı)

GDP (nominal, 2024)
  - Capital city and metropolitan municipality: ₺4.673 trillion (US$142.3 billion)
  - Per capita: ₺788,859 (US$24,031)
- Time zone: UTC+03:00 (TRT)
- Postal code: 06xxx
- Area code: +90 312
- Vehicle registration: 06
- Website: www.ankara.bel.tr www.ankara.gov.tr

Ankara (Note: /ˈæŋkərə/ ANG-kər-ə, US also /ˈɑːŋ-/ AHNG-kər-ə; Turkish: [ˈɑŋkɑɾɑ]) is the capital city of Turkey. Located in the central part of Anatolia, the city has a population of over 5.3 million residents in its urban center, (Note: Resident population of (Etimesgut, Yenimahalle, Çankaya, Keçiören, Altındağ, Pursaklar, Mamak, Gölbaşı, Sincan) and Syrian refugees) out of 6 million residents in Ankara Province. (Note: all of 25 districts and Syrian refugees) Ankara is Turkey's second-largest city by population after Istanbul.

Ankara was historically known as Ancyra (Note: /ænˈsaɪrə/ an-SY-rə) and Angora. (Note: /æŋˈɡɔːrə/ ang-GOR-ə, US also /ˈæŋɡərə/ ANG-gə-rə,) Serving as the capital of the ancient Celtic state of Galatia (280–64 BC), and later of the Roman province with the same name (25 BC–7th century), Ankara has various Hattian, Hittite, Lydian, Phrygian, Galatian, Greek, Persian, Roman, Byzantine, and Ottoman archaeological sites. The Ottomans made the city the capital of the Anatolia Eyalet (1393 – late 15th century), the Angora Eyalet (1827–1864), and the Angora Vilayet (1867–1922). On 23 April 1920, the Grand National Assembly of Turkey was established in Ankara, which became the headquarters of the Turkish National Movement during the Turkish War of Independence. Ankara became the new Turkish capital upon the establishment of the Republic on 29 October 1923, succeeding the former Ottoman capital Istanbul following the fall of the Ottoman Empire.

The historical center of Ankara is a rocky hill rising 150 m (500 ft) over the left bank of the Ankara River, a tributary of the Sakarya River. The hill remains crowned by the ruins of Ankara Castle. Few of its outworks have survived, but there are well-preserved examples of Roman and Ottoman architecture throughout the city.

The government is a prominent employer, but Ankara is also an important commercial and industrial city located at the center of Turkey's road and railway networks. The city gave its name to the Angora wool shorn from Angora rabbits, the long-haired Angora goat (the source of mohair), and the Angora cat. The area is also known for its pears, honey and Muscat grapes. Although situated in one of the driest regions of Turkey and surrounded mostly by steppe vegetation (except for the forested areas on the southern periphery), Ankara can be considered a green city in terms of green areas per inhabitant, at 72 square meters (775 square feet) per head. Home to numerous universities, Ankara is among the top 100 science and technology clusters in the world.

== Etymology ==
The orthography of the name Ankara has varied over the ages. It has been identified with the Hittite cult center Ankuwaš, although this remains a matter of debate. In classical antiquity and during the medieval period, the city was known as Ánkyra (Ἄγκυρα, lit. 'anchor') in Greek and Ancyra in Latin; the Galatian Celtic name was probably a similar variant. Following its annexation by the Seljuk Turks in 1073, the city became known in many European languages as Angora; it was also known in Ottoman Turkish as Engürü (انگورو). The form "Angora" is preserved in the names of breeds of many different kinds of animals, and in the names of several locations in the US (see Angora).

== History ==
The region's history can be traced back to the Bronze Age Hattic civilization, which was succeeded in the 2nd millennium BC by the Hittites, in the 10th century BC by the Phrygians, and later by the Lydians, Persians, Greeks, Galatians, Romans, Byzantines, and Turks (the Seljuk Sultanate of Rûm, the Ottoman Empire and finally republican Türkiye).

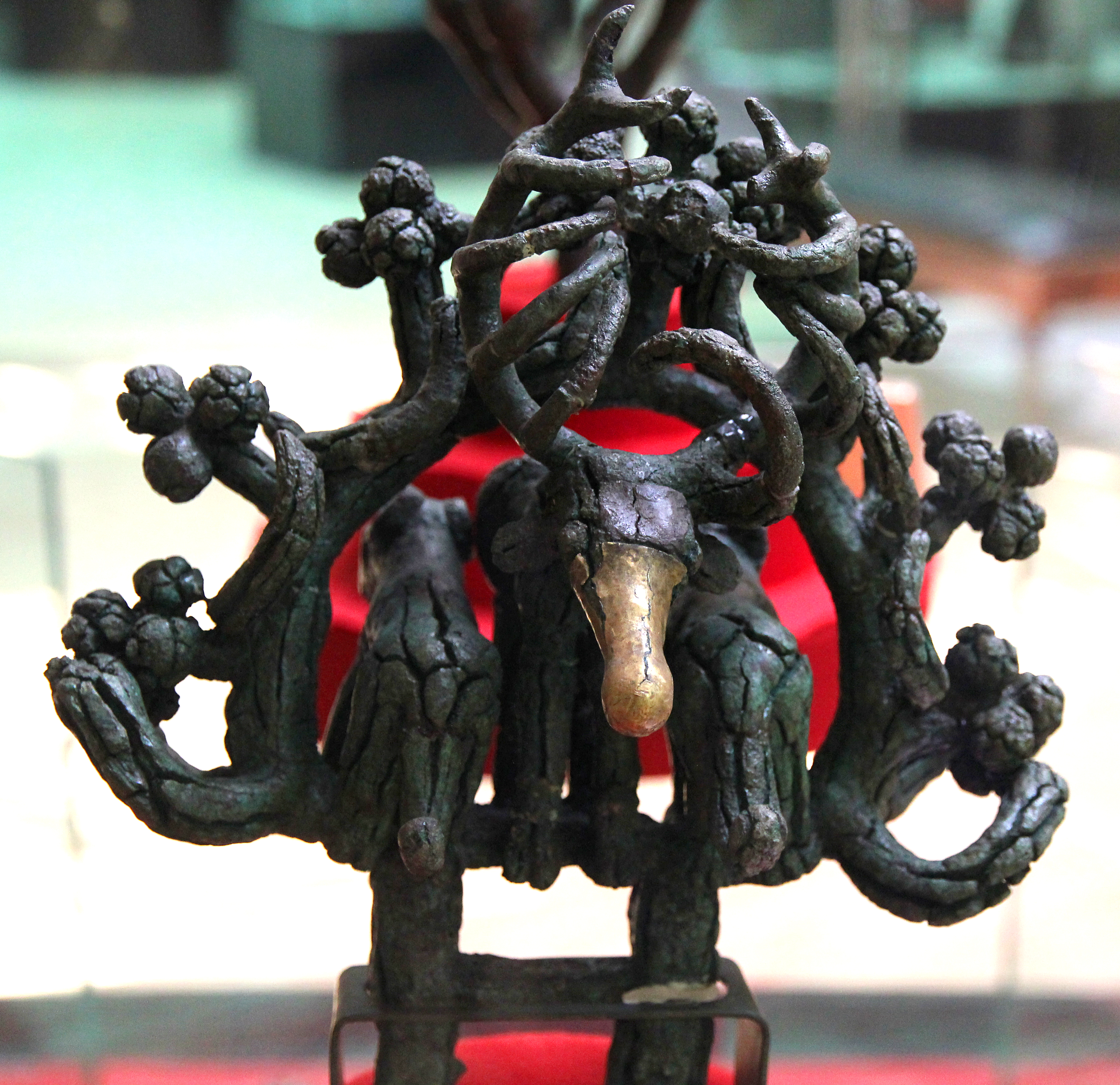

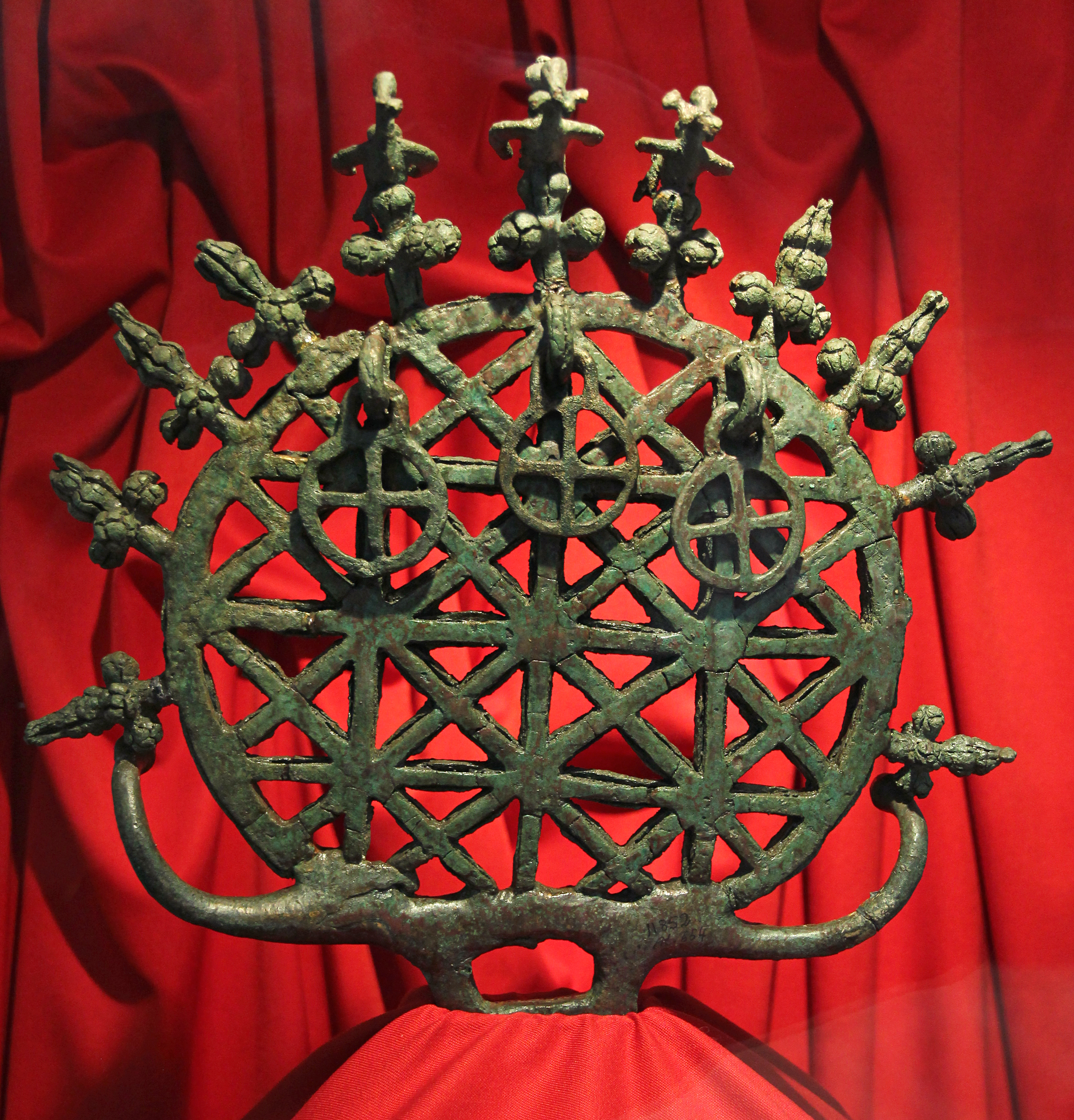
Alaca Höyük bronze standards on display at the Museum of Anatolian Civilizations, which is considered as the city's symbol.

=== Ancient history ===
The oldest settlements in and around the city center of Ankara belonged to the Hattic civilization which existed during the Bronze Age and was gradually absorbed c. 2000 – 1700 BC by the Indo-European Hittites. The city grew significantly in size and importance under the Phrygians starting around 1000 BC, and experienced a large expansion following the mass migration from Gordion, (the capital of Phrygia), after an earthquake which severely damaged that city around that time. In Phrygian tradition, King Midas was venerated as the founder of Ancyra, but Pausanias mentions that the city was actually far older, which accords with present archaeological knowledge.

Phrygian rule was succeeded first by Lydian and later by Persian rule, though the strongly Phrygian character of the peasantry remained, as evidenced by the gravestones of the much later Roman period. Persian sovereignty lasted until the Persians' defeat at the hands of Alexander the Great who conquered the city in 333 BC. Alexander came from Gordion to Ankara and stayed in the city for a short period. After his death at Babylon in 323 BC and the subsequent division of his empire among his generals, Ankara, and its environs fell into the share of Antigonus.

Another important expansion took place under the Greeks of Pontos who came there around 300 BC and developed the city as a trading center for the commerce of goods between the Black Sea ports and Crimea to the north; Assyria, Cyprus, and Lebanon to the south; and Georgia, Armenia and Persia to the east. By that time, the city also took its name Ἄγκυρα (Ánkyra, meaning anchor in Greek) which, in slightly modified form, provides the modern name of Ankara.

=== Celtic history ===
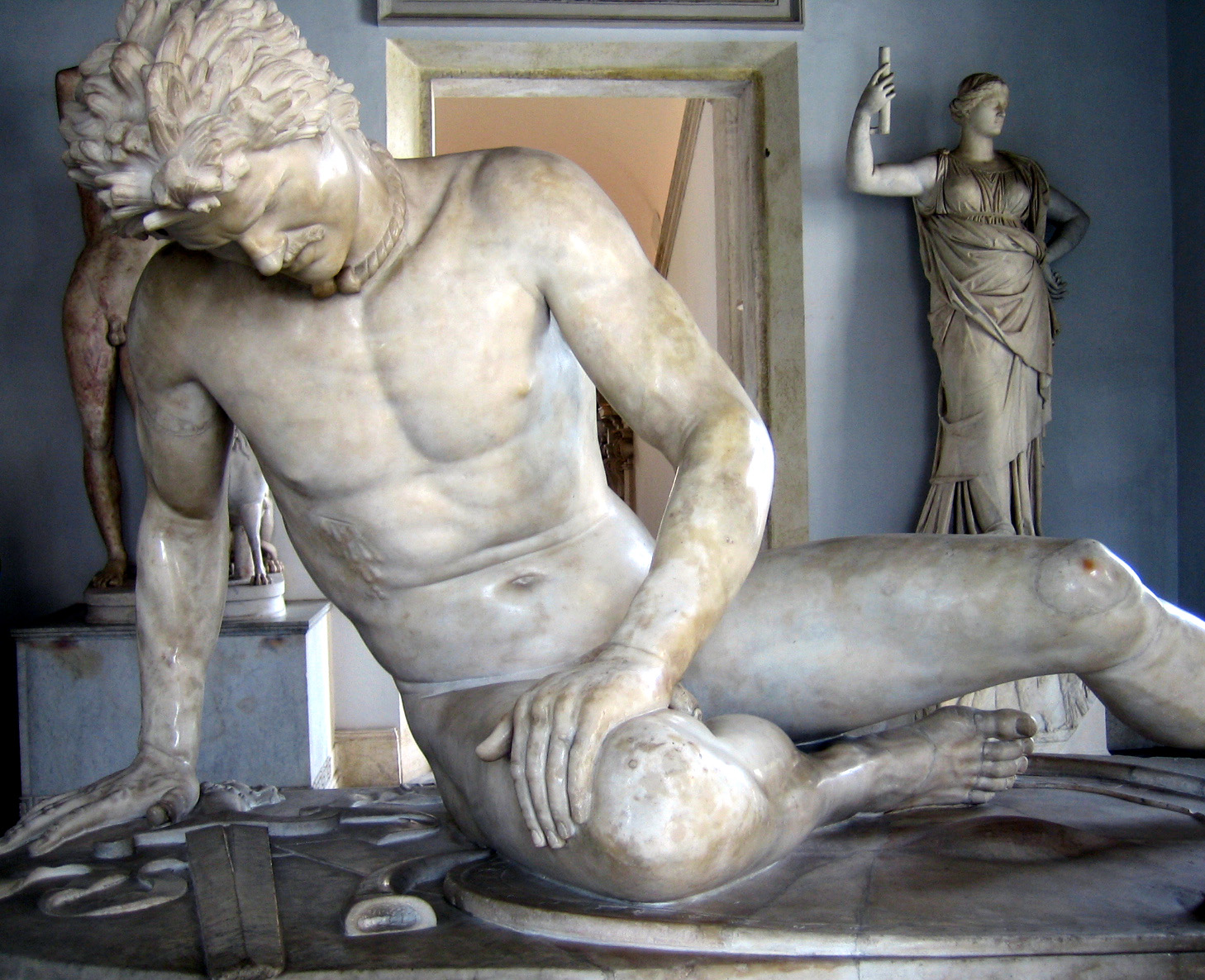
The Dying Galatian was a famous statue commissioned some time between 230 and 220 BC by King Attalos I of Pergamon to honor his victory over the Celtic Galatians in Anatolia. Roman marble copy of a Hellenistic work of the late 3rd century BC, at the Capitoline Museums, Rome.

In 278 BC, the city, along with the rest of central Anatolia, was occupied by a Celtic group, the Galatians (Gauls), who were the first to make Ankara one of their main tribal centers, the headquarters of the Tectosages tribe. Other centers were Pessinus, today's Ballıhisar, for the Trocmi tribe, and Tavium, to the east of Ankara, for the Tolistobogii tribe. The city was then known as Ancyra. The Celtic element was probably relatively small in numbers; a warrior aristocracy which ruled over Phrygian-speaking peasants. However, the Celtic language continued to be spoken in Galatia for many centuries. At the end of the 4th century, St. Jerome, a native of Dalmatia, observed that the language spoken around Ankara was very similar to that being spoken in the northwest of the Roman world near Trier.

=== Roman history ===
The city was subsequently passed under the control of the Roman Empire. In 25 BC, Emperor Augustus raised it to the status of a polis and made it the capital city of the Roman province of Galatia. Ankara is famous for the Monumentum Ancyranum (Temple of Augustus and Rome) which contains the official record of the Acts of Augustus, known as the Res Gestae Divi Augusti, an inscription cut in marble on the walls of this temple. The ruins of Ancyra still furnish today valuable bas-reliefs, inscriptions and other architectural fragments. Two other Galatian tribal centers, Tavium near Yozgat, and Pessinus (Balhisar) to the west, near Sivrihisar, continued to be reasonably important settlements in the Roman period, but it was Ancyra that grew into a grand metropolis.

An estimated 200,000 people lived in Ancyra in good times during the Roman Empire, a far greater number than was to be the case from after the fall of the Roman Empire until the early 20th century. The small Ankara River ran through the center of the Roman town. It has now been covered and diverted, but it formed the northern boundary of the old town during the Roman, Byzantine and Ottoman periods. Çankaya, the rim of the majestic hill to the south of the present city center, stood well outside the Roman city, but may have been a summer resort. In the 19th century, the remains of at least one Roman villa or large house were still standing not far from where the Çankaya Presidential Residence stands today. To the west, the Roman city extended until the area of the Gençlik Park and Railway Station, while on the southern side of the hill, it may have extended downward as far as the site presently occupied by Hacettepe University. It was thus a sizeable city by any standards and much larger than the Roman towns of Gaul or Britannia.

Ancyra's importance rested on the fact that it was the junction point where the roads in northern Anatolia running north–south and east–west intersected, giving it major strategic importance for Rome's eastern frontier. The great imperial road running east passed through Ankara and a succession of emperors and their armies came this way. They were not the only ones to use the Roman highway network, which was equally convenient for invaders. In the second half of the 3rd century, Ancyra was invaded in rapid succession by the Goths coming from the west (who rode far into the heart of Cappadocia, taking slaves and pillaging) and later by the Arabs. For about a decade, the town was one of the western outposts of one of Palmyrean empress Zenobia in the Syrian Desert, who took advantage of a period of weakness and disorder in the Roman Empire to set up a short-lived state of her own.

The town was reincorporated into the Roman Empire under Emperor Aurelian in 272. The tetrarchy, a system of multiple (up to four) emperors introduced by Diocletian (284–305), seems to have engaged in a substantial program of rebuilding and of road construction from Ancyra westwards to Germe and Dorylaeum (now Eskişehir).

In its heyday, Roman Ancyra was a large market and trading center but it also functioned as a major administrative capital, where a high official ruled from the city's Praetorium, a large administrative palace or office. During the 3rd century, life in Ancyra, as in other Anatolian towns, seems to have become somewhat militarized in response to the invasions and instability of the town.

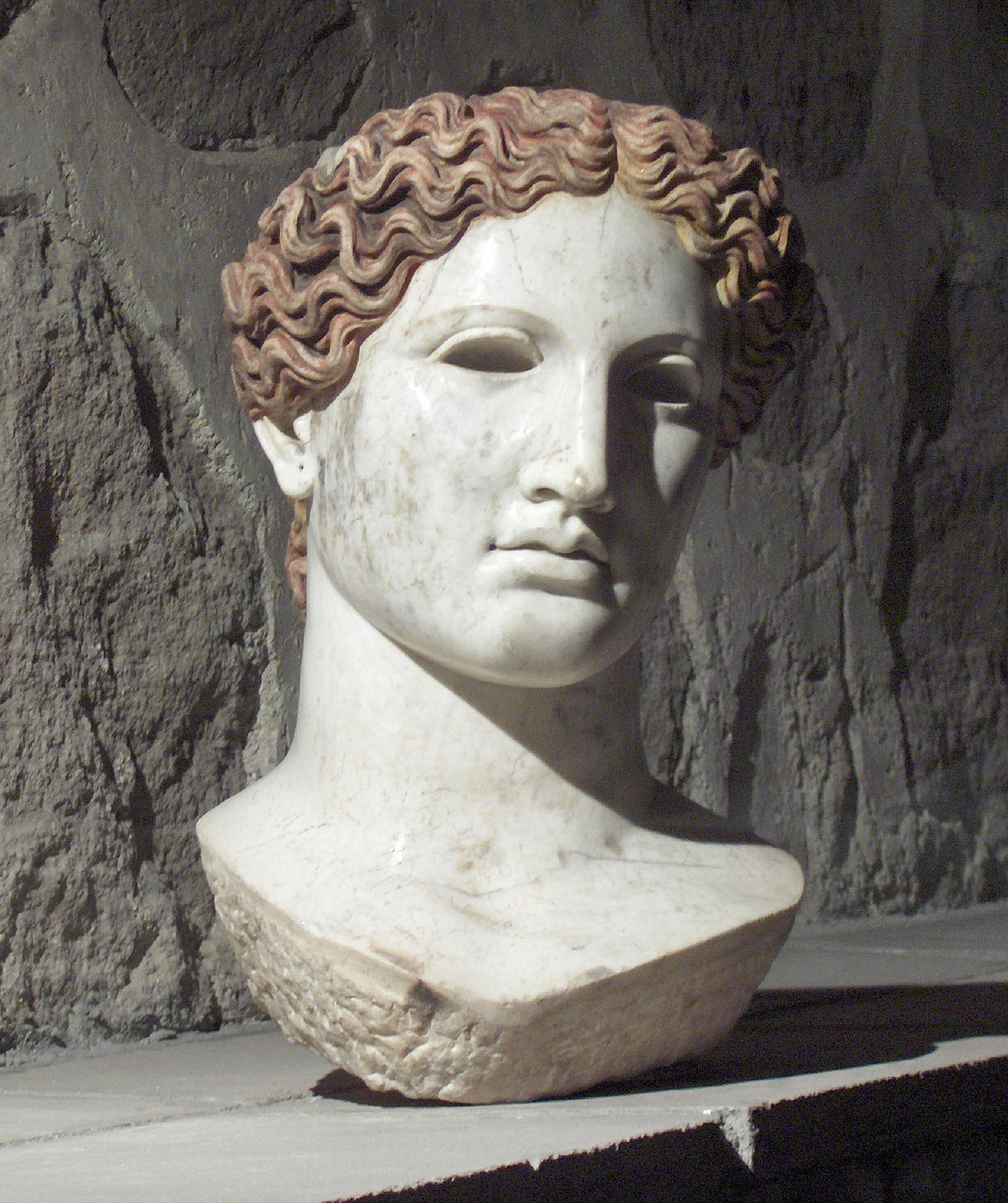
Marble head of a Roman woman on display at the Museum of Anatolian Civilizations.

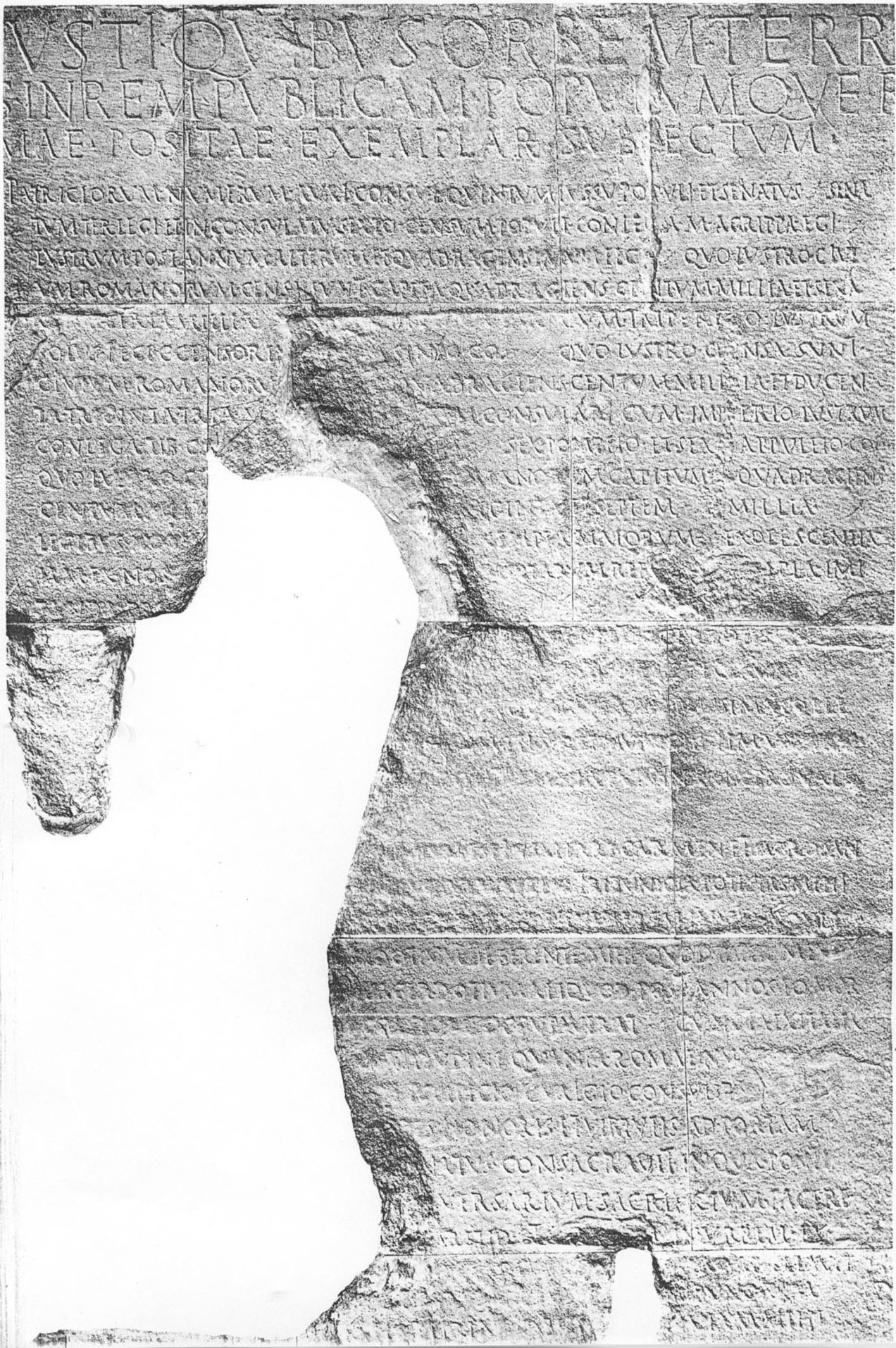
The Res Gestae Divi Augusti is the self-laudatory autobiography completed in 13 AD, just before his death, by the first Roman emperor Augustus. Most of the text is preserved on the walls of the Monumentum Ancyranum.

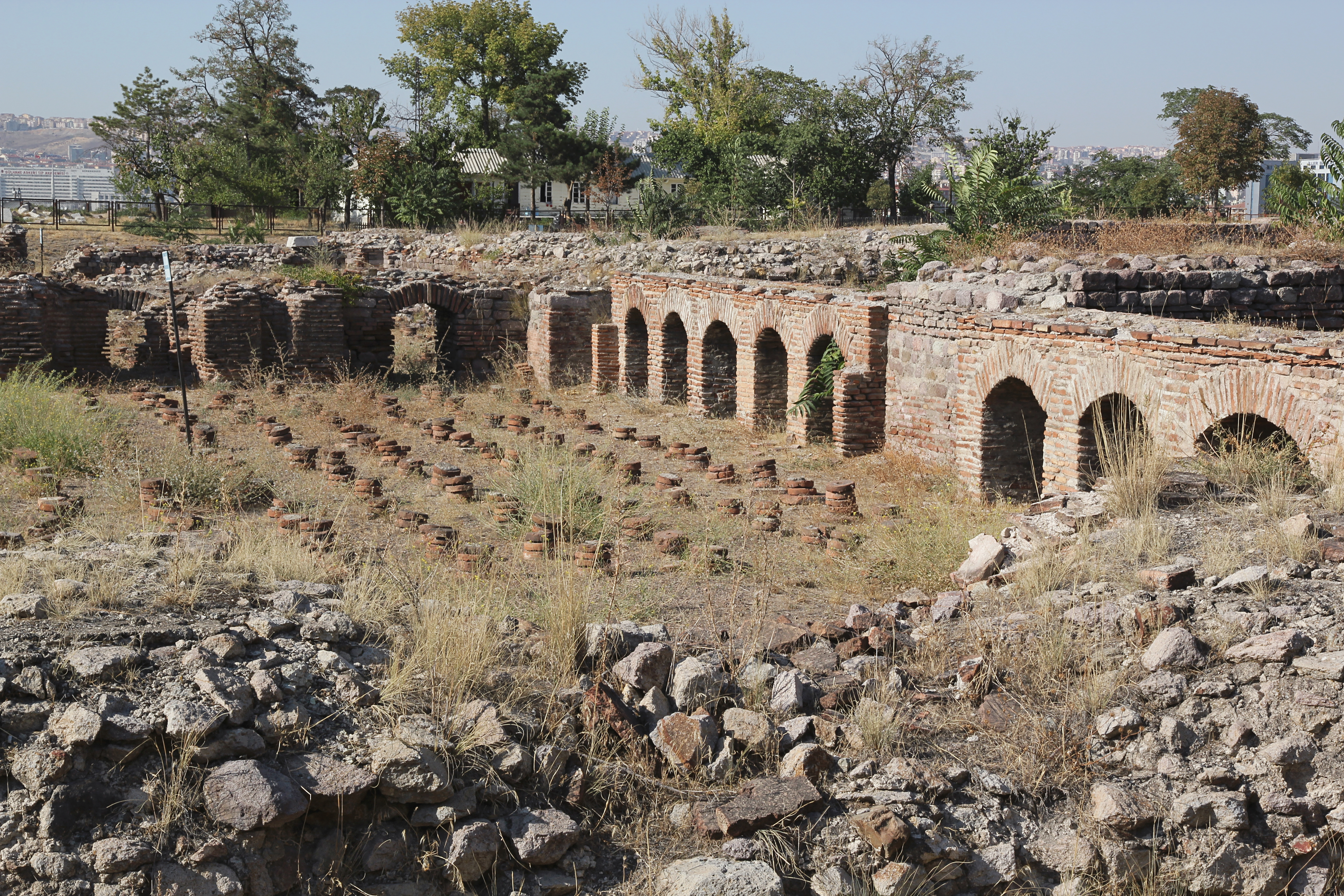
The Roman Baths of Ankara were constructed by the Roman emperor Caracalla (212–217) in honor of Asclepios, the God of Medicine, and built around three principal rooms: the caldarium (hot bath), the tepidarium (warm bath) and the frigidarium (cold bath) in a typically laid-out 80-by-120-meter (260-by-390-foot) classical complex.

=== Byzantine history ===
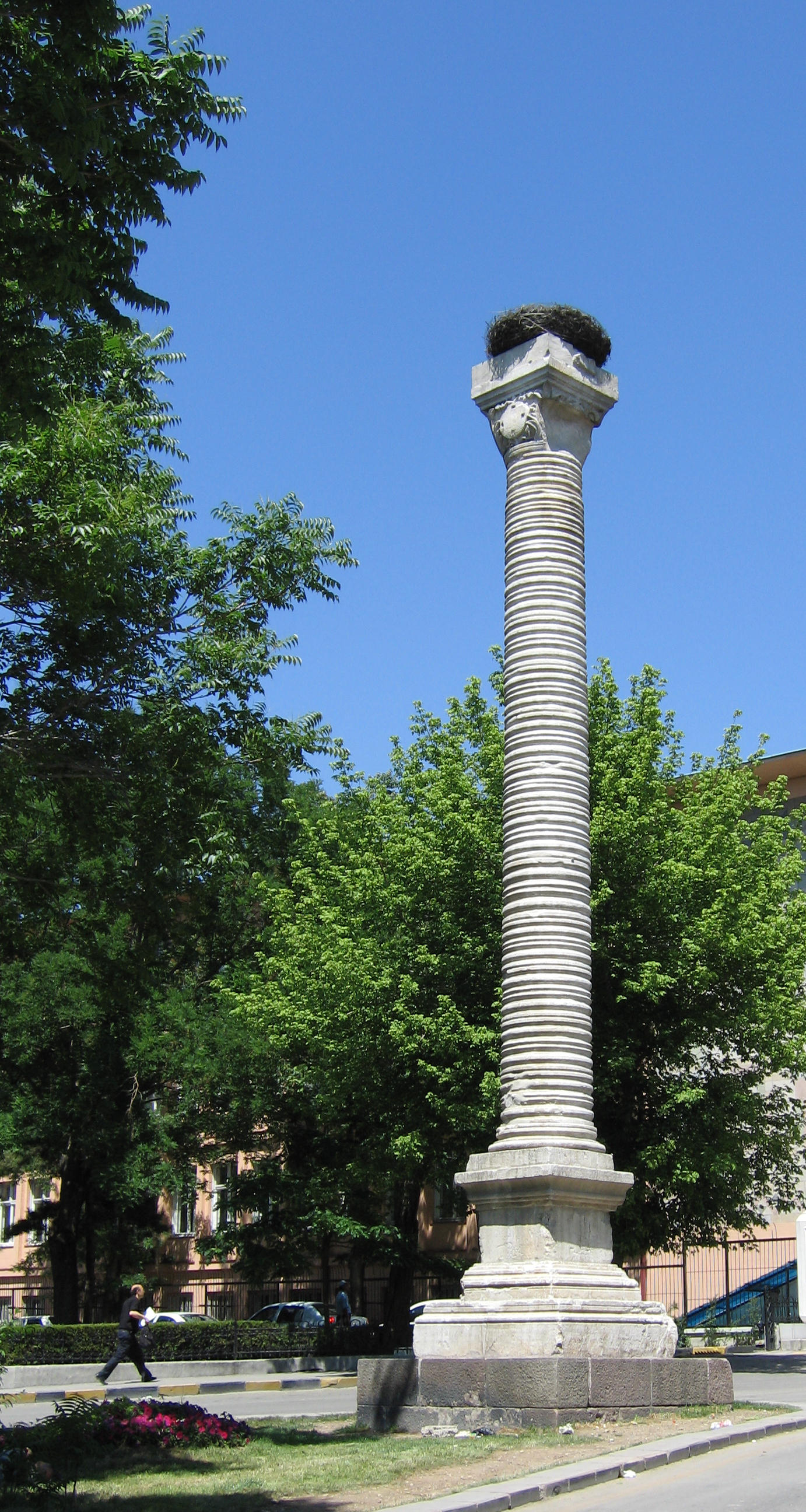
The Column of Julian (362) was erected in honor of the Roman emperor Julian the Apostate's visit to Ancyra.

The city is well known during the 4th century as a center of Christian activity (see also below), due to frequent imperial visits, and through the letters of the pagan scholar Libanius. Bishop Marcellus of Ancyra and Basil of Ancyra were active in the theological controversies of their day, and the city was the site of no fewer than three church synods in 314, 358 and 375, the latter two in favor of Arianism.

The city was visited by Emperor Constans I (r. 337–350) in 347 and 350, Julian (r. 361–363) during his Persian campaign in 362, and Julian's successor Jovian (r. 363–364) in winter 363/364 (he entered his consulship while in the city). After Jovian's death soon after, Valentinian I (r. 364–375) was acclaimed emperor at Ancyra, and in the next year his brother Valens (r. 364–378) used Ancyra as his base against the usurper Procopius. When the province of Galatia was divided sometime in 396/99, Ancyra remained the civil capital of Galatia I, as well as its ecclesiastical center (metropolitan see). Emperor Arcadius (r. 383–408) frequently used the city as his summer residence, and some information about the ecclesiastical affairs of the city during the early 5th century is found in the works of Palladius of Galatia and Nilus of Ancyra.

In 479, the rebel Marcian attacked the city, without being able to capture it. In 610/11, Comentiolus, brother of Emperor Phocas (r. 602–610), launched his own unsuccessful rebellion in the city against Heraclius (r. 610–641). Ten years later, in 620 or more likely 622, it was captured by the Sassanid Persians during the Byzantine–Sassanid War of 602–628. Although the city returned to Byzantine hands after the end of the war, the Persian presence left traces in the city's archaeology, and likely began the process of its transformation from a late antique city to a medieval fortified settlement.

In 654, the city, also known in Arabic sources as Qalat as-Salasil ("fortress of the chains"), was captured for the first time by the Arabs of the Rashidun Caliphate, under Muawiyah, the future founder of the Umayyad Caliphate. At about the same time, the themes were established in Anatolia, and Ancyra became capital of the Opsician Theme, which was the largest and most important theme until it was split up under Emperor Constantine V (r. 741–775); Ancyra then became the capital of the new Bucellarian Theme. The city was captured at least temporarily by the Umayyad prince Maslama ibn Hisham in 739/40, the last of the Umayyads' territorial gains from the Byzantine Empire. Ancyra was attacked without success by Abbasid forces in 776 and in 798/99. In 805, Emperor Nikephoros I (r. 802–811) strengthened its fortifications, a fact which probably saved it from sack during the large-scale invasion of Anatolia by Caliph Harun al-Rashid in the next year. Arab sources report that Harun and his successor al-Ma'mun (r. 813–833) took the city, but this information is later invention. In 838, however, during the Amorium campaign, the armies of Caliph al-Mu'tasim (r. 833–842) converged and met at the city; abandoned by its inhabitants, Ancara was razed to the ground, before the Arab armies went on to besiege and destroy Amorium reaching as far as Smyrna. In 859, Emperor Michael III (r. 842–867) came to the city during a campaign against the Arabs, and ordered its fortifications restored. In 872, the city was menaced, but not taken, by the Paulicians under Chrysocheir. The last Arab raid to reach the city was undertaken in 931, by the Abbasid governor of Tarsus, Thamal al-Dulafi, but the city again was not captured.

=== Ecclesiastical history ===
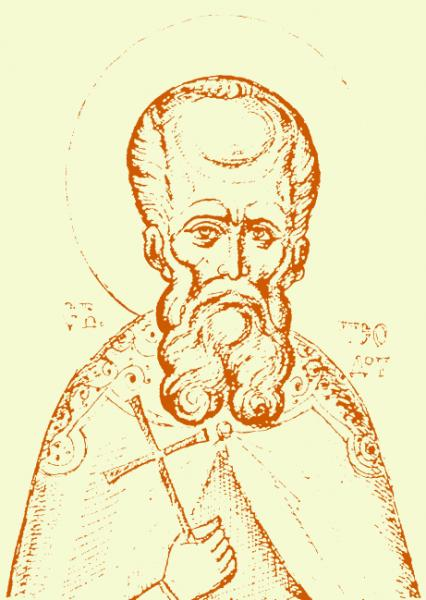
St. Theodotus of Ancyra

Early Christian martyrs of Ancyra, about whom little is known, included Proklos and Hilarios who were natives of the otherwise unknown nearby village of Kallippi, and suffered repression under the emperor Trajan (98–117). In the 280s we hear of Philumenos, a Christian corn merchant from southern Anatolia, being captured and martyred in Ankara, and Eustathius.

As in other Roman towns, the reign of Diocletian marked the culmination of the persecution of the Christians. In 303, Ancyra was one of the towns where the co-emperors Diocletian and his deputy Galerius launched their anti-Christian persecution. In Ancyra, their first target was the 38-year-old Bishop of the town, whose name was Clement. Clement's life describes how he was taken to Rome, then sent back, and forced to undergo many interrogations and hardship before he, and his brother, and various companions were put to death. The remains of the church of St. Clement can be found today in a building just off Işıklar Caddesi in the Ulus district. Quite possibly this marks the site where Clement was originally buried. Four years later, a doctor of the town named Plato and his brother Antiochus also became celebrated martyrs under Galerius. Theodotus of Ancyra is also venerated as a saint.

However, the persecution proved unsuccessful and in 314 Ancyra was the center of an important council of the early church; its 25 disciplinary canons constitute one of the most important documents in the early history of the administration of the Sacrament of Penance. The synod also considered ecclesiastical policy for the reconstruction of the Christian Church after the persecutions, and in particular the treatment of lapsi—Christians who had given in to forced paganism (sacrifices) to avoid martyrdom during these persecutions.

Though paganism was probably tottering in Ancyra in Clement's day, it may still have been the majority religion. Twenty years later, Christianity and monotheism had taken its place. Ancyra quickly turned into a Christian city, with a life dominated by monks and priests and theological disputes. The town council or senate gave way to the bishop as the main local figurehead. During the middle of the 4th century, Ancyra was involved in the complex theological disputes over the nature of Christ, and a form of Arianism seems to have originated there.

In 362–363, Emperor Julian passed through Ancyra on his way to an ill-fated campaign against the Persians, and according to Christian sources, engaged in a persecution of various holy men. The stone base for a statue, with an inscription describing Julian as "Lord of the whole world from the British Ocean to the barbarian nations", can still be seen, built into the eastern side of the inner circuit of the walls of Ankara Castle. The Column of Julian which was erected in honor of the emperor's visit to the city in 362 still stands today. In 375, Arian bishops met at Ancyra and deposed several bishops, among them St. Gregory of Nyssa.

In the late 4th century, Ancyra became something of an imperial holiday resort. After Constantinople became the East Roman capital, emperors in the 4th and 5th centuries would retire from the humid summer weather on the Bosporus to the drier mountain atmosphere of Ancyra. Theodosius II (408–450) kept his court in Ancyra in the summers. Laws issued in Ancyra testify to the time they spent there.

The Metropolis of Ancyra continued to be a residential see of the Eastern Orthodox Church until the 20th century, with about 40,000 faithful, mostly Turkish-speaking, but that situation ended as a result of the 1923 Convention Concerning the Exchange of Greek and Turkish Populations. The earlier Armenian genocide put an end to the residential eparchy of Ancyra of the Armenian Catholic Church, which had been established in 1850. It is also a titular metropolis of the Ecumenical Patriarchate of Constantinople.

Both the Ancient Byzantine Metropolitan archbishopric and the 'modern' Armenian eparchy are now listed by the Catholic Church as titular sees, with separate apostolic successions.

=== Seljuk and Ottoman history ===
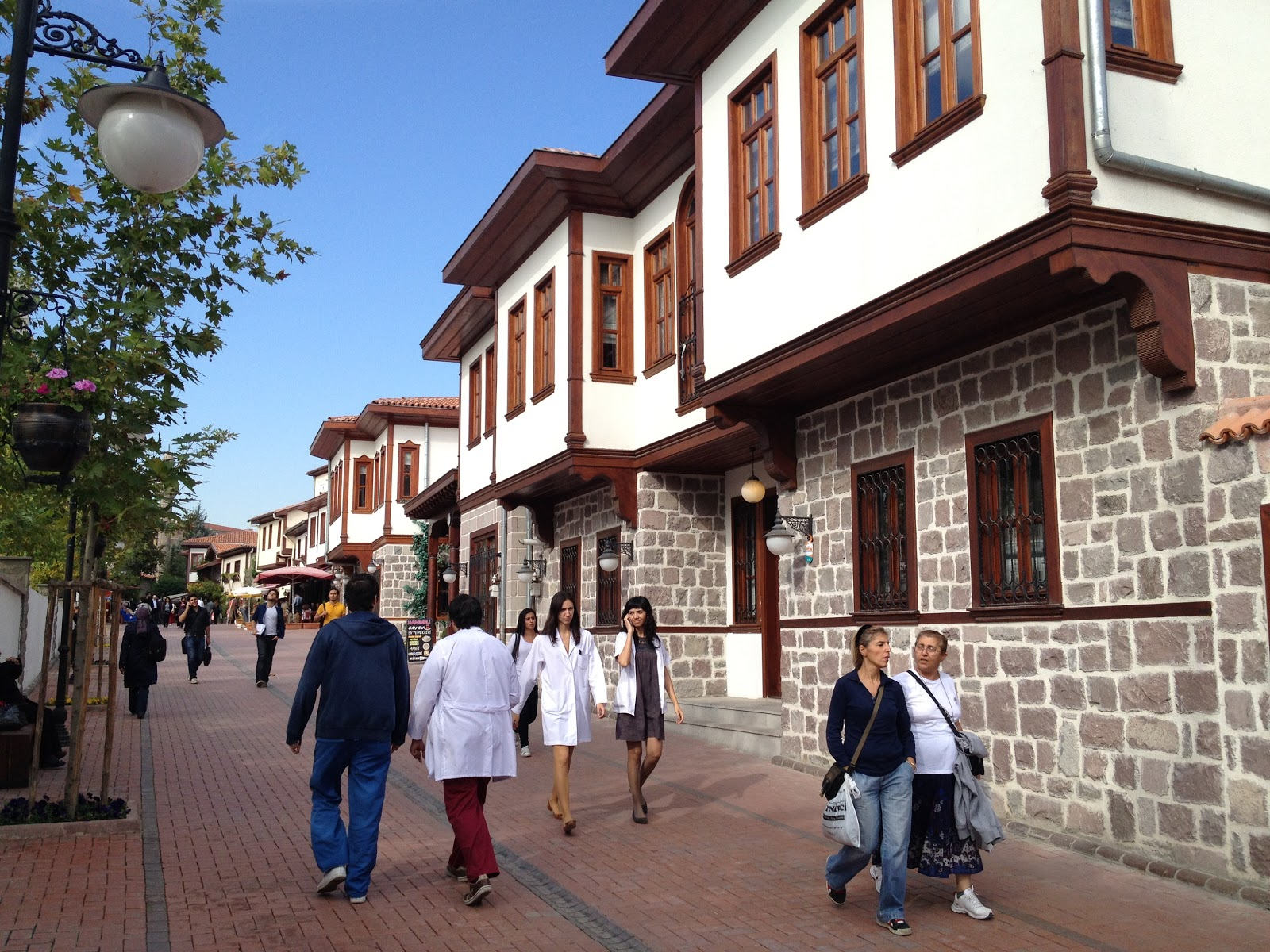
Ottoman houses in Hamamönü district

After the Battle of Manzikert in 1071, the Seljuk Turks overran much of Anatolia. By 1073, the Turkish settlers had reached the vicinity of Ancyra, and the city was captured shortly after, at the latest by the time of the rebellion of Nikephoros Melissenos in 1081. In 1101, when the Crusade under Raymond IV of Toulouse arrived, the city had been under Danishmend control for some time. The Crusaders captured the city, and handed it over to the Byzantine emperor Alexios I Komnenos (r. 1081–1118). Byzantine rule did not last long, and the city was captured by the Seljuk Sultanate of Rum at some unknown point; in 1127, it returned to Danishmend control until 1143, when the Seljuks of Rum retook it.

After the Battle of Köse Dağ in 1243, in which the Mongols defeated the Seljuks, most of Anatolia became part of the dominion of the Mongols. Taking advantage of Seljuk decline, a semi-religious cast of craftsmen and trade people named Ahiler chose Angora as their independent city-state in 1290. Orhan, the second Bey of the Ottoman Empire, captured the city in 1356. Timur defeated Bayezid I at the Battle of Ankara in 1402 and took the city, but in 1403 Angora was again under Ottoman control.

The Levant Company maintained a factory in the town from 1639 to 1768. In the 19th century, its population was estimated at 20,000 to 60,000. It was sacked by Egyptians under Ibrahim Pasha in 1832.

From 1867 to 1922, the city served as the capital of the Angora Vilayet, which included most of ancient Galatia.

Prior to World War I, the town had a British consulate and a population of around 28,000, roughly 1/3 of whom were Christian.

=== Turkish republican capital ===
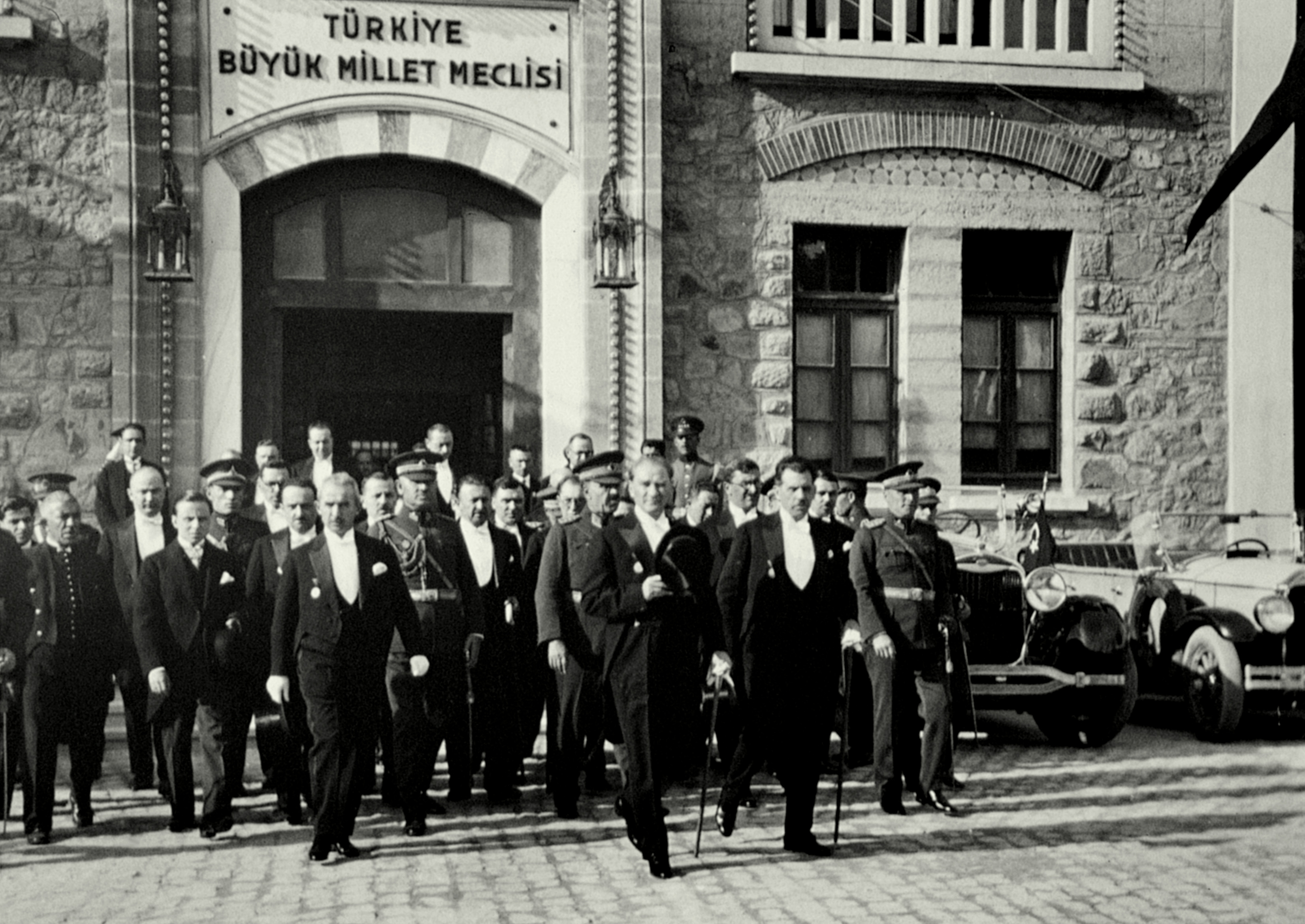
President Mustafa Kemal Atatürk (center) and Prime Minister İsmet İnönü (left) leaving the Grand National Assembly of Türkiye during the 7th anniversary celebrations of the Turkish Republic in 1930

Following the Ottoman defeat in World War I, the Ottoman capital Constantinople (modern Istanbul) and much of Anatolia was occupied by the Allies, who planned to share these lands between Armenia, France, Greece, Italy and the United Kingdom, leaving for the Turks the core piece of land in central Anatolia. In response, the leader of the Turkish nationalist movement, Mustafa Kemal Atatürk, established the headquarters of his resistance movement in Angora in 1920. After the Turkish War of Independence was won and the Treaty of Sèvres was superseded by the Treaty of Lausanne (1923), the Turkish nationalists replaced the Ottoman Empire with the Republic of Turkey on 29 October 1923. A few days earlier, Angora had officially replaced Constantinople as the new Turkish capital city, on 13 October 1923, and Republican officials declared that the city's name is Ankara.

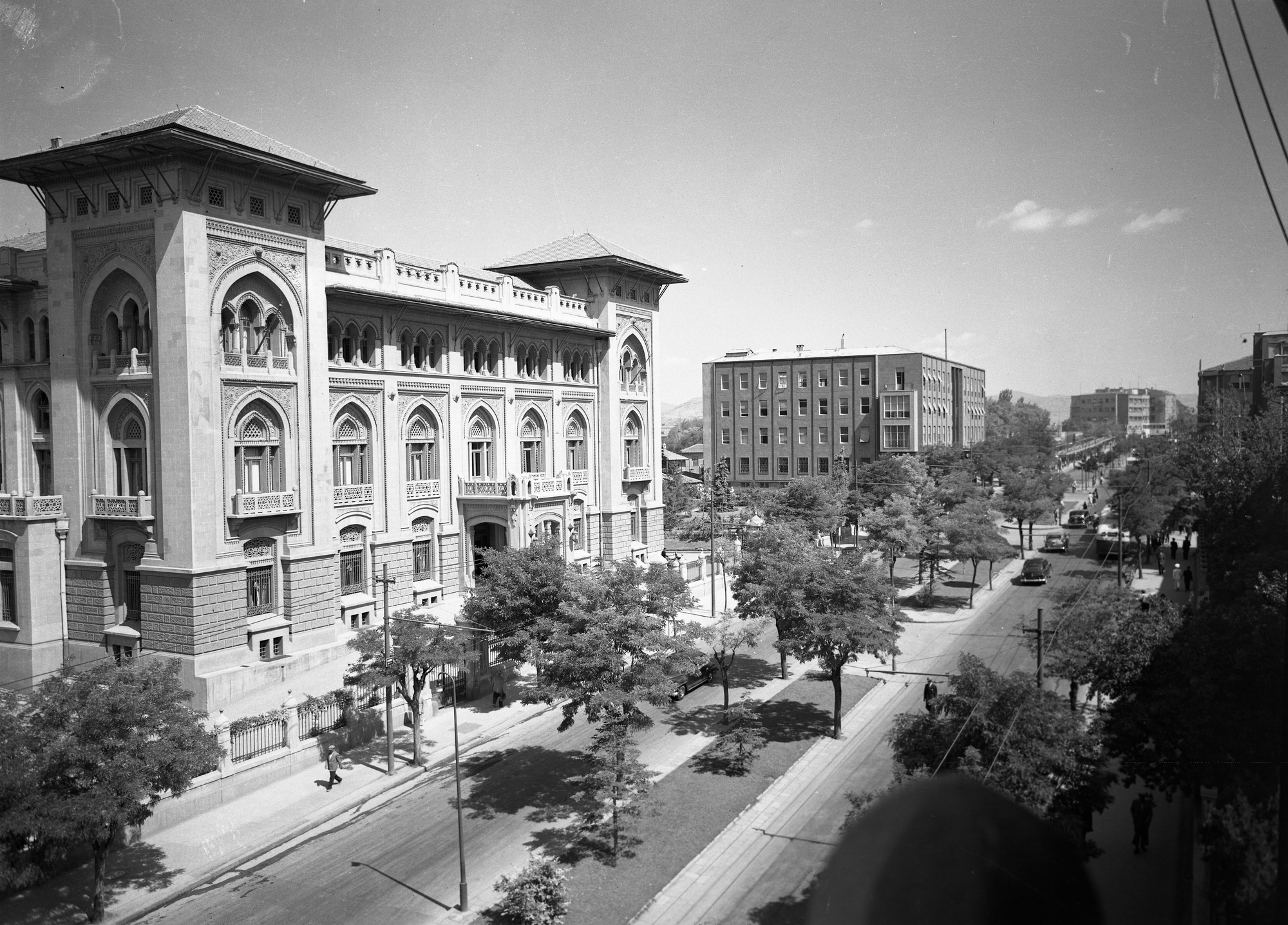
A view of the old general directorate building of Ziraat Bank. It was designed by Istanbul-born Italian Levantine architect Giulio Mongeri and built between 1926 and 1929.

After Ankara became the capital of the newly founded Republic of Turkey, new development divided the city into an old section, called Ulus, and a new section, called Yenişehir. Ancient buildings reflecting Roman, Byzantine, and Ottoman history and narrow winding streets mark the old section. The new section, now centered on Kızılay Square, has the trappings of a more modern city: wide streets, hotels, theaters, shopping malls, and high-rises.

Government offices and foreign embassies are also located in the new section. Ankara has experienced a phenomenal growth since it was made Turkey's capital in 1923, when it was "a small town of no importance". In 1924, the year after the government had moved there, Ankara had about 35,000 residents. By 1927 there were 44,553 residents and by 1950 the population had grown to 286,781. After 1930, the city officially became known in Western languages as Ankara. By the late 1930s, the English name "Angora" was no longer in popular use.

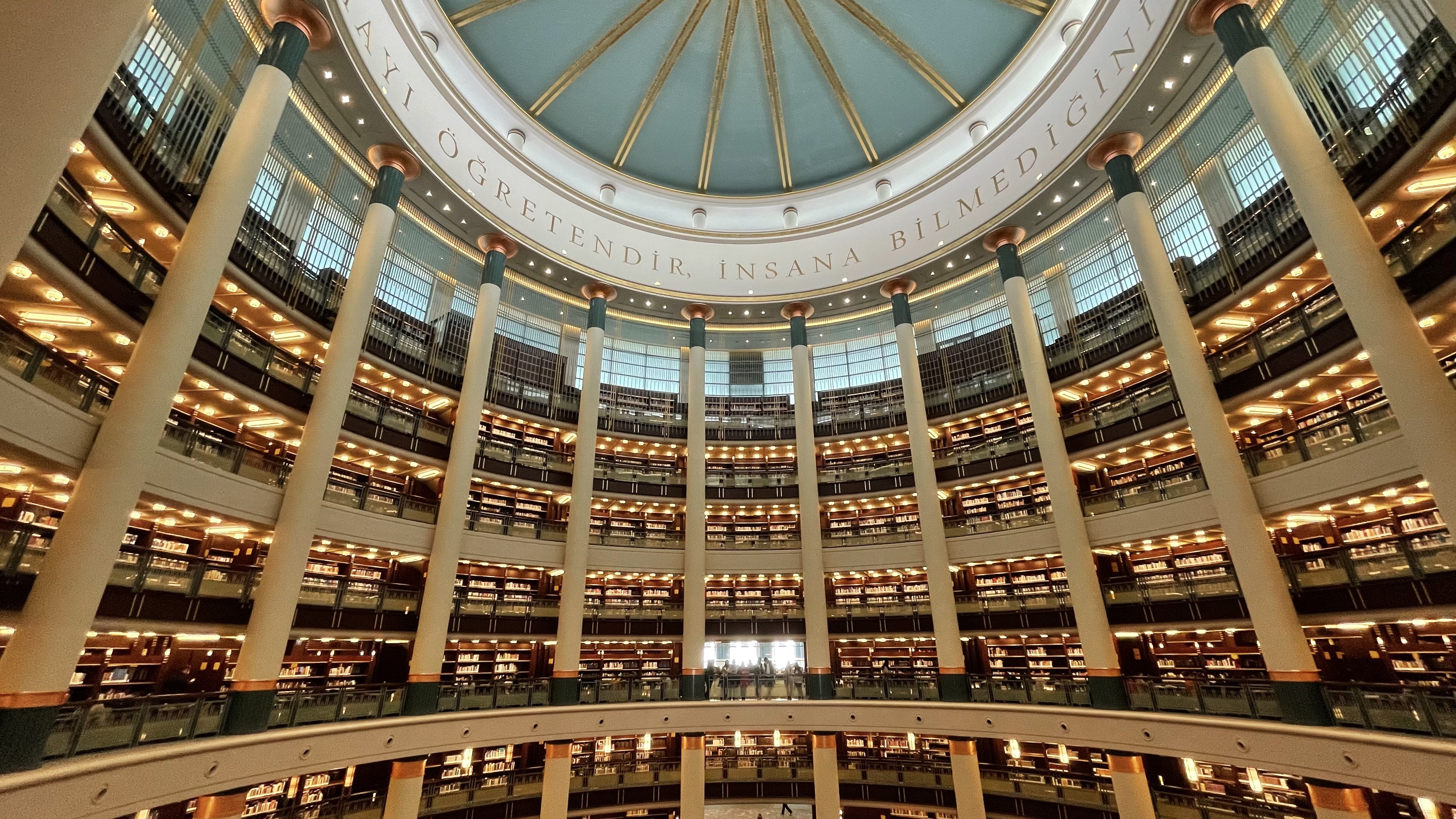
The Presidential Library in Ankara is the largest library in Turkey, with a collection of over 4 million printed books and over 120 million electronic editions published in 134 languages.

Ankara continued to grow rapidly during the latter half of the 20th century and eventually outranked İzmir as Turkey's second-largest city, after Istanbul. Ankara's urban population reached 4,587,558 in 2014, while the population of Ankara Province reached 5,150,072 in 2015.

The Presidential Palace of Turkey is situated in Ankara. This building serves as the main residence of the president.

== Geography ==
Köppen map of Ankara Province and surrounding regions:
- BSk
- Csb
- Dfb
- Dsb

Geographically, Ankara is located in between the Kızılırmak and Sakarya rivers, and the Sakarya River forms its border with Eskişehir in the west. Ankara shares its borders with Bolu and Çankırı in the north; Konya in the south and Kırıkkale in the east.

Ankara and its province are located in the Central Anatolia Region of Turkey. The Çubuk Brook flows through the city center of Ankara. It is connected in the western suburbs of the city to the Ankara River, which is a tributary of the Sakarya River.

=== Climate ===
Ankara has a cold semi-arid climate under the Köppen climate classification (BSk), while under the Trewartha climate classification, the city is classified as humid continental (Dc). Due to its elevation and inland location, Ankara has cold and snowy winters, and hot and dry summers. Rainfall occurs mostly during the spring and autumn. The city lies in USDA Hardiness zone 7b, and its annual average precipitation is fairly low at 414 millimeters (16 in), nevertheless precipitation can be observed throughout the year. Monthly mean temperatures range from 0.9 °C (33.6 °F) in January to 24.3 °C (75.7 °F) in July, with an annual mean of 12.6 °C (54.7 °F). Ankara's overall temperature regime is very similar to New York City.

Climate data for Ankara (Turkish State Meteorological Service Compound, Keçiören), 1991–2020, extremes 1927–2023
Month	Jan	Feb	Mar	Apr	May	Jun	Jul	Aug	Sep	Oct	Nov	Dec	Year
Mean daily maximum °C (°F)	4.7 (40.5)	7.4 (45.3)	12.2 (54.0)	17.5 (63.5)	22.8 (73.0)	27.3 (81.1)	31.0 (87.8)	31.0 (87.8)	26.5 (79.7)	20.3 (68.5)	13.0 (55.4)	6.7 (44.1)	18.4 (65.1)
Daily mean °C (°F)	0.9 (33.6)	2.7 (36.9)	6.7 (44.1)	11.5 (52.7)	16.5 (61.7)	20.6 (69.1)	24.2 (75.6)	24.3 (75.7)	19.6 (67.3)	13.9 (57.0)	7.3 (45.1)	2.8 (37.0)	12.6 (54.7)
Mean daily minimum °C (°F)	−2.2 (28.0)	−1.2 (29.8)	1.9 (35.4)	6.0 (42.8)	10.5 (50.9)	14.1 (57.4)	17.2 (63.0)	17.4 (63.3)	13.1 (55.6)	8.4 (47.1)	2.7 (36.9)	−0.3 (31.5)	7.3 (45.1)
Average precipitation mm (inches)	38.6 (1.52)	36.6 (1.44)	46.9 (1.85)	44.5 (1.75)	51.0 (2.01)	40.2 (1.58)	14.8 (0.58)	14.6 (0.57)	17.9 (0.70)	33.4 (1.31)	31.9 (1.26)	43.2 (1.70)	413.6 (16.28)
Average precipitation days	11.67	10.9	10.47	11.63	12	9.27	3.37	3.67	4.17	7.63	7.67	11.27	103.72
Average relative humidity (%)	76.7	70.7	63.2	58.4	56.3	53.1	45.5	45.3	48.8	60.2	68.6	76.7	60.2
Mean monthly sunshine hours	69.6	100.9	147.3	187.9	239.2	279.5	327.8	308.7	261.9	190.6	125.0	72.4	2,287.2
Mean daily sunshine hours	2.2	3.6	4.8	6.3	7.7	9.3	10.6	10.0	8.7	6.2	4.3	2.4	6.3
Percentage possible sunshine	26	34	42	47	56	67	76	75	69	53	37	24	51
Average ultraviolet index	2	3	4	6	8	10	10	9	7	4	2	2	6
Source 1: Turkish State Meteorological Service
Source 2: NOAA (humidity, sun 1991–2020) and Weather Atlas (uv index)

== Demographics ==
Historical population

Year	Pop.	±% p.a.
2007	4,466,756	—
2012	4,965,542	+2.14%

Year	Pop.	±% p.a.
2017	5,445,026	+1.86%
2022	5,782,285	+1.21%

Source: TÜİK

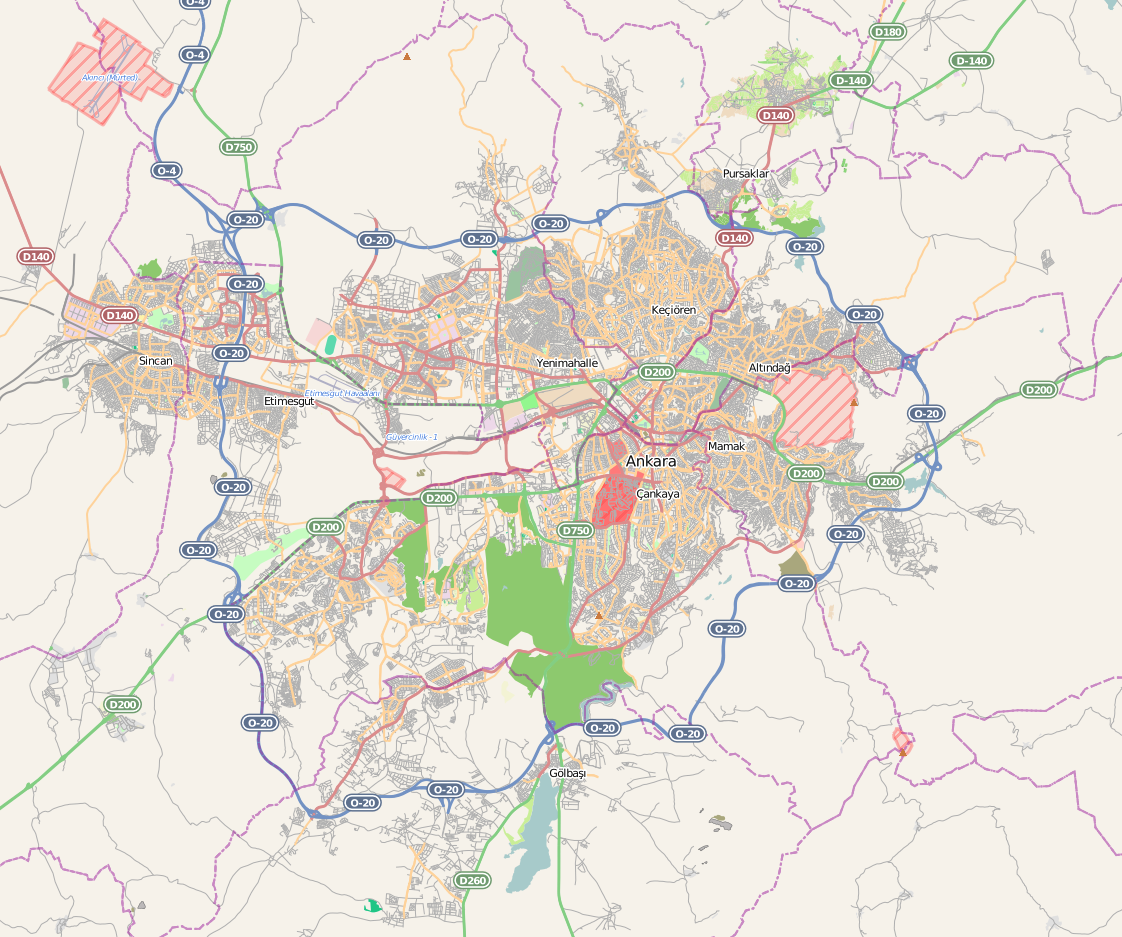
Ankara metropolitan area

Ankara had a population of 75,000 in 1927. There were 74,632 male residents and 48,882 female residents in Ankara according to the 1935 census. As of 2022, the population of the Ankara Province was 5,782,285. When Ankara became the capital of the Republic of Turkey in 1923, it was designated as a planned city for 500,000 future inhabitants. During the 1920s, 1930s and 1940s, the city grew in a planned and orderly pace. However, from the 1950s onward, the city grew much faster than envisioned, because unemployment and poverty forced people to migrate from the countryside into the city to seek a better standard of living. As a result, many illegal houses called gecekondu were built around the city, causing the unplanned and uncontrolled urban landscape of Ankara, as not enough planned housing could be built fast enough. Although precariously built, the vast majority of them have electricity, running water and modern household amenities.

Nevertheless, many of these gecekondus have been replaced by huge public housing projects in the form of tower blocks such as Elvankent, Eryaman and Güzelkent; and also as mass housing compounds for military and civil service accommodation. Although many gecekondus still remain, they too are gradually being replaced by mass housing compounds, as empty land plots in the city of Ankara for new construction projects are becoming impossible to find.

Çorum and Yozgat, which are located in Central Anatolia and whose population is decreasing, are the provinces with the highest net migration to Ankara. About one third of the Central Anatolia population of 15,608,868 people resides in Ankara.

The literacy rate in the whole province for people who are 15 years old or older is 98.18% according to 2020 TÜİK data. Ankara Province also has the highest percentage of tertiary education graduates in Turkey with 29.08% of the population having either an undergraduate, master's or doctor's degree.

== Economy and infrastructure ==
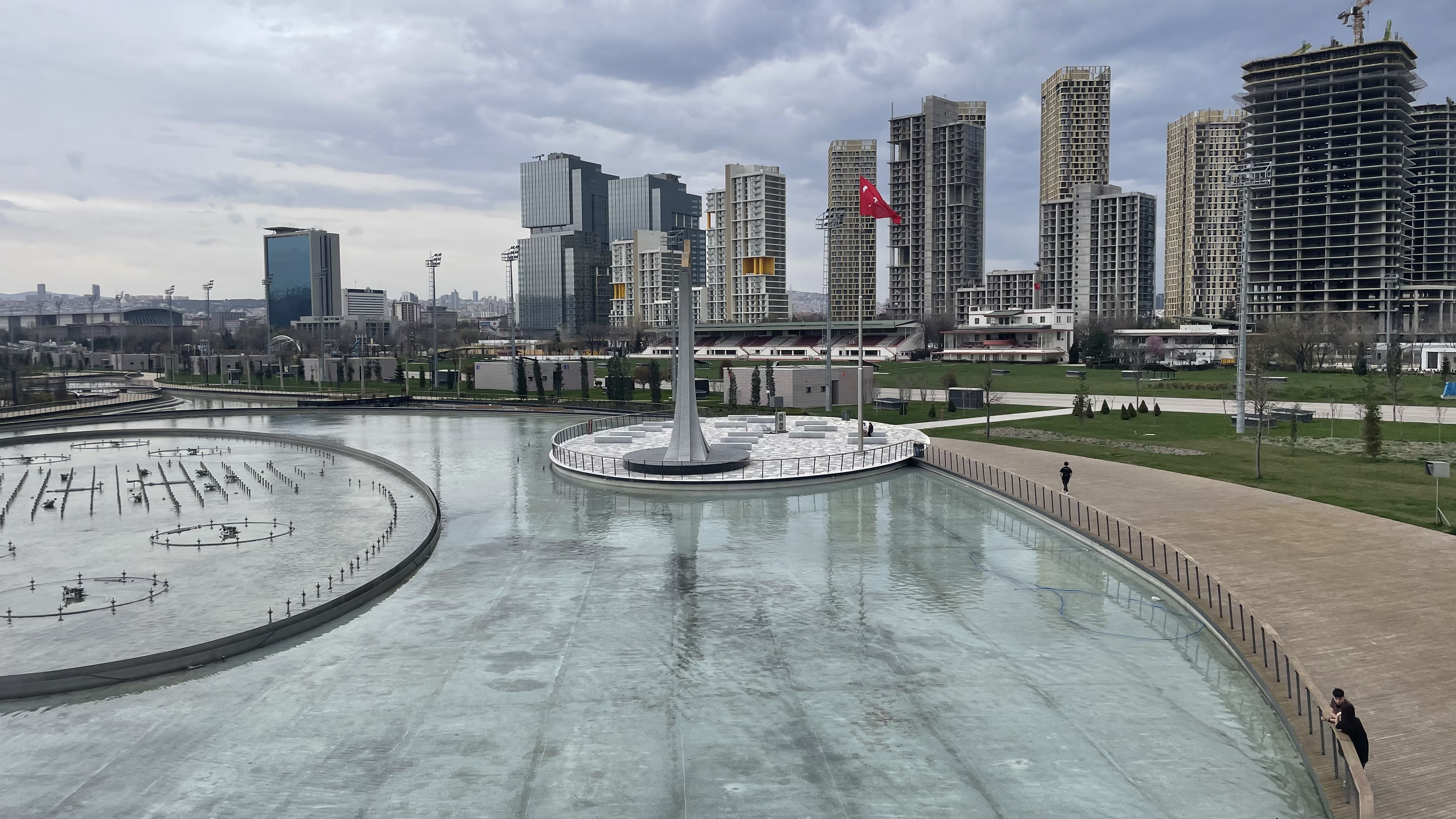
Başkent Millet Park in Ankara

Ankara has long been a productive agricultural region in Anatolia. In the Ottoman period, Ankara was well known for producing grain, cotton, and fruits.

The city has exported mohair (from the Angora goat) and Angora wool (from the Angora rabbit) internationally for centuries. In the 19th century, the city also exported substantial amounts of goat and cat skins, gum, wax, honey, berries, and madder root. It was connected to Istanbul by railway before the First World War, continuing to export mohair, wool, berries, and grain.

The Central Anatolia Region is one of the primary locations of grape and wine production in Turkey, and Ankara is particularly famous for its Kalecik Karası and Muscat grapes; and its Kavaklıdere wine, which is produced in the Kavaklıdere neighborhood within the Çankaya district of the city. Ankara is also famous for its pears. Another natural product of Ankara is its indigenous type of honey (Ankara Balı) which is known for its light color and is mostly produced by the Atatürk Forest Farm and Zoo in the Gazi district, and by other facilities in the Elmadağ, Çubuk and Beypazarı districts. Çubuk-1 and Çubuk-2 dams on the Çubuk Brook in Ankara were among the first dams constructed in the Turkish Republic.

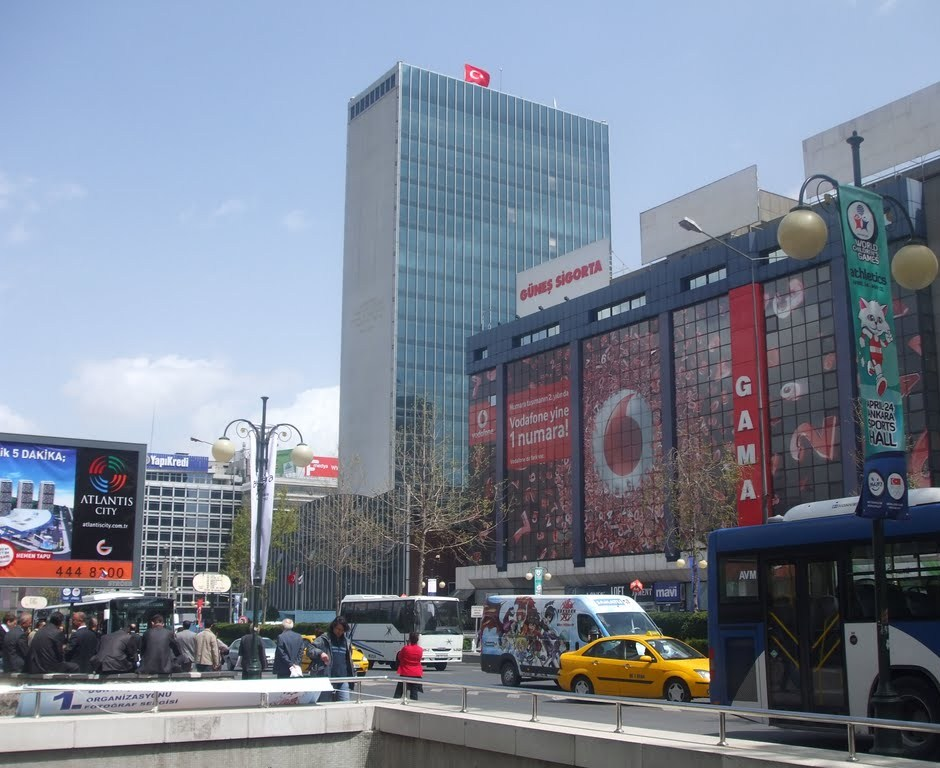
Kızılay Square and Emek Business Center (1959–1965), the first International Style office tower and shopping center in Turkey.

Ankara is the center of the state-owned and private Turkish defence and aerospace companies, where the industrial plants and headquarters of the Turkish Aerospace Industries, MKE, ASELSAN, HAVELSAN, ROKETSAN, FNSS, Nurol Makina, and numerous other firms are located. Exports to foreign countries from these defense and aerospace firms have steadily increased in the past decades. The IDEF in Ankara is one of the largest international expositions of the global arms industry. A number of the global automotive companies also have production facilities in Ankara, such as the German bus and truck manufacturer MAN SE. Ankara hosts the OSTIM Industrial Zone, Turkey's largest industrial park.

A large percentage of the complicated employment in Ankara is provided by the state institutions; such as the ministries, subministries, and other administrative bodies of the Turkish government. There are also many foreign citizens working as diplomats or clerks in the embassies of their respective countries.

== Transportation ==
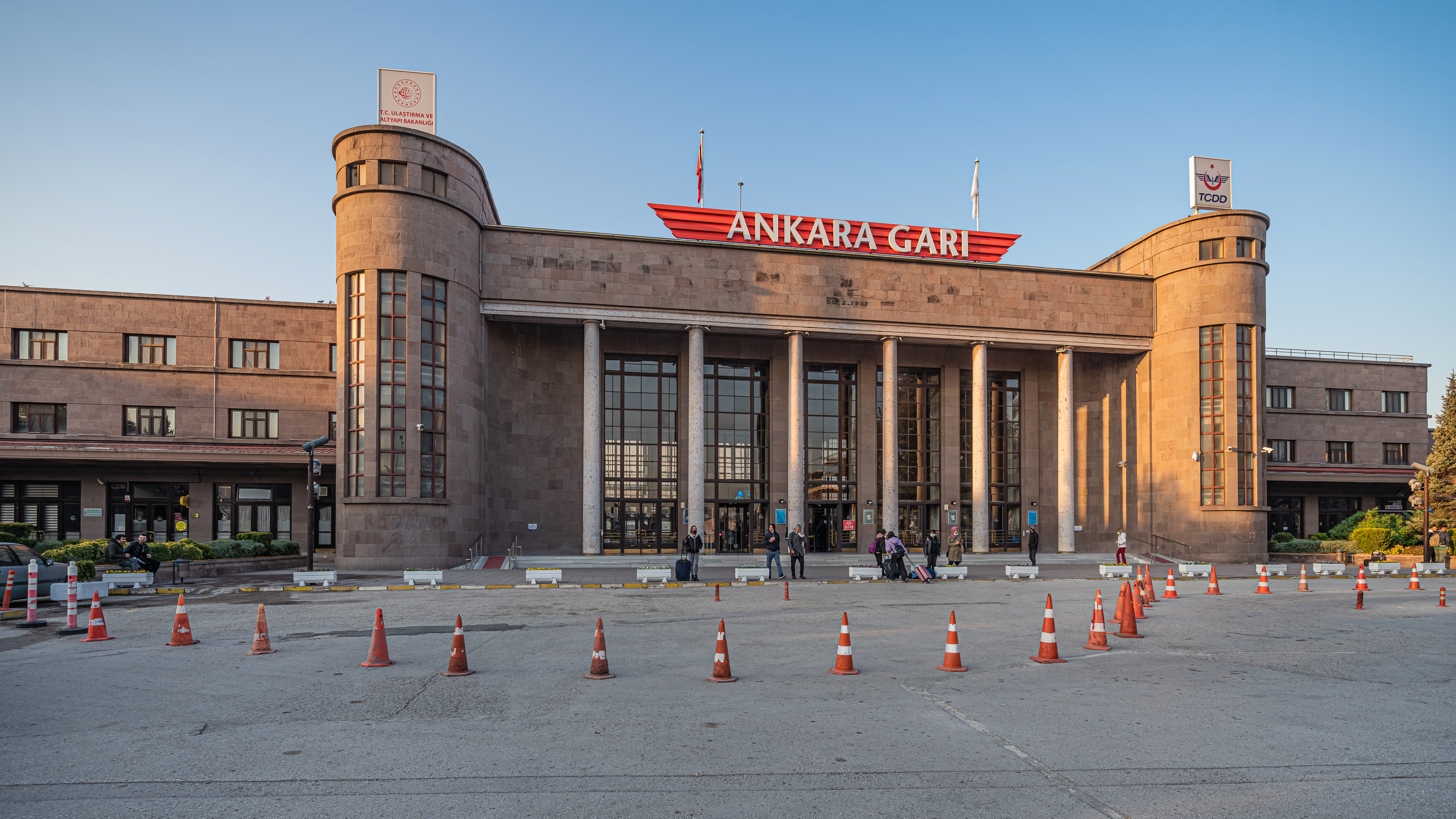
Ankara railway station is a hub for conventional trains.

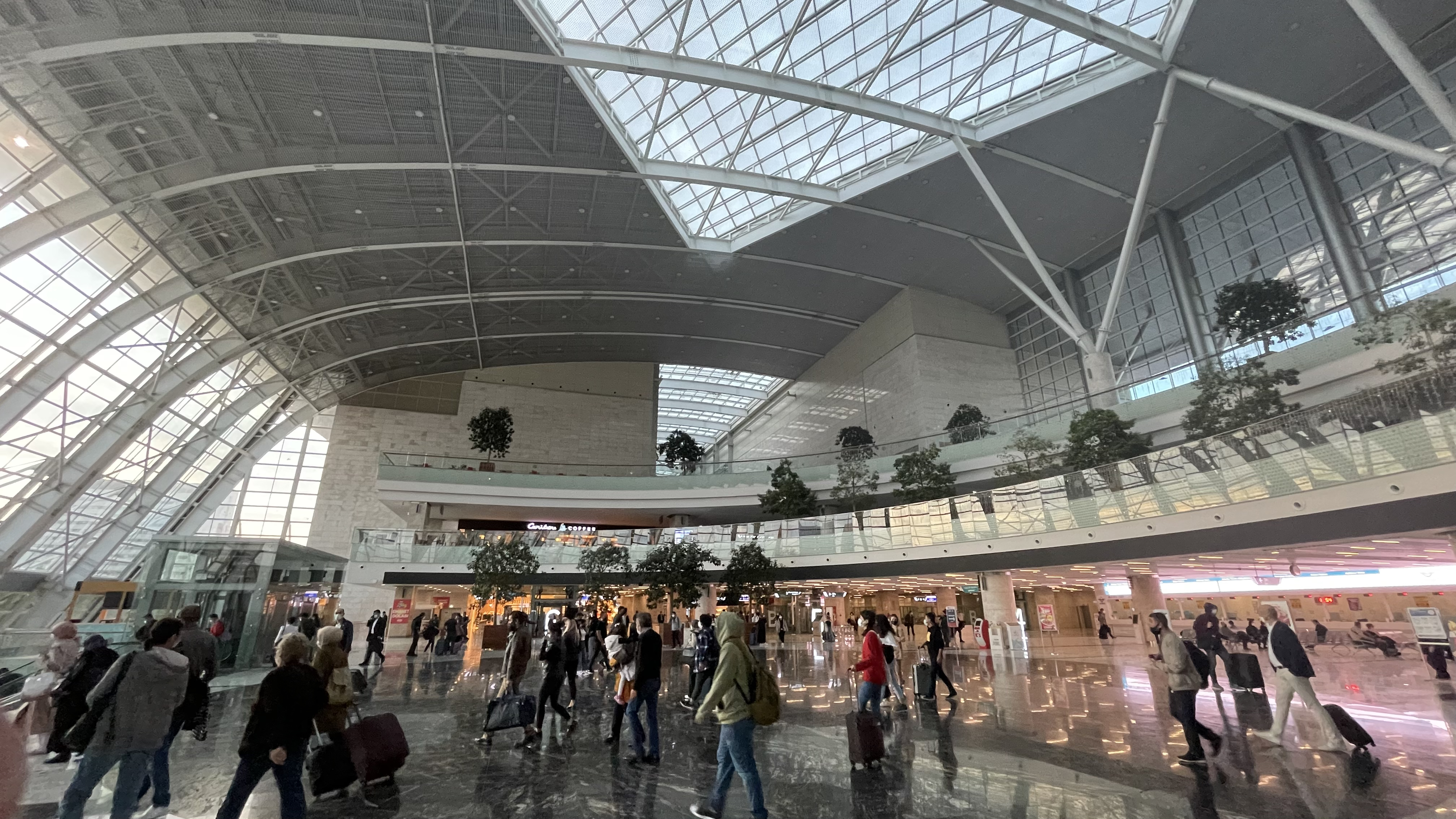
The new ATG terminal is a hub for the high-speed rail (YHT) services.

The Electricity, Gas, Bus General Directorate (EGO) operates the Ankara Metro and other forms of public transportation. Ankara is served by a suburban railway named Başkentray (B1), 1 light rail transit line named Ankaray (A1) and 2 Metro lines (M1-M2-M3, M4) of the Ankara Metro with about 400,000 total daily commuters, while additional lines (A2, M5, M6, M7, M8) are planned.

Ankara Central Station is a major rail hub in Turkey. The Turkish State Railways operates passenger train service from Ankara to other major cities, such as: Istanbul, Eskişehir, Balıkesir, Kütahya, İzmir, Kayseri, Adana, Kars, Elazığ, Malatya, Diyarbakır, Karabük, Zonguldak and Sivas. Commuter rail also runs between the stations of Sincan and Kayaş. On 13 March 2009, the new Yüksek Hızlı Tren (YHT) high-speed rail service began operation between Ankara and Eskişehir. On 23 August 2011, another YHT high-speed line commercially started its service between Ankara and Konya. On 25 July 2014, the Ankara–Istanbul high-speed line of YHT entered service.

Ankara Esenboğa Airport, located in the north-east of the city, is Ankara's main airport. Whilst the AŞTİ is the main coach terminal.

=== Ankara public transportation statistics ===
The average amount of time people spend commuting on public transit in Ankara on a weekday is 71 minutes. 17% of public transit passengers, ride for more than two hours every day. The average amount of time people wait at a stop or station for public transit is sixteen minutes, while 28% of users wait for over twenty minutes on average every day. The average distance people usually ride in a single trip with public transit is 9.9 km (6.2 mi), while 27% travel for over 12 km (7.5 mi) in a single direction.

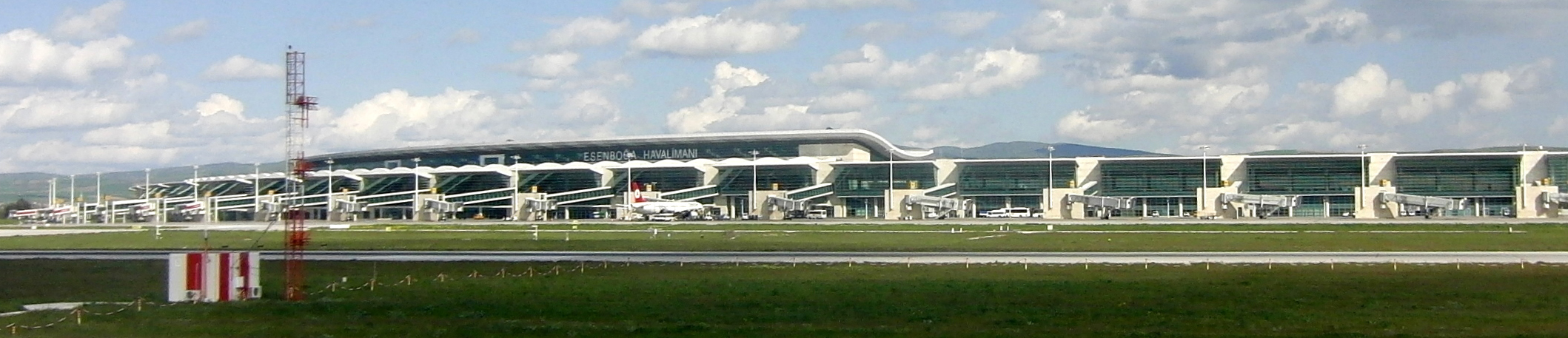
Esenboğa International Airport

== Politics ==

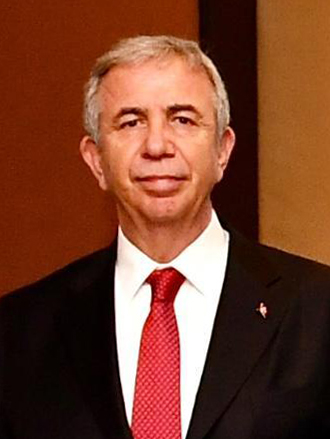
Mansur Yavaş of the CHP is the Mayor of Ankara.

Since 8 April 2019, the mayor of Ankara is Mansur Yavaş from the Republican People's Party (CHP), who won the mayoral election in 2019 and 2024.

Ankara is politically a triple battleground between the ruling conservative AK Party, the opposition Kemalist center-left Republican People's Party (CHP) and the nationalist far-right MHP. The province of Ankara is divided into 25 districts. Historically, the CHP's key and almost only political stronghold in Ankara lay within the central area of Çankaya, which is the city's most populous district. While the CHP has always gained between 60 and 70% of the vote in Çankaya since 2002, political support elsewhere throughout Ankara was minimal. The high population within Çankaya, as well as Yenimahalle to an extent, has allowed the CHP to take overall second place behind the AK Party in both local and general elections, with the MHP a close third, despite the fact that the MHP was politically stronger than the CHP in almost every other district. Overall, the AK Party enjoyed the most support throughout the city. The electorate of Ankara thus tended to vote in favor of the political right, far more so than the other main cities of Istanbul and İzmir. In retrospect, the 2013–14 protests against the AK Party government were particularly strong in Ankara, proving to be fatal on multiple occasions.

Ankara district Municipalities Local elections, 2024
- CHP: 16 / 25
- AK Party: 8 / 25
- Independent: 1 / 25

The city suffered from a series of terrorist attacks in 2015 and 2016, most notably on 10 October 2015; 17 February 2016; and 13 March 2016. The city was also one of the sites of the coup attempt on 15 July 2016.

Melih Gökçek was the Metropolitan Mayor of Ankara between 1994 and 2017. Initially elected in the 1994 local elections, he was re-elected in 1999, 2004 and 2009. In the 2014 local elections, Gökçek stood for a fifth term. The MHP's metropolitan mayoral candidate for the 2009 local elections, Mansur Yavaş, stood as the CHP's candidate against Gökçek in 2014. In a heavily controversial election, Gökçek was declared the winner by just 1% ahead of Yavaş amid allegations of systematic electoral fraud. With the Supreme Electoral Council and courts rejecting his appeals, Yavaş declared his intention to take the irregularities to the European Court of Human Rights. Although Gökçek was inaugurated for a fifth term, most election observers believe that Yavaş was the winner of the election. Gökçek resigned on 28 October 2017 and was replaced by the former mayor of Sincan district, Mustafa Tuna; who was succeeded by Mansur Yavaş of the CHP, the current mayor of Ankara, elected in 2019.

== Main sights ==
=== Ancient/archaeological sites ===
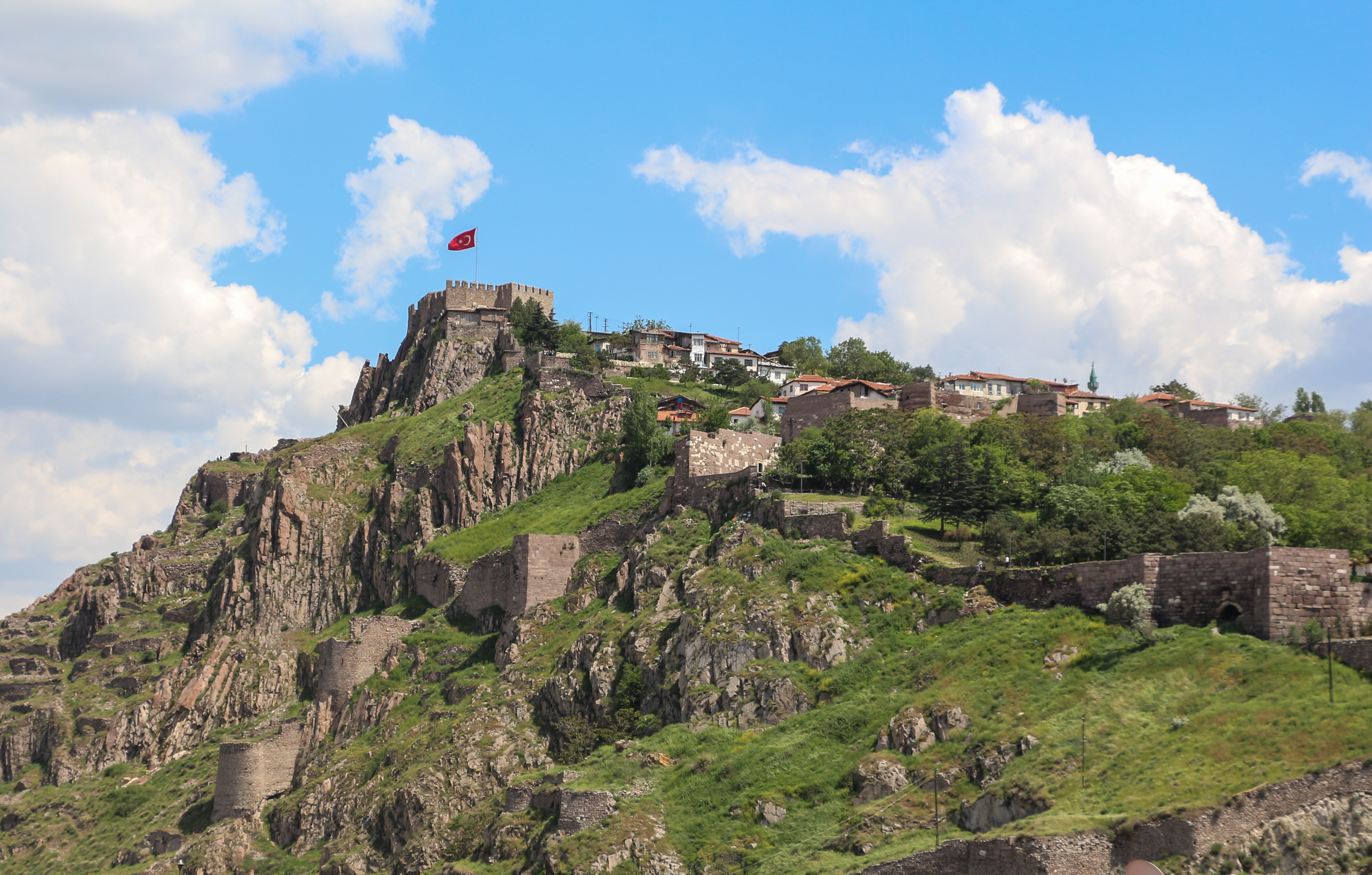
Ankara castle and citadel

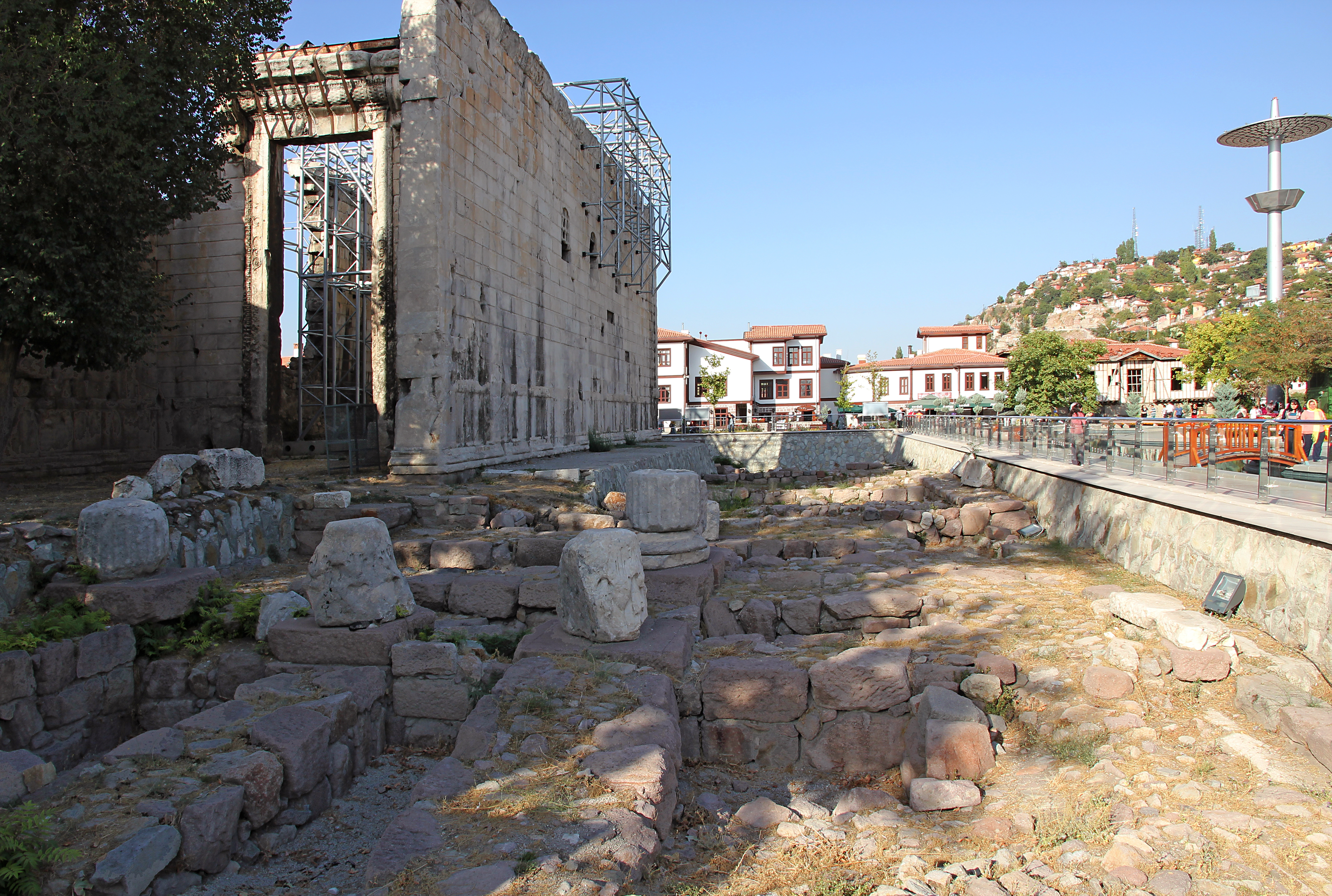
At the Monumentum Ancyranum (Temple of Augustus and Rome) in Ulus, the primary intact copy of Res Gestae written by the first Roman emperor Augustus survives.

The foundations of the Ankara castle and citadel were laid by the Galatians on a prominent lava outcrop (39.941°N 32.864°E), and the rest was completed by the Romans. The Byzantines and Seljuks further made restorations and additions. The area around and inside the citadel, being the oldest part of Ankara, contains many fine examples of traditional architecture. There are also recreational areas to relax. Many restored traditional Turkish houses inside the citadel area have found new life as restaurants, serving local cuisine. The citadel was depicted in various Turkish banknotes during 1927–1952 and 1983–1989.

The remains, the stage, and the backstage of the Antique Rome theatre of Ankara can be seen outside the castle. Roman statues that were found here are exhibited in the Museum of Anatolian Civilizations. The seating area is still under excavation.

The Augusteum, now known as the Temple of Augustus and Rome, was built 25 x 20 BC following the conquest of Central Anatolia by the Roman Empire. Ancyra then formed the capital of the new province of Galatia. After the death of Augustus in AD 14, a copy of the text of the Res Gestae Divi Augusti (the Monumentum Ancyranum) was inscribed on the interior of the temple's pronaos in Latin and a Greek translation on an exterior wall of the cella. The temple on the ancient acropolis of Ancyra was enlarged in the 2nd century and converted into a church in the 5th century. It is located in the Ulus quarter of the city. It was subsequently publicized by the Austrian ambassador Ogier Ghiselin de Busbecq in the 16th century.

The Roman Baths of Ankara have all the typical features of a classical Roman bath complex: a frigidarium (cold room), a tepidarium (warm room) and a caldarium (hot room). The baths were built during the reign of the Roman emperor Caracalla in the early 3rd century to honor Asclepios, the God of Medicine. Today, only the basement and first floors remain. It is situated in the Ulus quarter.

The Roman Road of Ankara or Cardo Maximus was found in 1995 by Turkish archaeologist Cevdet Bayburtluoğlu. It is 216 meters (709 feet) long and 6.7 meters (22.0 feet) wide. Many ancient artifacts were discovered during the excavations along the road and most of them are displayed at the Museum of Anatolian Civilizations.

The Column of Julian or Julianus, now in the Ulus district, was erected in honor of the Roman emperor Julian the Apostate's visit to Ancyra in 362.

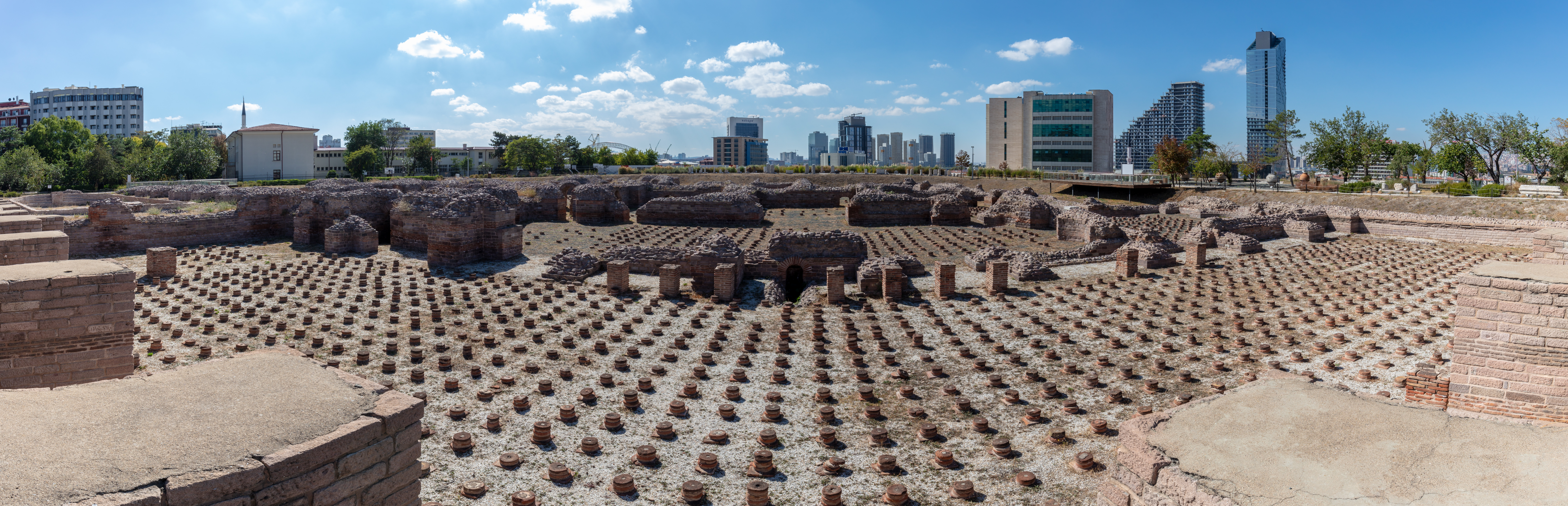
Roman Baths of Ankara

=== Mosques ===
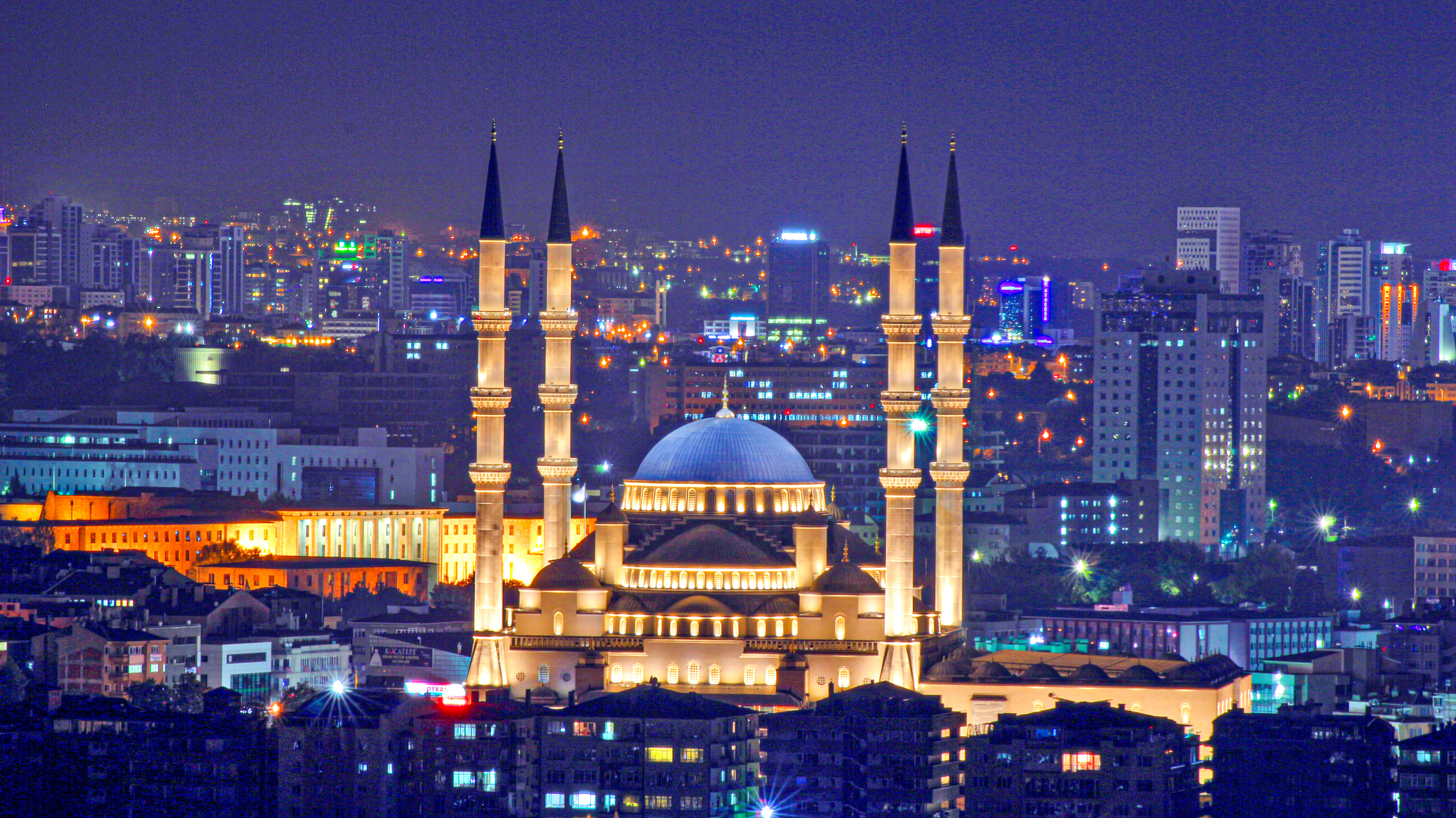

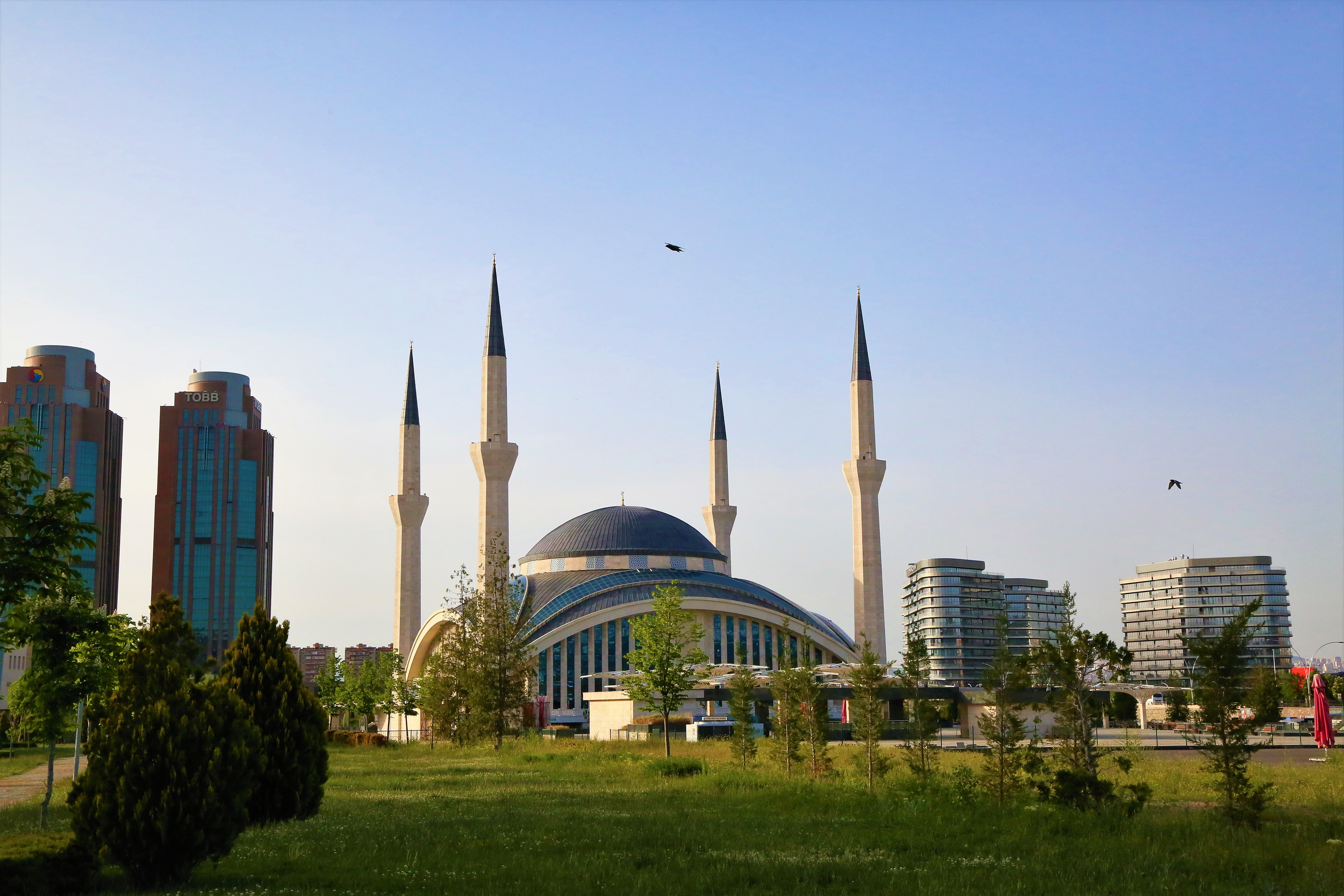
Top: Kocatepe Mosque (1987)
Bottom: Ahmet Hamdi Akseki Mosque (2013)

Kocatepe Mosque is the largest mosque in the city. Located in the Kocatepe quarter, it was constructed between 1967 and 1987 in classical Ottoman style with four minarets. Its size and prominent location have made it a landmark for the city.

Ahmet Hamdi Akseki Mosque is located near the Presidency of Religious Affairs on the Eskişehir Road. Built in the Turkish neoclassical style, it is one of the largest new mosques in the city, completed and opened in 2013. It can accommodate 6 thousand people during general prayers, and up to 30 thousand people during funeral prayers. The mosque was decorated with Anatolian Seljuk style patterns.

Yeni (Cenab Ahmet) Mosque is the largest Ottoman mosque in Ankara and was built by the famous architect Sinan in the 16th century. The mimber (pulpit) and mihrap (prayer niche) are of white marble, and the mosque itself is of Ankara stone, an example of very fine workmanship.

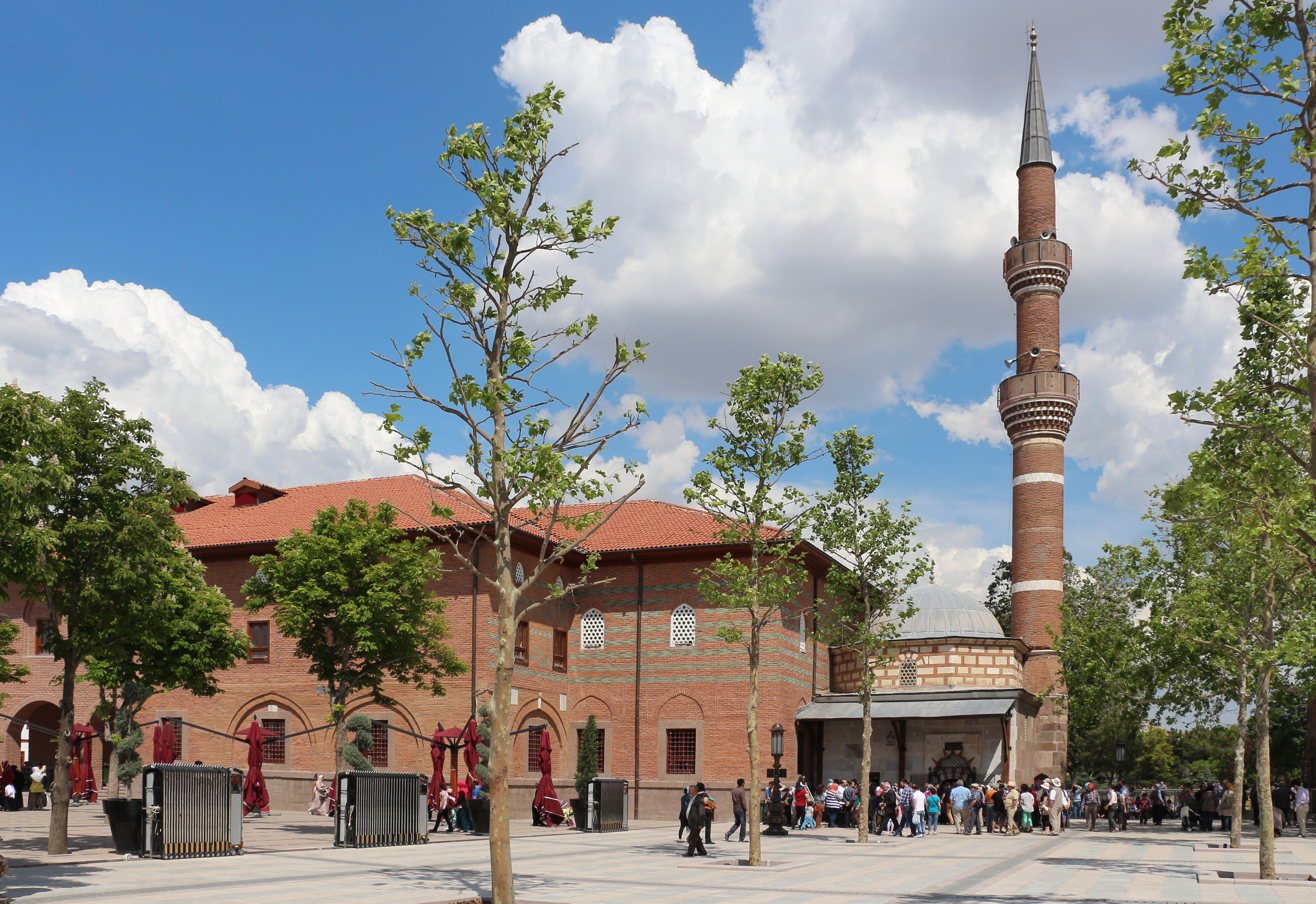
Hacı Bayram Mosque (1428)

Hacı Bayram Mosque, in the Ulus quarter next to the Temple of Augustus, was built in the early 15th century in Seljuk style by an unknown architect. It was subsequently restored by architect Mimar Sinan in the 16th century, with Kütahya tiles being added in the 18th century. The mosque was built in honor of Hacı Bayram-ı Veli, whose tomb is next to the mosque, two years before his death (1427–28). The usable space inside this mosque is 437 m^{2} (4,704 sq ft) on the first floor and 263 m^{2} (2,831 sq ft) on the second floor.

Ahi Elvan Mosque was founded in the Ulus quarter near the Ankara Citadel and was constructed by the Ahi fraternity during the late 14th and early 15th centuries. The finely carved walnut mimber (pulpit) is of particular interest.

The Alâeddin Mosque is the oldest mosque in Ankara. It has a carved walnut mimber, the inscription on which records that the mosque was completed in early AH 574 (which corresponds to the summer of 1178 AD) and was built by the Seljuk prince Muhiddin Mesud Şah (died 1204), the Bey of Ankara, who was the son of the Anatolian Seljuk sultan Kılıç Arslan II (reigned 1156–1192.)

=== Modern monuments ===
There are at least 50 monuments and reliefs throughout the city. Some notables are:

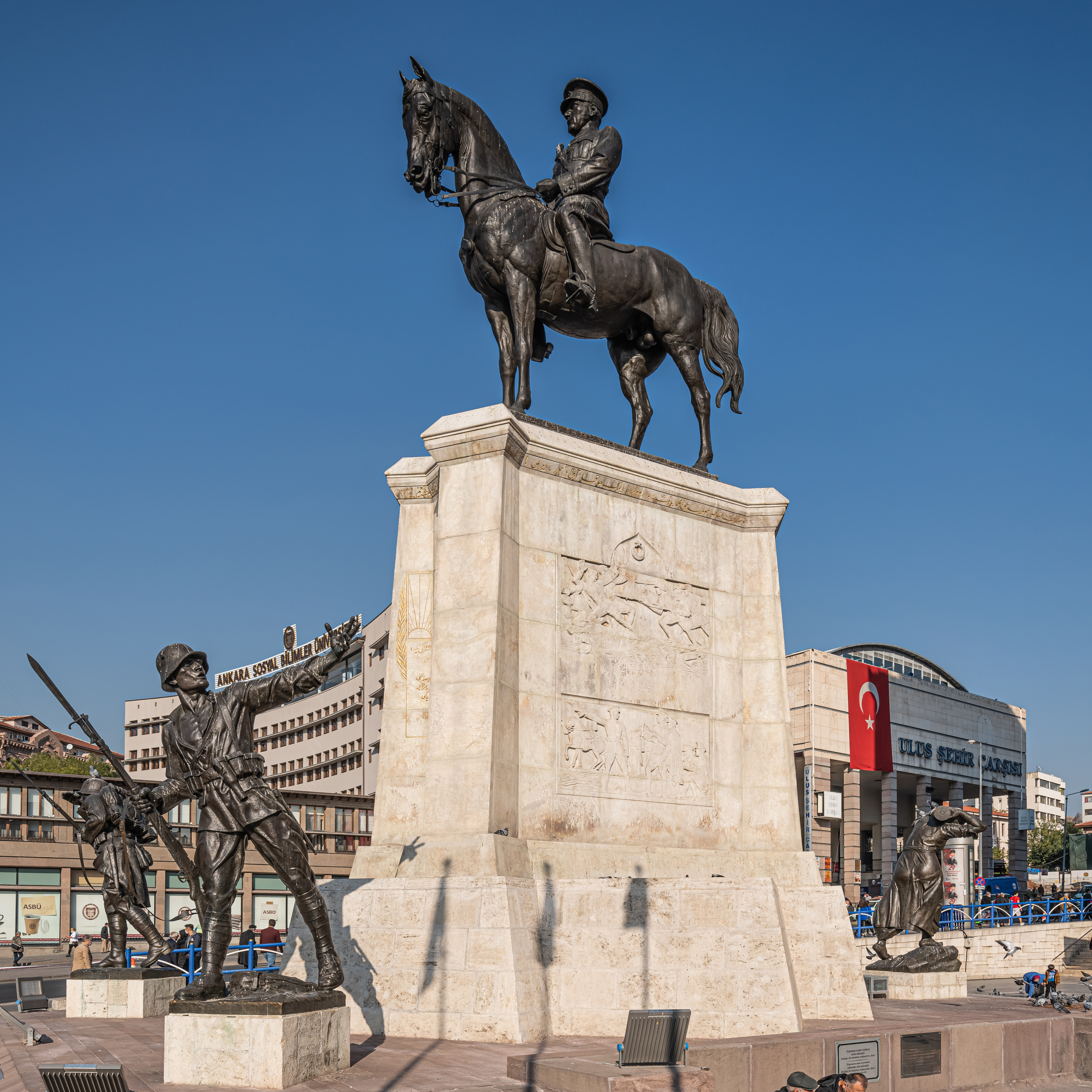

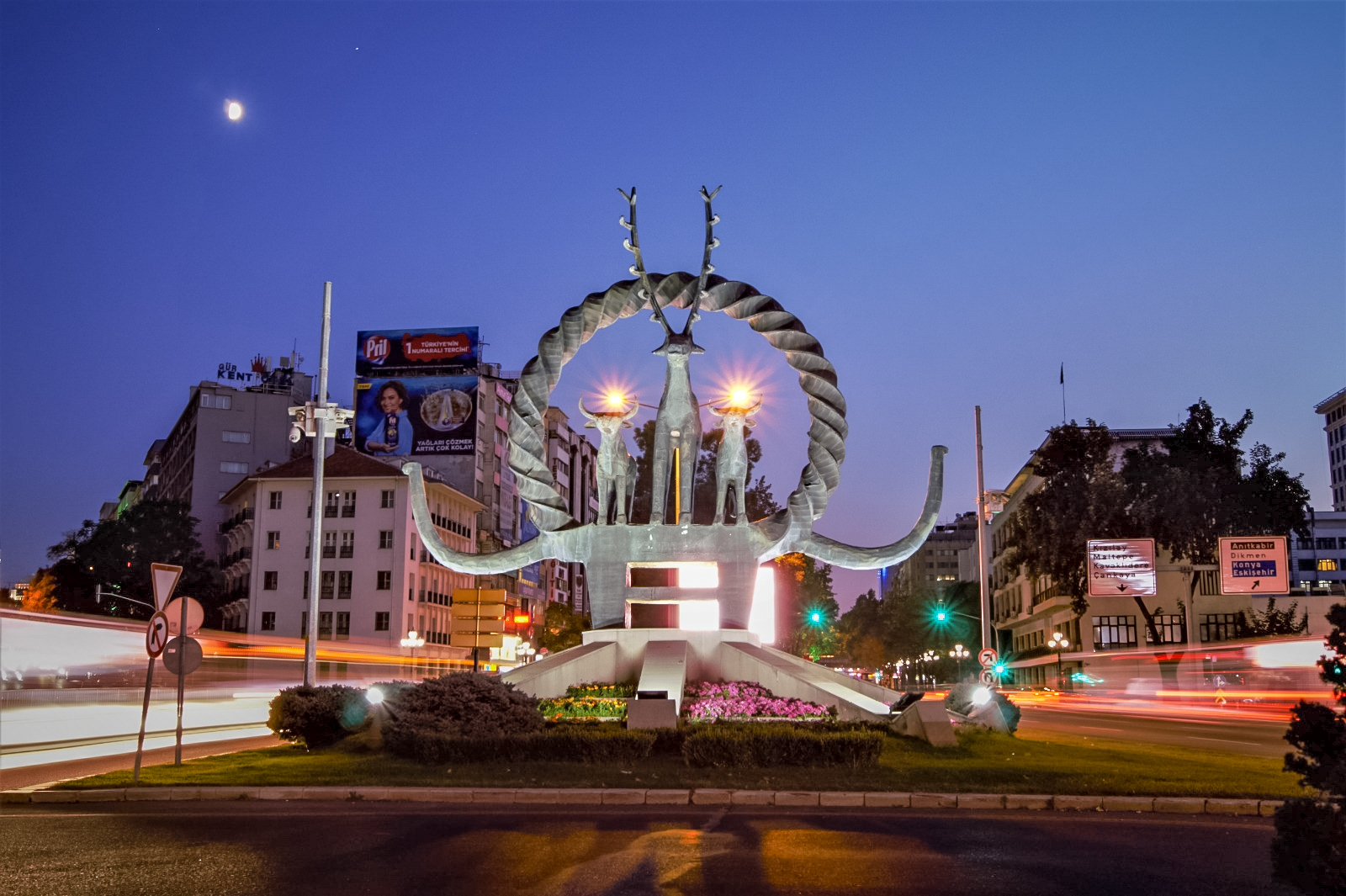
Top: Victory Monument (1927)
Bottom: Hittite Sun Course Monument (1978)

The Victory Monument (Turkish: Zafer Anıtı) was crafted by Austrian sculptor Heinrich Krippel in 1925 and was erected in 1927 at Ulus Square. The monument is made of marble and bronze and features an equestrian statue of Mustafa Kemal Atatürk, who wears a Republic era modern military uniform, with the rank Field Marshal.

Located at Zafer(Victory) Square (Turkish: Zafer Meydanı), the marble and bronze Statue of Atatürk was crafted by the Italian sculptor Pietro Canonica in 1927 and depicts a standing Atatürk who wears a Republic era modern military uniform, with the rank Field Marshal.

The Security Monument, located in Güvenpark near Kızılay Square, was erected in 1935 and bears Atatürk's advice to his people: "Turk! Be proud, work hard, and believe in yourself." (There is debate on whether or not Atatürk actually said "Use your mind"(Turkish: öğün) instead of "Be proud"(Turkish: övün))

The monument was depicted on the reverse of the Turkish 5 lira banknote of 1937–1952 and of the 1000 lira banknotes of 1939–1946.

Erected in 1978 at Sıhhiye Square, the Hatti Monument impressive monument symbolizes the Hatti Sun Disc (which was later adopted by the Hittites) and commemorates Anatolia's earliest known civilization. The Hatti Sun Disc has been used in the previous logo of Ankara Metropolitan Municipality. It was also used in the previous logo of the Ministry of Culture & Tourism.

The Monument to Turkish Soldiers Fighting in Korea opened in 1973 to commemorate the veterans and martyrs of the Turkish Brigade.

=== Inns ===
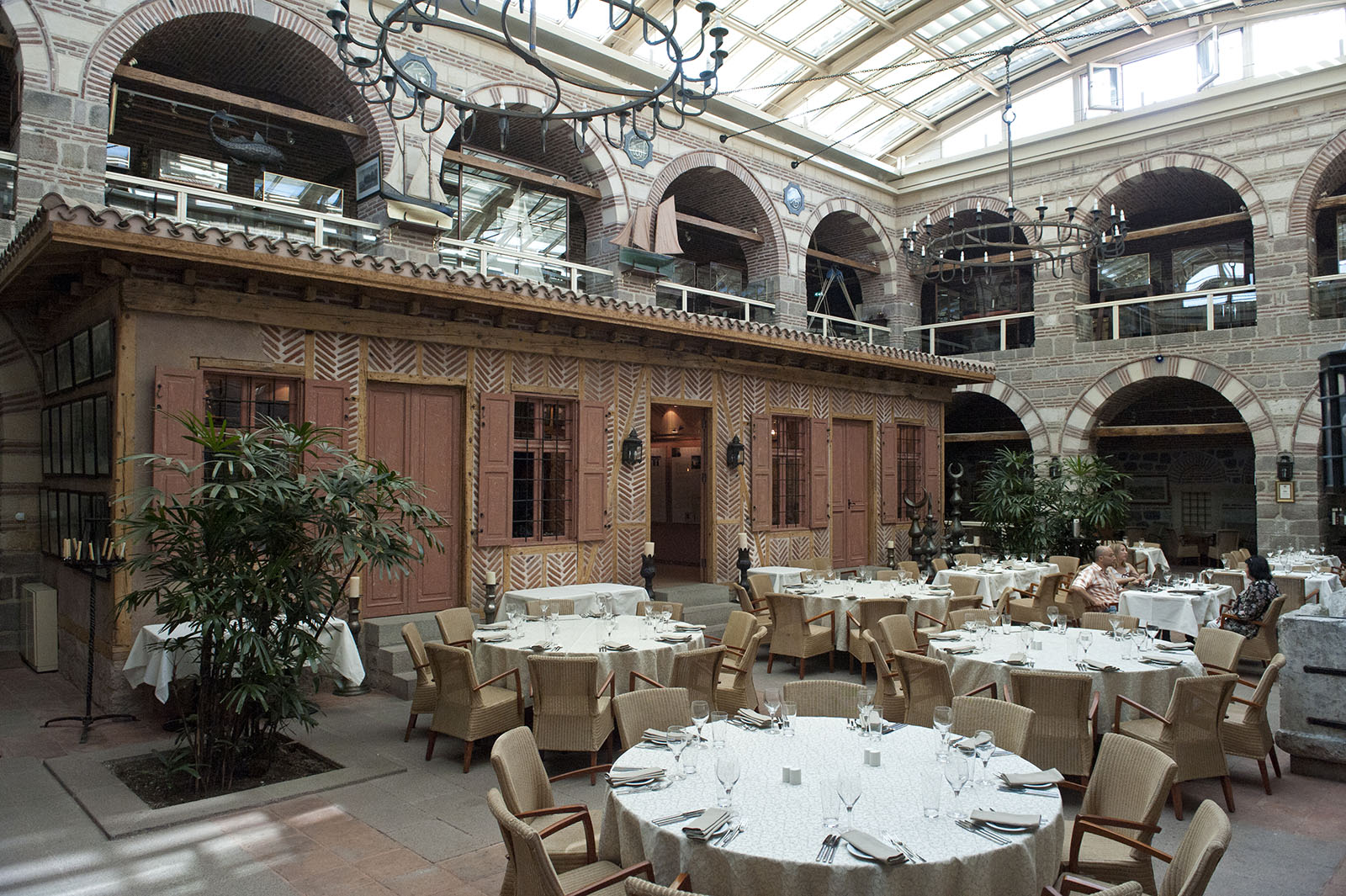
Çengelhan Rahmi M. Koç Museum's courtyard has been covered with a glass roof.

Suluhan is a historical Inn in Ankara. It is also called the Hasanpaşa Han. It is about 400 meters (1,300 ft) southeast of Ulus Square and situated in the Hacıdoğan neighborhood. According to the vakfiye (inscription) of the building, the Ottoman era han was commissioned by Hasan Pasha, a regional beylerbey, and was constructed between 1508 and 1511, during the final years of the reign of Sultan Bayezid II. There are 102 rooms (now shops) which face the two yards. In each room there is a window, a niche and a chimney.

Çengelhan Rahmi M. Koç Museum is a museum of industrial technology situated in Çengel Han, an Ottoman era Inn which was completed in 1523, during the early years of the reign of Sultan Suleiman the Magnificent. The exhibits include industrial/technological artifacts from the 1850s onwards. There are also sections about Mustafa Kemal Atatürk, the founder of modern Turkey; Vehbi Koç, Rahmi Koç's father and one of the first industrialists of Turkey, and Ankara city.

== Shopping ==
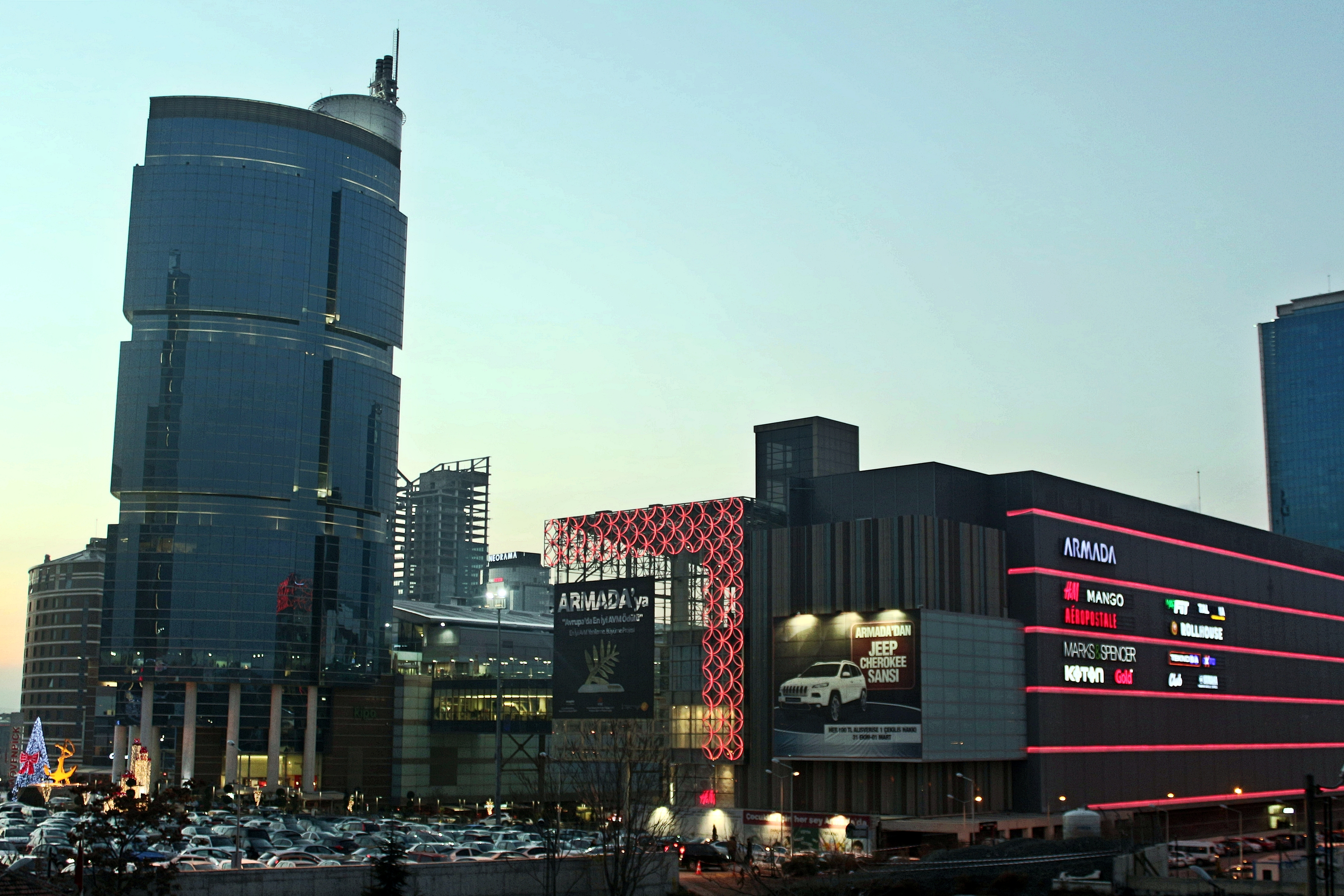
Armada Shopping Mall

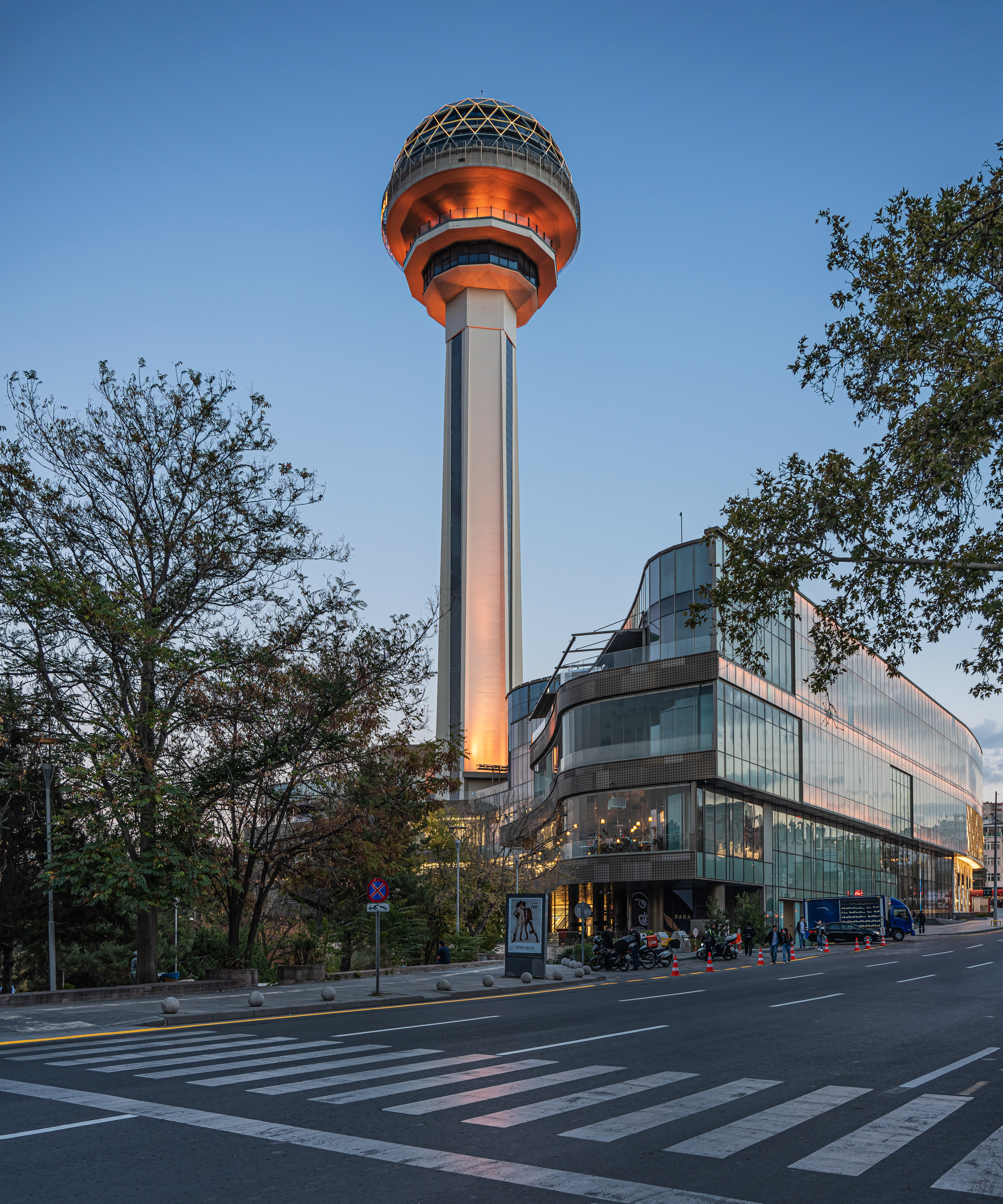
Atakule Tower and Atrium Shopping Mall

Modern shopping areas are mostly found in Kızılay, or on Tunalı Hilmi Avenue, including the modern mall of Karum (named after the ancient Assyrian merchant colonies called Kârum that were established in central Anatolia at the beginning of the 2nd millennium BC) which is located towards the end of the Avenue; and in Çankaya, the quarter with the highest elevation in the city. Atakule Tower next to Atrium Mall in Çankaya has views over Ankara and also has a revolving restaurant at the top. The symbol of the Armada Shopping Mall is an anchor, and there is a large anchor monument at its entrance, as a reference to the ancient Greek name of the city, Ἄγκυρα (Ánkyra), which means anchor. Likewise, the anchor monument is also related with the Spanish name of the mall, Armada, which means naval fleet.

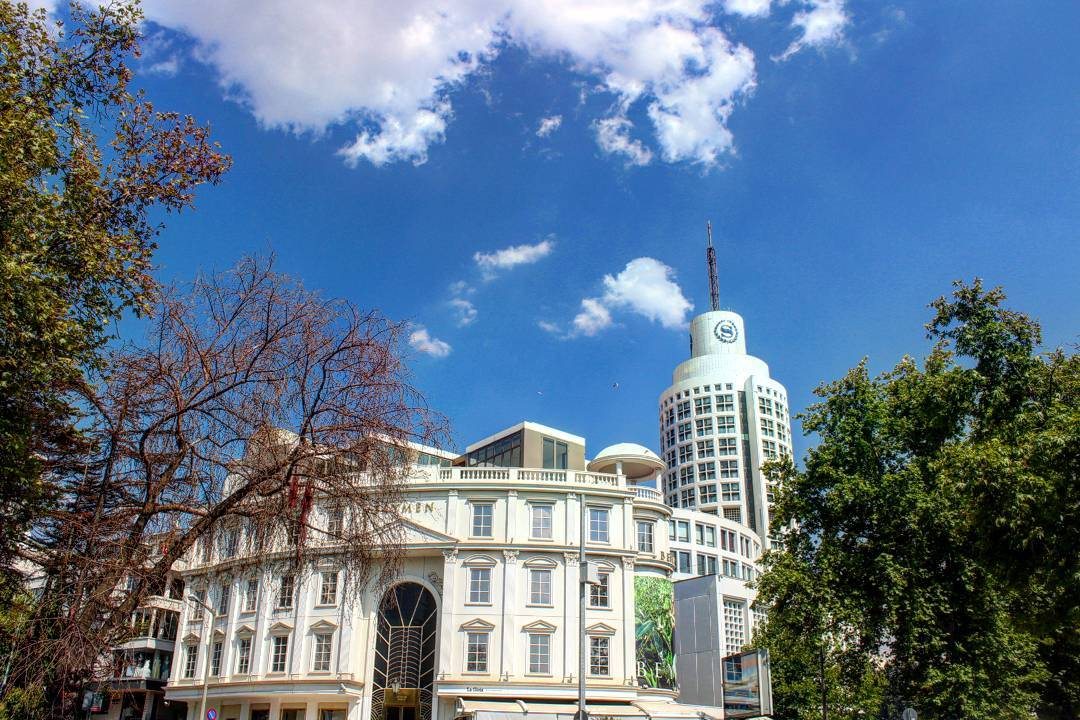
Sheraton Ankara and Karum Shopping Mall

As Ankara started expanding westward in the 1970s, several modern, suburbia-style developments, mini-cities and business districts such as Söğütözü began to rise along the western highway, also known as the Eskişehir Road. The Armada, CEPA and Kentpark malls on the highway, the Galleria, Arcadium and Gordion in Ümitköy, and a huge mall, Real in Bilkent Center, offer North American and European style shopping opportunities (these places can be reached through the Eskişehir Highway.) There is also the newly expanded ANKAmall at the outskirts, on the Istanbul Highway, which houses most of the well-known international brands. This mall is the largest throughout the Ankara region. In 2014, a few more shopping malls were open in Ankara. They are Next Level and Taurus on the Boulevard of Mevlana (also known as Konya Road).

== Culture ==
=== The arts ===
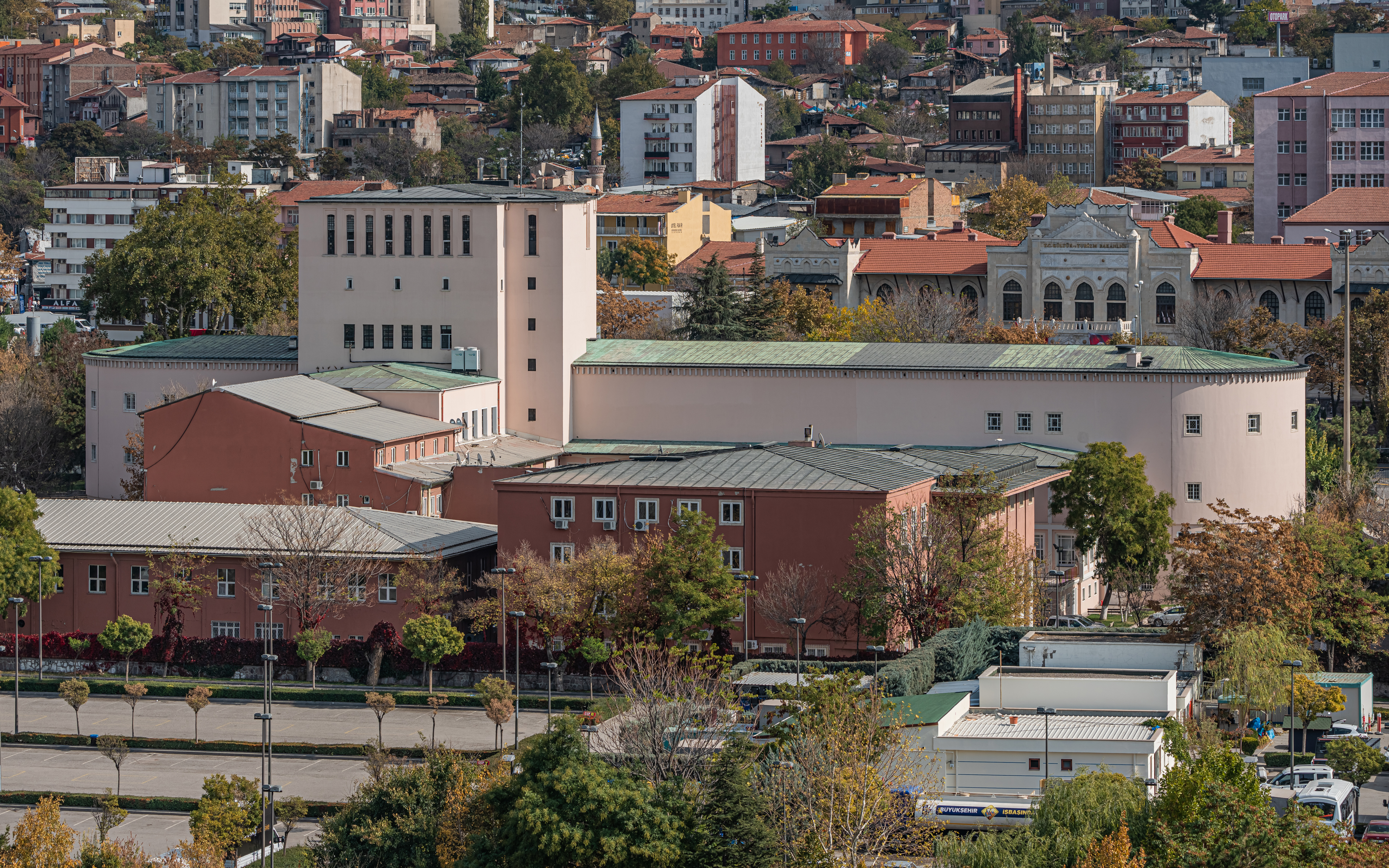
Ankara Opera House of the Turkish State Opera and Ballet (1933)

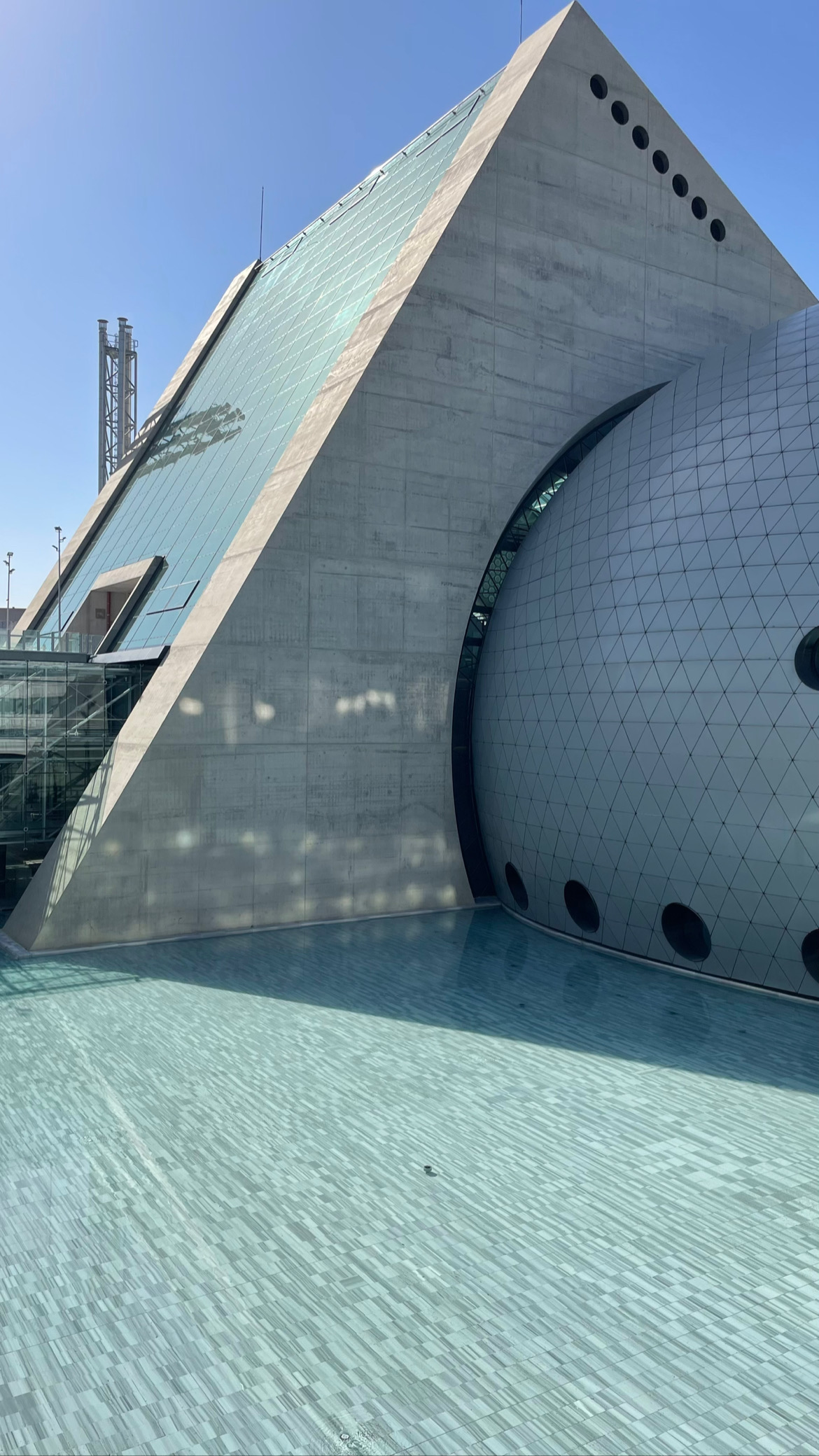
CSO Ada Ankara serves as the Presidential Symphony Orchestra Concert Hall.

Turkish State Opera and Ballet, the national directorate of opera and ballet companies of Turkey, has its headquarters in Ankara, and serves the city with three venues:

- Ankara Opera House (Opera Sahnesi, also known as Büyük Tiyatro) is the largest of the three venues for opera and ballet in Ankara.

==== Music ====
Ankara is host to five classical music orchestras:

- Presidential Symphony Orchestra (Turkish Presidential Symphony Orchestra)
- Bilkent Symphony Orchestra (BSO) is a major symphony orchestra of Turkey.
- Hacettepe Symphony Orchestra was founded in 2003 and directed by Erol Erdinç
- Başkent Oda Orkestrası (Chamber Orchestra of the Capital)

There are four concert halls in the city:

- CSO Concert Hall
- Bilkent Concert Hall is a performing arts center in Ankara. It is located in the Bilkent University campus.
- MEB Şura Salonu (also known as the Festival Hall), It is noted for its tango performances.
- Çankaya Çağdaş Sanatlar Merkezi Concert Hall was founded in 1994.

The city has been host to several well-established, annual theater, music, film festivals:

- Ankara International Music Festival, a music festival organized in the Turkish capital presenting classical music and ballet programs.

Ankara also has a number of concert venues such as Eskiyeni, IF Performance Hall, Jolly Joker, Kite, Nefes Bar, and Route, which host the live performances and events of popular musicians.

==== Theater ====
The Turkish State Theatres also has its head office in Ankara and runs the following stages in the city:

- 125. Yıl Çayyolu Sahnesi
- Büyük Tiyatro,
- Küçük Tiyatro,
- Şinasi Sahnesi,
- Akün Sahnesi,
- Altındağ Tiyatrosu,
- İrfan Şahinbaş Atölye Sahnesi,
- Oda Tiyatrosu,
- Mahir Canova Sahnesi,
- Muhsin Ertuğrul Sahnesi.

In addition, the city is served by several private theater companies, among which Ankara Sanat Tiyatrosu, who have their own stage in the city center, is a notable example.

=== Museums ===
There are about 50 museums in the city. Some notables include;

==== Museum of Anatolian Civilizations ====
The Museum of Anatolian Civilizations (Anadolu Medeniyetleri Müzesi) is situated at the entrance of the Ankara Castle. It is an old 15th century bedesten (covered bazaar) that has been restored and now houses a collection of Paleolithic, Neolithic, Hatti, Hittite, Phrygian, Urartian and Roman works as well as a major section dedicated to Lydian treasures.

==== Anıtkabir ====
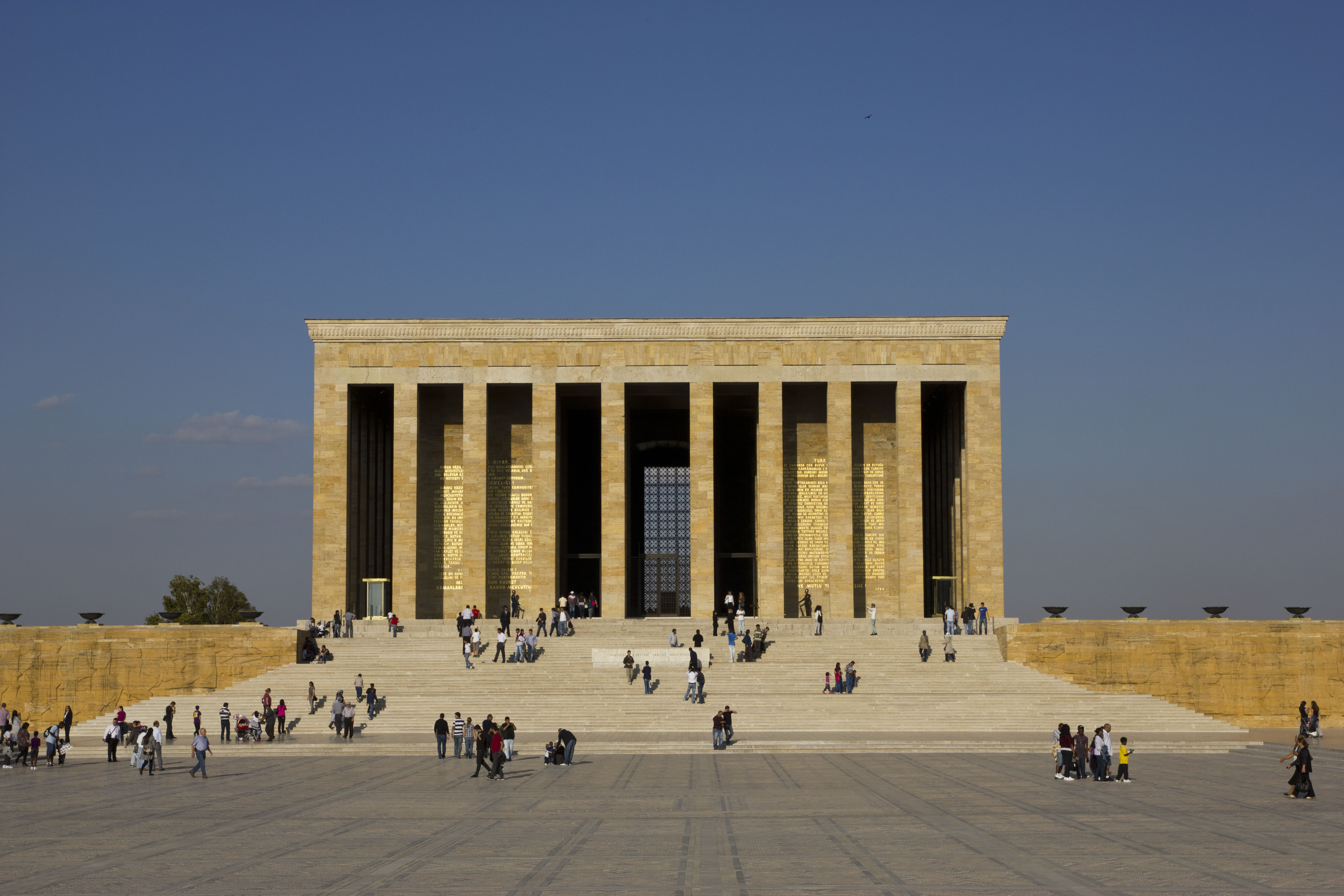
Atatürk's Mausoleum is the mausoleum of Mustafa Kemal Atatürk, founder of the Republic of Turkey.

Anıtkabir is located on an imposing hill, which forms the Anıttepe quarter of the city, where the mausoleum of Mustafa Kemal Atatürk, founder of the Republic of Turkey, stands. Completed in 1953, it is a fusion of ancient and modern architectural styles. An adjacent museum houses a wax statue of Atatürk, his writings, letters and personal items, as well as an exhibition of photographs recording important moments in his life and during the establishment of the Republic. Anıtkabir is open every day, while the adjacent museum is open every day except Mondays.

==== Ankara Aviation Museum ====
Ankara Aviation Museum (Hava Kuvvetleri Müzesi Komutanlığı) is located near the Istanbul Road in Etimesgut. The museum opened to the public in September 1998. It is home to various missiles, avionics, aviation materials and aircraft that have served in the Turkish Air Force (e.g. combat aircraft such as the F-86 Sabre, F-100 Super Sabre, F-102 Delta Dagger, F-104 Starfighter, F-5 Freedom Fighter, F-4 Phantom; and cargo planes such as the Transall C-160.) Also a Hungarian MiG-21, a Pakistani MiG-19, and a Bulgarian MiG-17 are on display at the museum.

==== Cermodern ====
Cermodern is the modern-arts museum of Ankara, inaugurated on 1 April 2010. It is situated in the renovated building of the historic TCDD Cer Atölyeleri, formerly a workshop of the Turkish State Railways. The museum incorporates the largest exhibition hall in Turkey. The museum holds periodic exhibitions of modern and contemporary art as well as hosting other contemporary arts events.

==== Ankara Ethnography Museum ====
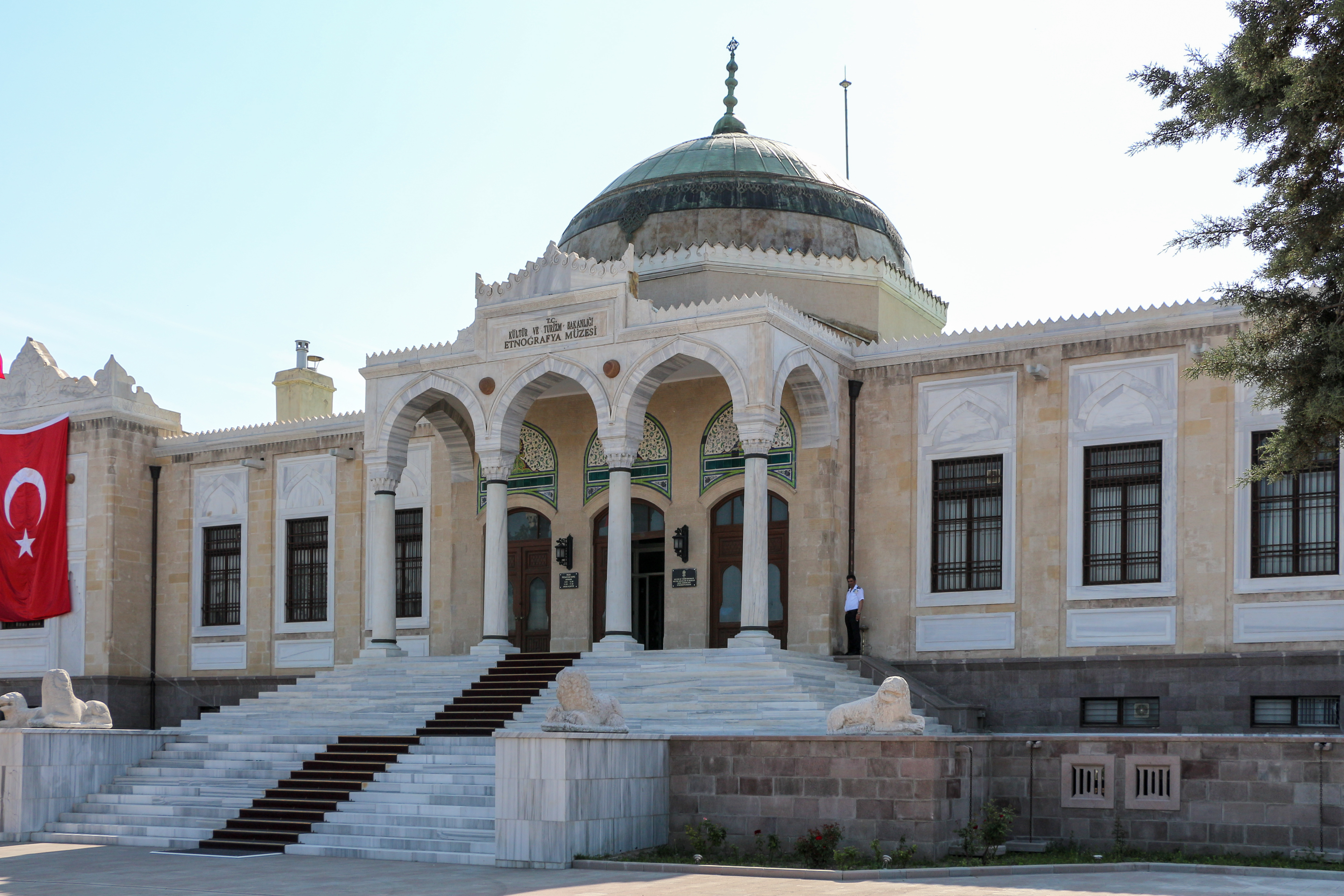
Ethnography Museum of Ankara

Ankara Ethnography Museum (Etnografya Müzesi) is located opposite to the Ankara Opera House on Talat Paşa Boulevard, in the Ulus district. There is a fine collection of folkloric items, as well as artifacts from the Seljuk and Ottoman periods. In front of the museum building, there is a marble and bronze equestrian statue of Mustafa Kemal Atatürk (who wears a Republic era modern military uniform, with the rank Field Marshal) which was crafted in 1927 by the Italian sculptor Pietro Canonica.

==== Mehmet Akif Literature Museum Library ====
The Mehmet Akif Literature Museum Library is an important literary museum and archive opened in 2011 and dedicated to Mehmet Akif Ersoy (1873–1936), the poet of the Turkish National Anthem.

==== METU Science and Technology Museum / Archaeology Museum ====
Both the METU Science and Technology Museum (ODTÜ Bilim ve Teknoloji Müzesi) and the Archaeology Museum (ODTÜ Arkeoloji Müzesi) are located inside the Middle East Technical University campus.

==== Republic & War of Independence Museum ====
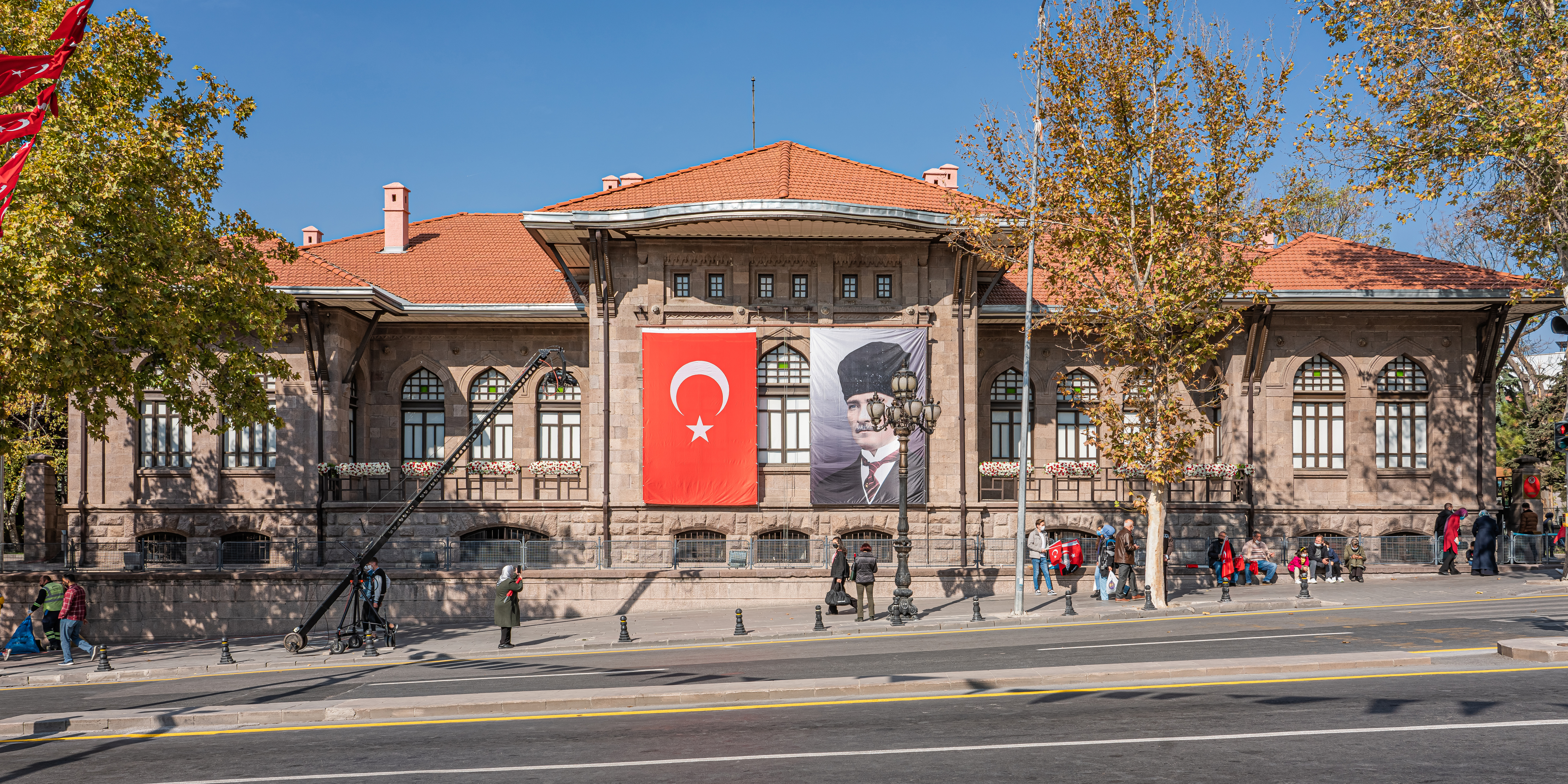
The War of Independence Museum, used as the first Turkish Grand National Assembly building

Both the Republic Museum and War of Independence Museum are located on Ulus Square. They were originally the first and second Parliament building (TBMM) of the Republic of Turkey, respectively. The War of Independence was planned and directed here as recorded in various photographs and items presently on exhibition. In another display, wax figures of former presidents of the Republic of Turkey are on exhibit.

==== State Art and Sculpture Museum ====
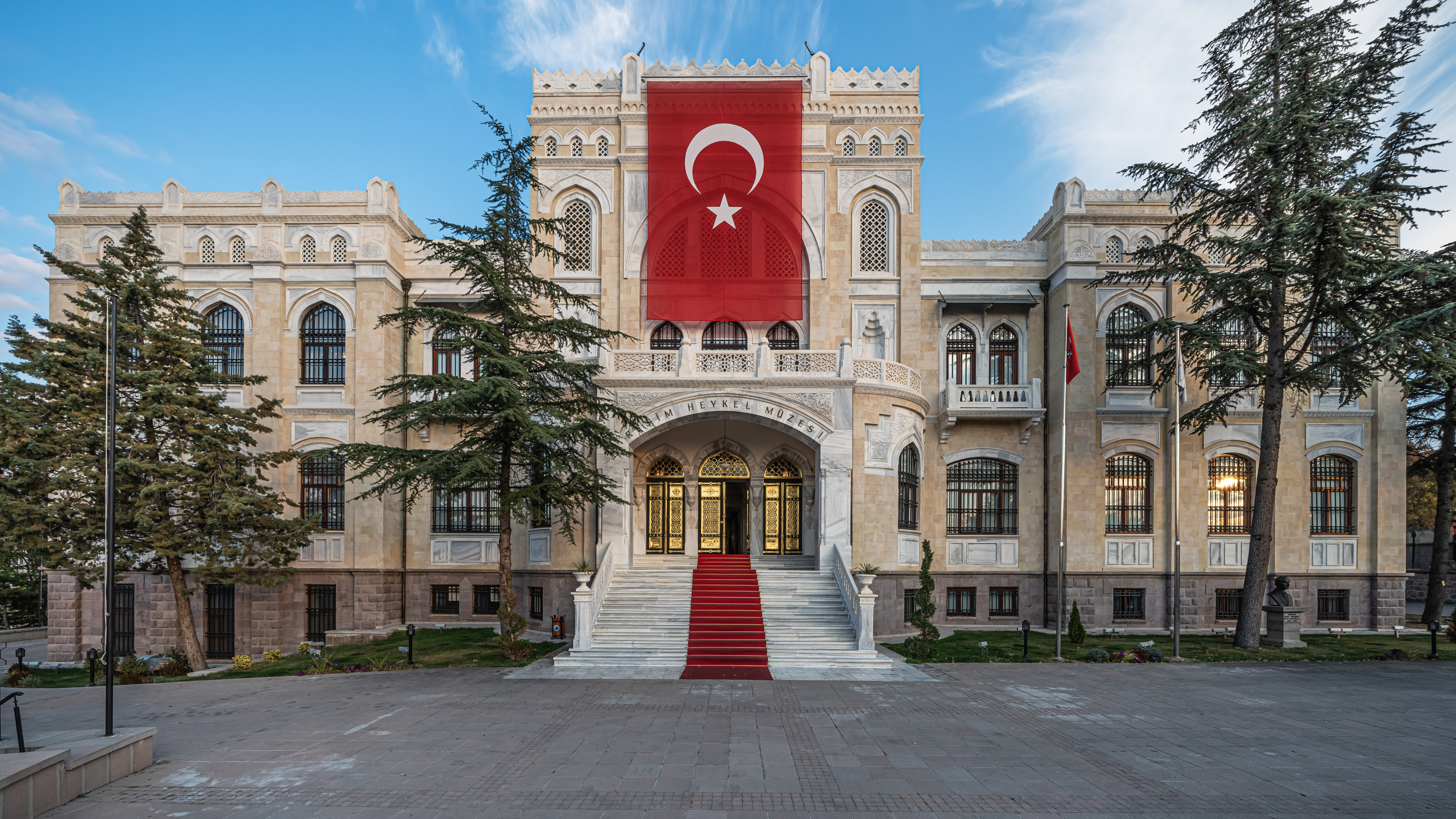
State Art and Sculpture Museum

The State Art and Sculpture Museum (Resim-Heykel Müzesi) which opened to the public in 1980 is close to the Ethnography Museum and houses a rich collection of Turkish art from the late 19th century to the present day. There are also galleries which host guest exhibitions.

==== TCDD Open Air Steam Locomotive Museum ====
The TCDD Open Air Steam Locomotive Museum is an open-air museum which traces the history of steam locomotives.

=== Art Galleries ===
There are two well-established art galleries in Ankara: Galeri Nev and Siyah Beyaz.

==== Galeri Nev ====
Galeri Nev is a long-established art gallery based in Ankara, Turkey. Founded in 1984, it has hosted numerous exhibitions and contributed to the development of contemporary art in Turkey.

==== Galeri Siyah Beyaz ====
Galeri Siyah Beyaz is a well-known art gallery founded in 1984 in Ankara, Turkey. The gallery showcases modern and contemporary artworks and hosts both solo and group exhibitions.

=== Sports ===
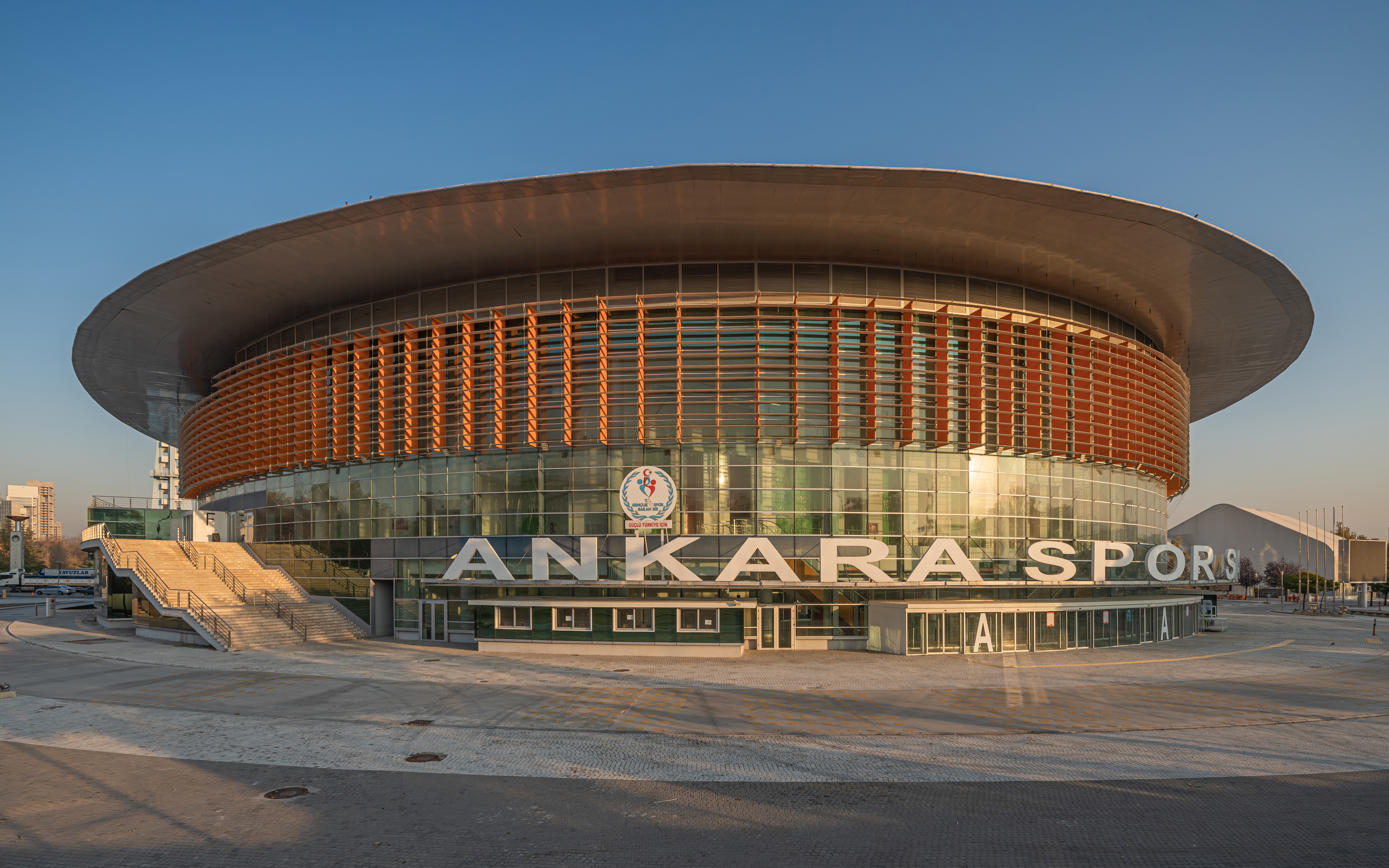
Ankara Arena

As with all other cities of Turkey, football is the most popular sport in Ankara. The city currently has one football club competing in the top flight of Turkish football, Gençlerbirliği. Ankara Keçiörengücü currently compete in the second tier of Turkish football, the TFF First League. Ankaragücü, founded in 1910, currently compete in the third tier, the TFF Second League. Ankaragücü are the oldest club in Ankara and are associated with Ankara's military arsenal manufacturing company MKE. They were the Turkish Cup winners in 1972 and 1981. Gençlerbirliği, founded in 1923, are known as the Ankara Gale or the Poppies because of their colors: red and black. They were the Turkish Cup winners in 1987 and 2001. Ankara Keçiörengücü also compete in this tier. They were founded in 1987, and bear purple and white colours on their home kit. Büyükşehir Belediye Ankaraspor also played in the Süper Lig until 2010, when they were expelled. The club was reconstituted in 2014 as Osmanlıspor but have since returned to their old identity as Ankaraspor. Ankaraspor currently play in the TFF Second League at the Etimesgut Belediyesi Atatürk Stadium. Gençlerbirliği's B team, Hacettepe S.K. (formerly known as Gençlerbirliği OFTAŞ) played in the Süper Lig but folded in 2023. Ankara Demirspor and Etimesgut Belediyespor also play in the TFF Second League. Ankara has a large number of minor teams, playing at regional levels, including Çankaya FK, Altındağspor, Mamak FK, Çubukspor, and Bağlumspor.

In the Turkish Basketball Super League, Ankara is represented by Türk Telekom B.K., who play at the Ankara Arena. TED Ankara Kolejliler, MKE Ankaragücü, and OGM Ormanspor play in the second-tier Turkish First League. Türk Telekom became the fourth team in the country's history to participate in EuroCup finals (22-23).

Halkbank Ankara is the leading domestic powerhouse in men's volleyball, having won many championships and cups in the Turkish Men's Volleyball League and even the CEV Cup in 2013.

Ankara Buz Pateni Sarayı is where the ice skating and ice hockey competitions take place in the city.

There are many popular spots for skateboarding which is active in the city since the 1980s. Skaters in Ankara usually meet in the park near the Grand National Assembly of Turkey.

=== Handball ===
The 2012-built THF Sport Hall hosts the Handball Super League and Women's Handball Super League matches scheduled in Ankara.

The women's handball teams Yenimahalle Bld. and Ankara Yurdum compete in the Super League.

== Parks ==
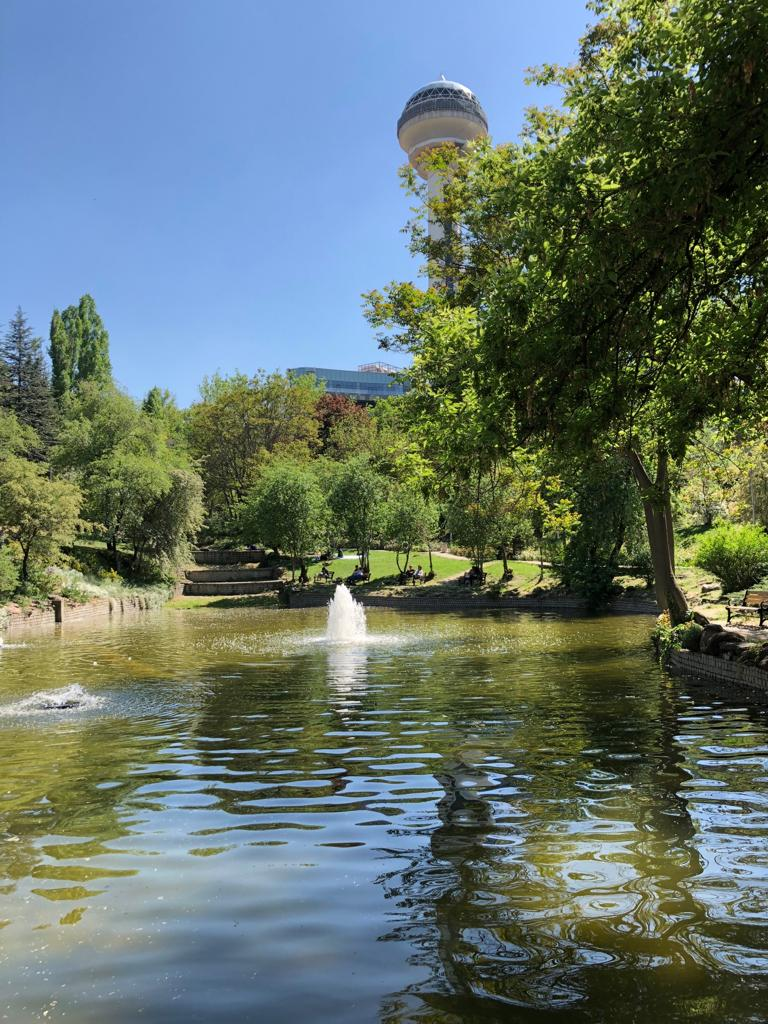
Botanik Park

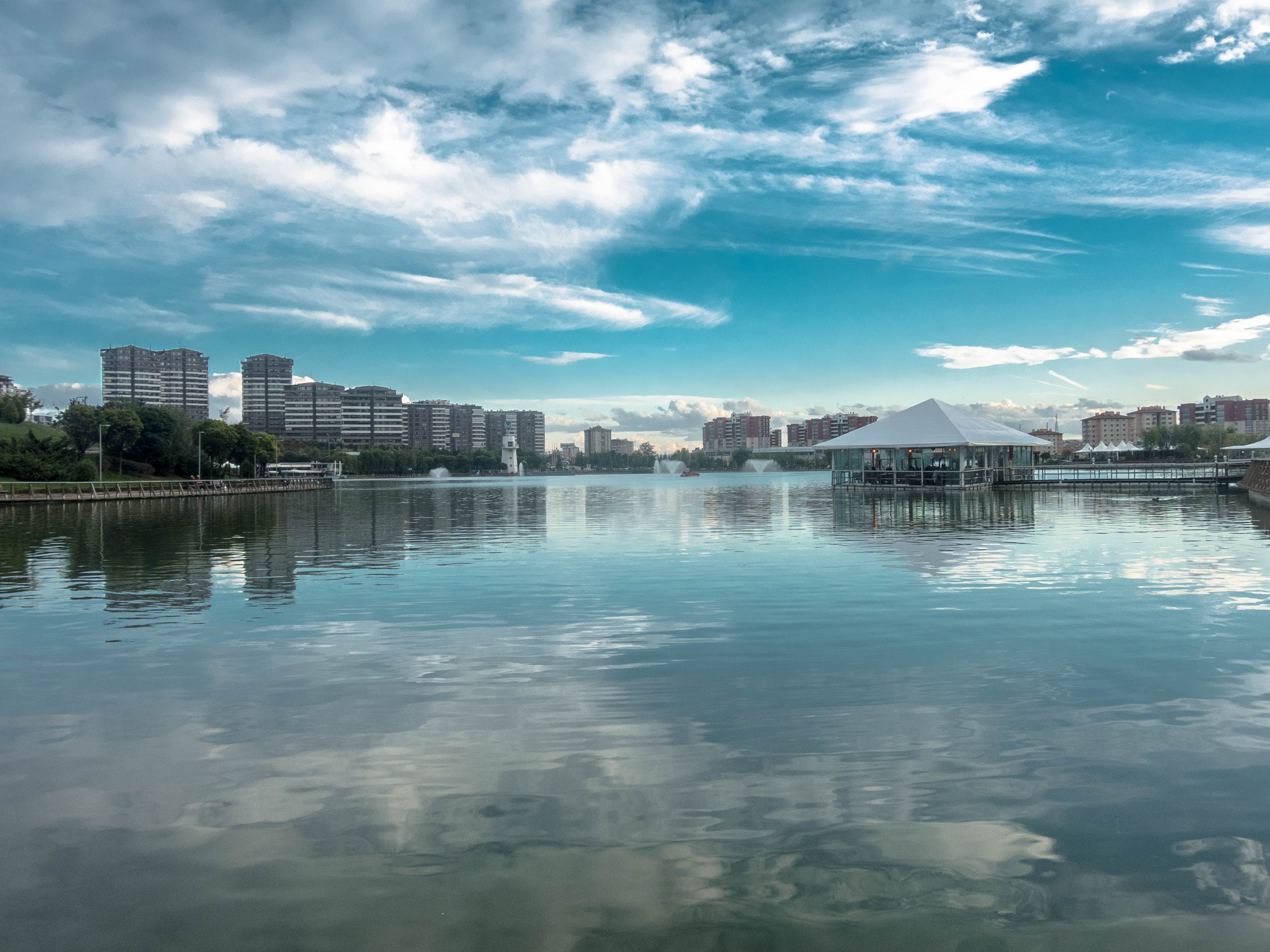
Göksu Park

Ankara has many parks and open spaces mainly established in the early years of the Republic and well maintained and expanded thereafter. The most important of these parks are: Gençlik Parkı (houses an amusement park with a large pond for rowing), Botanik Park, Seğmenler Park, Anayasa Park, Kuğulu Park (famous for the swans received as a gift from the Chinese government), Abdi İpekçi Park, Esertepe Parkı, Güven Park (see above for the monument), Kurtuluş Park (has an ice-skating rink), Altınpark (also a prominent exposition/fair area), Harikalar Diyarı (claimed to be Biggest Park of Europe inside city borders) and Göksu Park. Dikmen Vadisi (Dikmen Valley) is a 70 hectares (170 acres) park and recreation area situated in Çankaya district.

Gençlik Park was depicted on the reverse of the Turkish 100 lira banknotes of 1952–1976.

Atatürk Forest Farm and Zoo (Atatürk Orman Çiftliği) is an expansive recreational farming area which houses a zoo, several small agricultural farms, greenhouses, restaurants, a dairy farm and a brewery. It is a peaceful place to spend a day with family, be it for having picnics, hiking, biking or simply enjoying good food and nature. There is also an exact replica of the house where Atatürk was born in 1881, in Thessaloniki, Greece. Visitors to the "Çiftlik" (farm) as it is affectionately called by Ankarans, can sample such famous products of the farm such as old-fashioned beer and ice cream, fresh dairy products and meat rolls/kebabs made on charcoal, at a traditional restaurant (Merkez Lokantası, Central Restaurant), cafés and other establishments scattered around the farm.

== Education ==
=== Universities ===
Ankara is noted, within Turkey, for the multitude of universities it is home to. These include the following, several of them being among the most reputable in the country:

- Ankara University
- Atılım University
- Başkent University
- Bilkent University
- Çankaya University
- Gazi University
- Gülhane Military Medical Academy
- Hacettepe University
- Middle East Technical University
- TED University
- TOBB University of Economics and Technology
- Turkish Aeronautical Association University
- Turkish Military Academy
- Turkish National Police Academy
- Ufuk University
- Yıldırım Beyazıt University

== Fauna ==
=== Angora cat ===
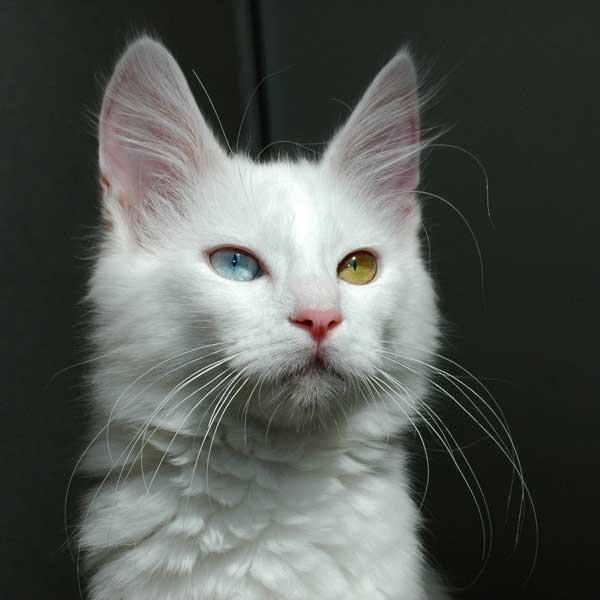
Angora cat with odd eyes (heterochromia), which is common among the Angoras

Ankara is home to a world-famous domestic cat breed – the Turkish Angora, called Ankara kedisi (Ankara cat) in Turkish. Turkish Angoras are one of the ancient, naturally occurring cat breeds, having originated in Ankara and its surrounding region in central Anatolia.

They mostly have a white, silky, medium to long length coat, no undercoat and a fine bone structure. There seems to be a connection between the Angora Cats and Persians, and the Turkish Angora is also a distant cousin of the Turkish Van. Although they are known for their shimmery white coat, there are more than twenty varieties including black, blue and reddish fur. They come in tabby and tabby-white, along with smoke varieties, and are in every color other than pointed, lavender, and cinnamon (all of which would indicate breeding to an outcross.)

Eyes may be blue, green, or amber, or even one blue and one amber or green. The W gene which is responsible for the white coat and blue eye is closely related to the hearing ability, and the presence of a blue eye can indicate that the cat is deaf to the side the blue eye is located. However, a great many blue and odd-eyed white cats have normal hearing, and even deaf cats lead a very normal life if kept indoors.

Ears are pointed and large, eyes are almond shaped and the head is massive with a two plane profile. Another characteristic is the tail, which is often kept parallel to the back.

=== Angora goat ===
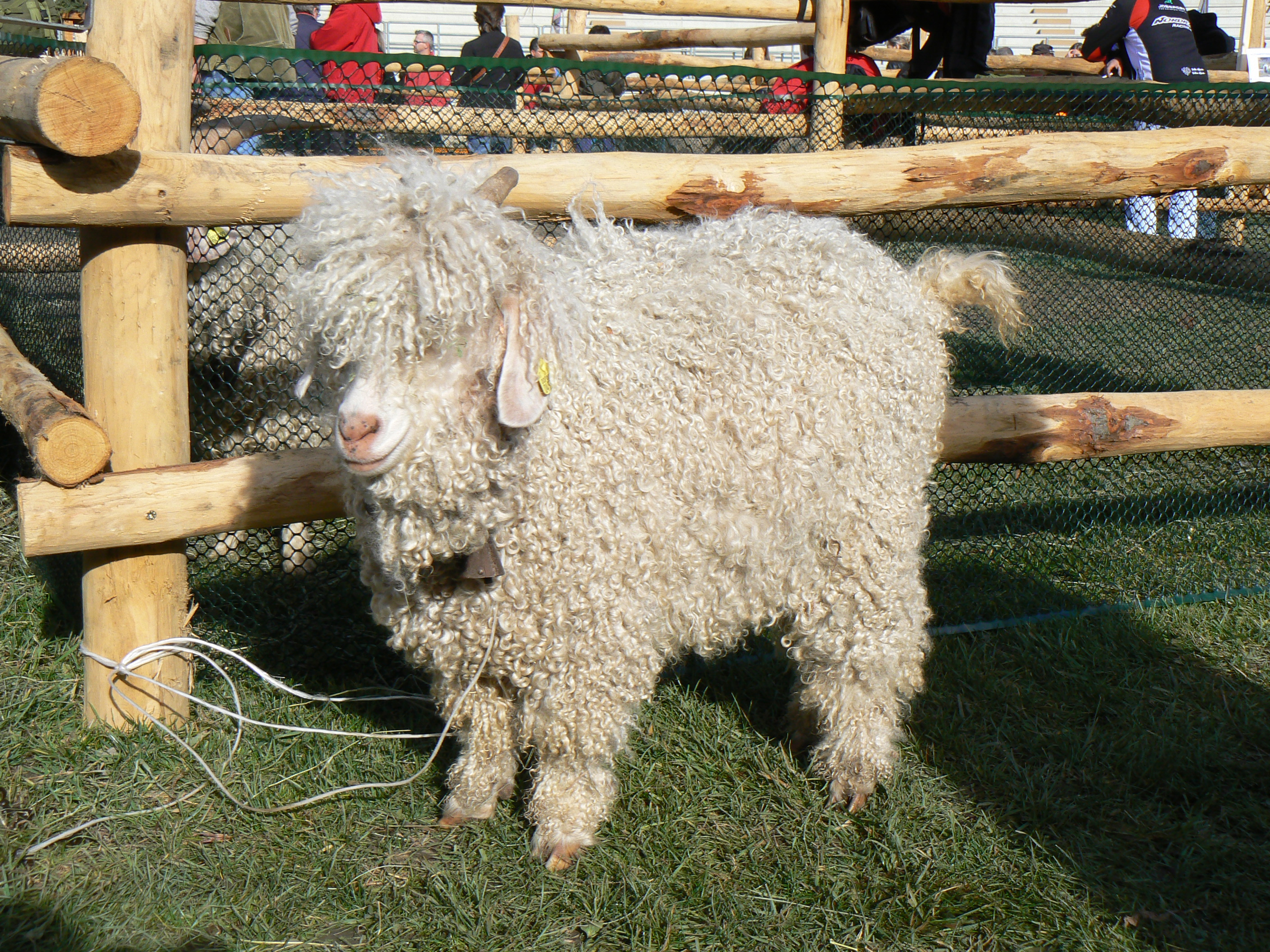
Angora goat

The Angora goat (Turkish: Ankara keçisi) is a breed of domestic goat that originated in Ankara and its surrounding region in central Anatolia.

This breed was first mentioned in the time of Moses, roughly in 1500 BC. The first Angora goats were brought to Europe by Charles V, Holy Roman Emperor, about 1554, but, like later imports, were not very successful. Angora goats were first introduced in the United States in 1849 by James P. Davis. Seven adult goats were a gift from Sultan Abdülmecid I in appreciation for his services and advice on the raising of cotton.

The fleece taken from an Angora goat is called mohair. A single goat produces between five and eight kilograms (11 and 18 pounds) of hair per year. Angoras are shorn twice a year, unlike sheep, which are shorn only once. Angoras have high nutritional requirements due to their rapid hair growth. A poor quality diet will curtail mohair development. The United States, Turkey, and South Africa are the top producers of mohair.

For a long period of time, Angora goats were bred for their white coat. In 1998, the Colored Angora Goat Breeders Association was set up to promote breeding of colored Angoras. Today, Angora goats produce white, black (deep black to greys and silver), red (the color fades significantly as the goat gets older), and brownish fiber.

Angora goats were depicted on the reverse of the Turkish 50 lira banknotes of 1938–1952.

=== Angora rabbit ===
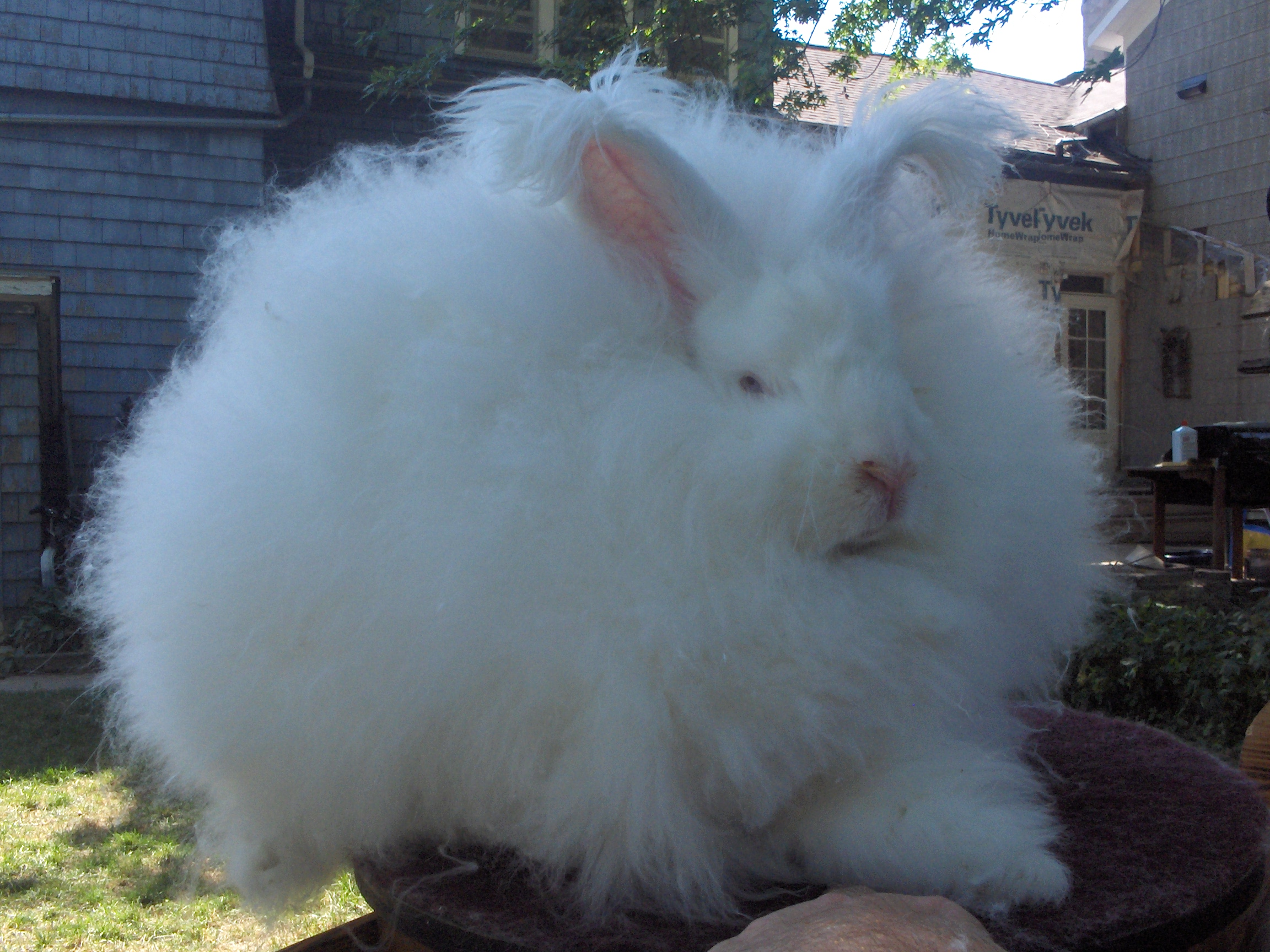
Angora rabbit

The Angora rabbit (Turkish: Ankara tavşanı) is a variety of domestic rabbit bred for its long, soft hair. The Angora is one of the oldest types of domestic rabbit, originating in Ankara and its surrounding region in central Anatolia, along with the Angora cat and Angora goat. The rabbits were popular pets with French royalty in the mid-18th century, and spread to other parts of Europe by the end of the century. They first appeared in the United States in the early 20th century. They are bred largely for their long Angora wool, which may be removed by shearing, combing, or plucking (gently pulling loose wool).

Angoras are bred mainly for their wool because it is silky and soft. They have a humorous appearance, as they resemble a fur ball. Most are calm and docile but should be handled carefully. Grooming is necessary to prevent the fiber from matting and felting on the rabbit. A condition called "wool block" is common in Angora rabbits and should be treated quickly. Sometimes they are shorn in the summer as the long fur can cause the rabbits to overheat.

== International relations ==
=== Twin towns and sister cities ===
Ankara is twinned with:

- Seoul, South Korea (since 1971)
- Islamabad, Pakistan (since 1982)
- Kuala Lumpur, Malaysia (since 1984)
- Beijing, China (since 1990)
- Amman, Jordan (since 1992)
- Bishkek, Kyrgyzstan (since 1992)
- Budapest, Hungary (since 1992)
- Khartoum, Sudan (since 1992)
- Moscow, Russia (since 1992)
- Sofia, Bulgaria (since 1992)
- Havana, Cuba (since 1993)
- Kyiv, Ukraine (since 1993)
- Ashgabat, Turkmenistan (since 1994)
- Kuwait City, Kuwait (since 1994)
- Sarajevo, Bosnia and Herzegovina (since 1994)
- Tirana, Albania (since 1995)
- (Georgia (country)) Tbilisi, Georgia (since 1996)
- Ufa, Bashkortostan, Russia (since 1997)
- Alanya, Turkey
- Bucharest, Romania (since 1998)
- Hanoi, Vietnam (since 1998)
- Manama, Bahrain (since 2000)
- Mogadishu, Somalia (since 2000)
- Santiago, Chile (since 2000)
- Astana, Kazakhstan (since 2001)
- Dushanbe, Tajikistan (since 2003)
- Kabul, Afghanistan (since 2003)
- Ulaanbaatar, Mongolia (since 2003)
- Cairo, Egypt (since 2004)
- Chișinău, Moldova (since 2004)
- Sanaa, Yemen (since 2004)
- Tashkent, Uzbekistan (since 2004)
- Pristina, Kosovo (since 2005)
- Kazan, Tatarstan, Russia (since 2005)
- Kinshasa, Democratic Republic of the Congo (since 2005)
- Addis Ababa, Ethiopia (since 2006)
- Minsk, Belarus (since 2007)
- Zagreb, Croatia (since 2008)
- Damascus, Syria (since 2010)
- Bissau, Guinea-Bissau (since 2011)
- (United States) Washington, D.C., US (since 2011)
- Bangkok, Thailand (since 2012)
- Tehran, Iran (since 2013)
- Doha, Qatar (since 2016)
- Podgorica, Montenegro (since 7 March 2019)
- North Nicosia, Northern Cyprus
- Djibouti City, Djibouti (since 2017)

=== Partner cities ===
- Skopje, North Macedonia (since 1995)
- Vienna, Austria

== See also ==
- Ankara Agreement
- ATO Congresium
- Battle of Ancyra
- Battle of Ankara
- List of bridges in Ankara
- List of hospitals in Ankara Province
- List of libraries in Ankara
- List of tallest buildings in Ankara
- Synod of Ancyra
- Treaty of Ankara (disambiguation)
- Victory Monument (Ankara)
