= Yaylaköy =

Yaylaköy can refer to:

- Yaylaköy, Aşkale
- Yaylaköy, Bala
- Yaylaköy, Dazkırı
- Yaylaköy, Keşan
- Yaylaköy, Kuşadası
