= Dikmen Vadisi =

Recreational park in Ankara, Turkey

- Dikmen Valley
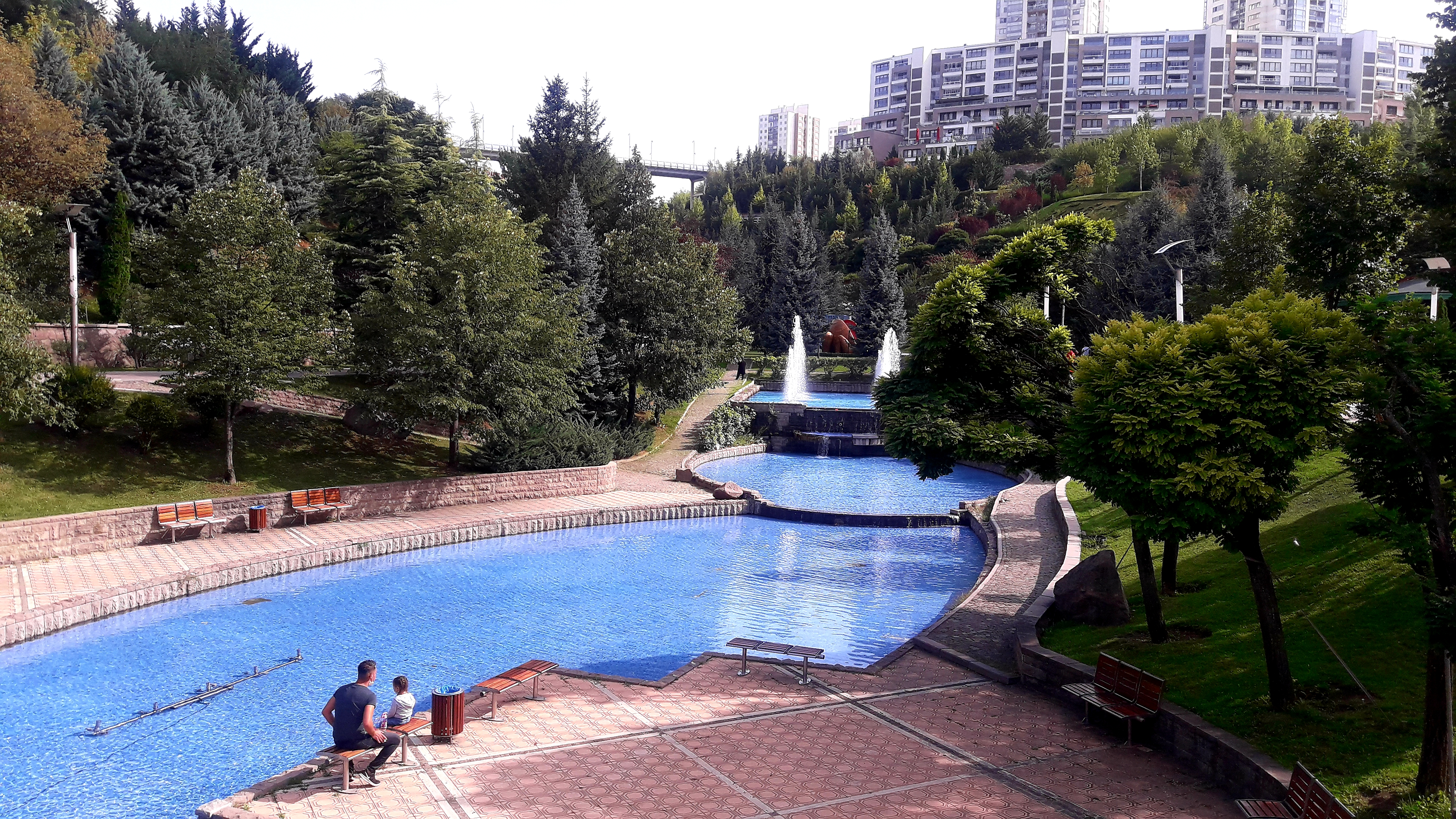
- A view of Dikmen Vadisi

- Location within Turkey
- Location: Dikmen, Çankaya
- Nearest city: Ankara
- Coordinates: 39°53′07″N 32°50′48″E
- Area: 70.7 ha (175 acres)
- Created: 1996
- Governing body: Ankara Metropolitan Municipality

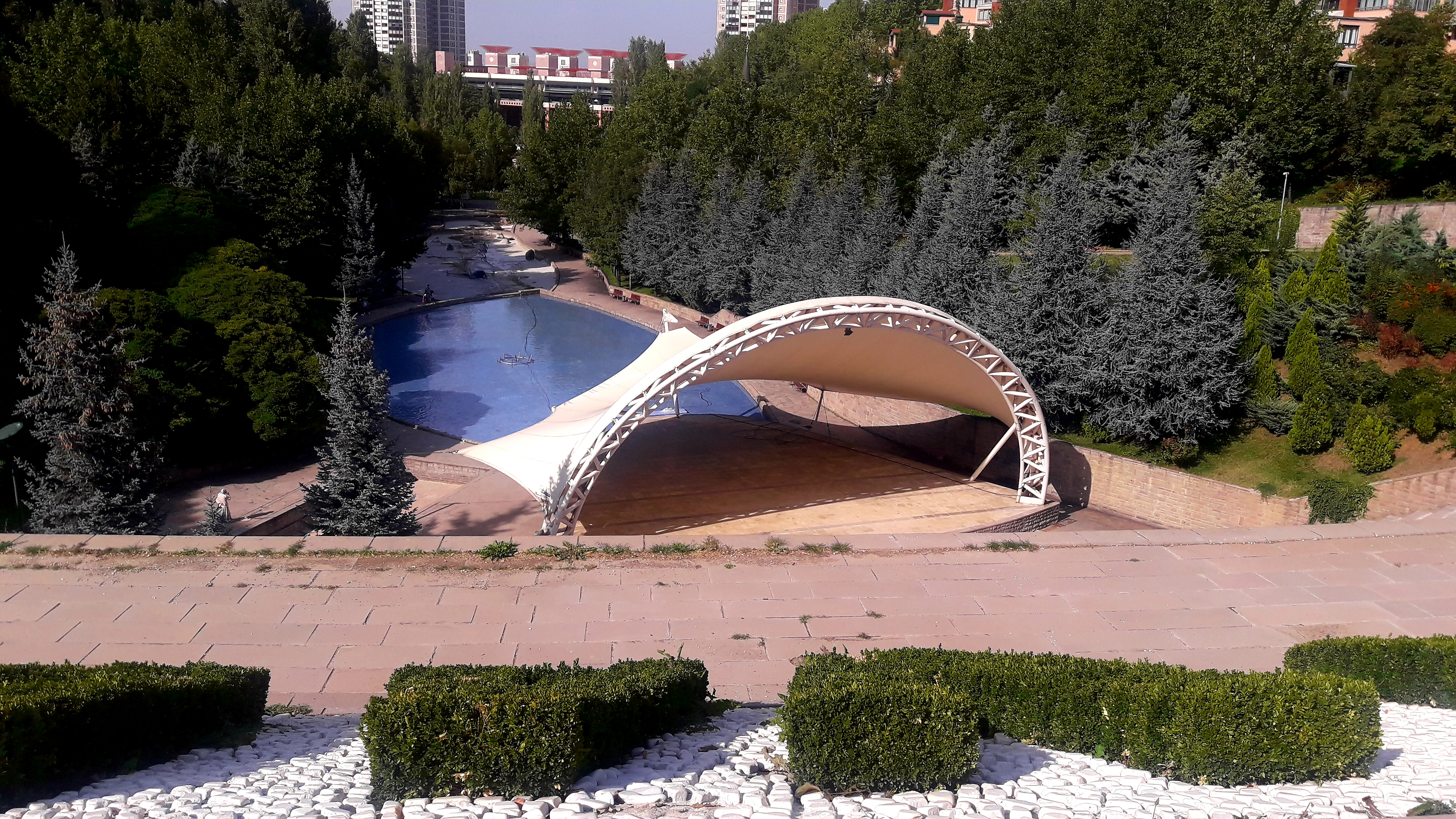
Dikmen Valley to north

Dikmen Vadisi (literally "Dikmen Valley") is a popular recreation and picnic area in Ankara, Turkey.

== Location ==
The valley is a dried-up stream bed at Dikmen quarter in Çankaya ilçe (district) of Ankara. It is oriented north to east direction between the neighborhoods of Dikmen and Ayrancı. Dikmen street runs in the west and Hoşdere street runs in the east of the valley. There are two high overpasses on the valley.

== History ==
The valley was once a village far from the city center. The population of Ankara rapidly increased and by 1970s modern neighborhoods appeared around the valley. Beginning by 1990s, the municipality of Ankara decided to establish a recreation area in the valley. The villagers and the municipality agreed on a plan to evacuate the village. The municipality began to establish the recreation area in three stages. The first stage was completed on 13 September 1996 The second stage was completed in 2002 and the third in 2009.

== Recreation area ==
The total area is 70.7 ha (175 acres). There are 68 shops and coffee houses, two swimming pools, two sports centers as well as a 3 km (1.9 mi) - trekking trail. There is also an observation terrace, a climbing wall, a children's village and a mosque. Admission is free of charge.
