= List of tallest buildings in Ankara =

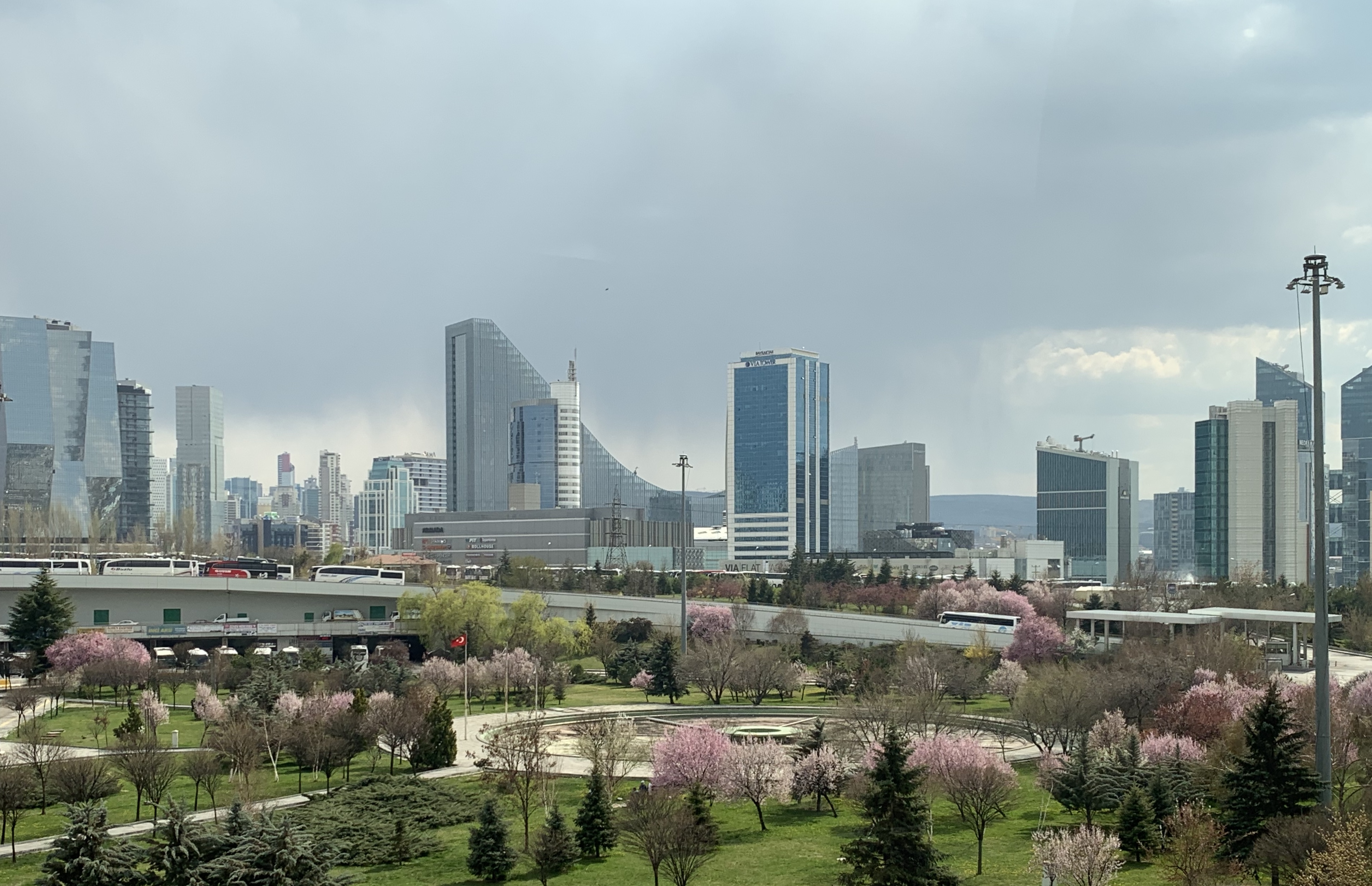
Skyline of Ankara

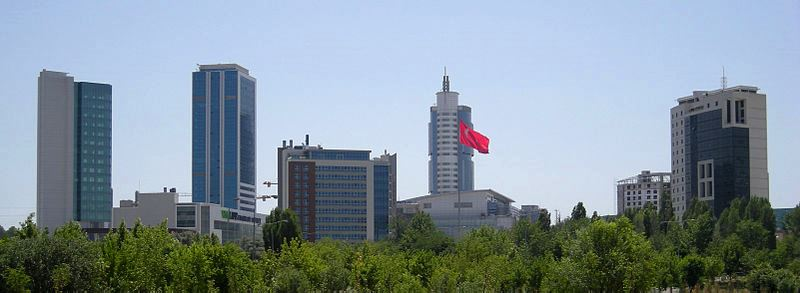
Skyscrapers in Söğütözü, Ankara

Ankara, the capital of Turkey, has a total of 13 skyscrapers, defined as buildings taller than 150 meters (492 feet), as of April 2020. Outside of Istanbul, Turkey's largest city, Ankara contains some of the country's tallest buildings. The Elya Tower will be the tallest building in Ankara when it was completed in 2020, measuring 210 meters in height. It will replace the Türk Telekon Tower building, which has a height of 192 meters and was completed in 2015.

Prior to the 2010s, Ankara had no buildings taller than 150 meters. The Sheraton Ankara, a hotel and convention centre, was one of the first notable tall buildings to be built in the city, in 1991. However, it did not reach a height of 150 meters; the first building to do so was the Portakal Cicegi Tower, which was completed in 2011. The decade saw a major boom in the construction of high-rises and skyscrapers in Ankara, similar to the Turkish cities of Istanbul and Izmir; all 13 of Ankara's skyscrapers were built after 2010.

Most of Ankara's skyscrapers are located in Söğütözü, Ankara's business district.

== Tallest buildings ==
The following list ranks complete buildings in Ankara by height that are at least 90 meters tall.

Was the tallest building in Ankara upon completion

Rank	Name	Image	Height (m)	Floors	Year	Primary use	Notes
1	Elya Royal Tower		195	40	2020	Mixed use	Tallest building in Ankara.
2	Türk Telekom Tower		192	36	2015	Office	
3	Asce Zenith		187	55	2025	Residential	
4	Kuzu Effect		186	46	2018	Mixed use	
5	Sinpaş Ege Vadisi		180	48	2020	Residential	
6	Elmar Towers 1		177	50	2019	Office	
7	Metafor Ankara		162	40	2024	Mixed use	
8	One Tower		161	38	2016	Residential	
9	Portakal Cicegi Kulesi		160	37	2011	Residential	
10	Sinpaş Altınoran Kuleleri		155	40	2015	Residential	
11	YDA Center		154	37	2019	Mixed Use	Originally planned at 166 meters, the building's height dropped to 154 meters after the rooftop extension was removed due to issues encountered toward the end of construction.
12	Vega Park Towers		151	46	2013	Residential	
13	Vega Park Towers		151	46	2013	Residential	
13	Regnum Sky Tower		150	30	2016	Office	
15	Koç Towers		147	37	2015	Office	
16	Koç Towers		147	37	2015	Office	
17	Nev201		145	34	2022	Office	
18	Merkez Ankara E Block		144	41	2023	Residential	
19	Sheraton Ankara		143-111	29	1991	Hotel	
20	Tim Towers		142	39	2017	Residential	
21	Tim Towers		142	39	2017	Residential	
22	Merkez Ankara Office Towers B-C		142	33	2026	Office	
23	Merkez Ankara Office Towers B-C		142	33	2026	Office	
24	TOBB Towers		140	34	2001	Office	
25	TOBB Towers		140	34	2001	Office	
26	Nova Tower		140	42	2013	Residential	
27	Dikmen Valley Towers		140	36	1996	Residential	
28	Dikmen Valley Towers		140	36	1996	Residential	
29	Dikmen Valley Towers		140	36	1996	Residential	
30	Dikmen Valley Towers		140	36	1996	Residential	
31	İlbank Headquarters		135	32	2021	Office	
32	Merkez Ankara F Block		135	38	2023	Residential	
33	Next Level Ankara Office Tower		134	32	2013	Office	
34	Yıldırım Tower		130	36	2017	Office	
35	Uptown İncek		130	36	2015	Residential	
36	Kumru Ankara		125	33	2018	Residential	
37	Halkbank Headquarters		123	34	1993	Office	
38	Armada Office Tower		122	21	2002	Office	
39	Veb Tower		122	36	2018	Residential	
40	Merkez Ankara G Block		121	34	2023	Residential	
41	Paragon Tower		116	29	2014	Office	
42	Elit Manzara Beytepe		116	34	2018	Residential	
43	JW Marriott Hotel		115	23	2011	Hotel	
44	Merkez Ankara Public Building 2		115	27	2021	Office	
45	Merkez Ankara D Block		115	32	2023	Residential	
46	Next Level Ankara Loft Office		113	29	2014	Residential	
47	Merkez Ankara L3 Block		113	31	2023	Residential	
48	Merkez Ankara H Block		113	31	2023	Residential	
49	Next Level Ankara Residence Tower		100	23	2013	Residential	
50	Hacı Omer Sabancı Dormitory		98	28	1984	Residential	
51	BDDK Tower		91	26	1975	Office	

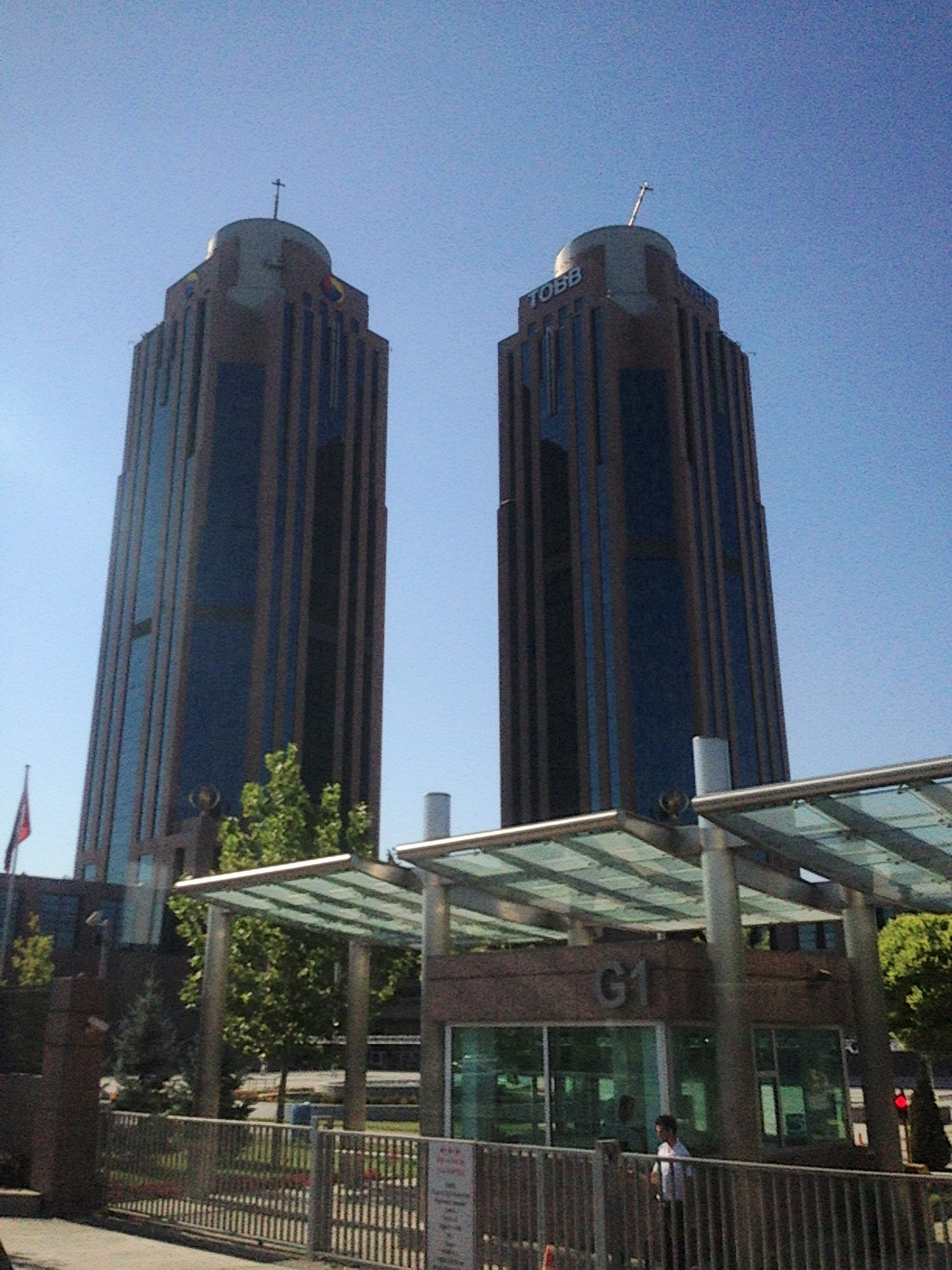
TOBB Towers (2001) on Eskişehir Road

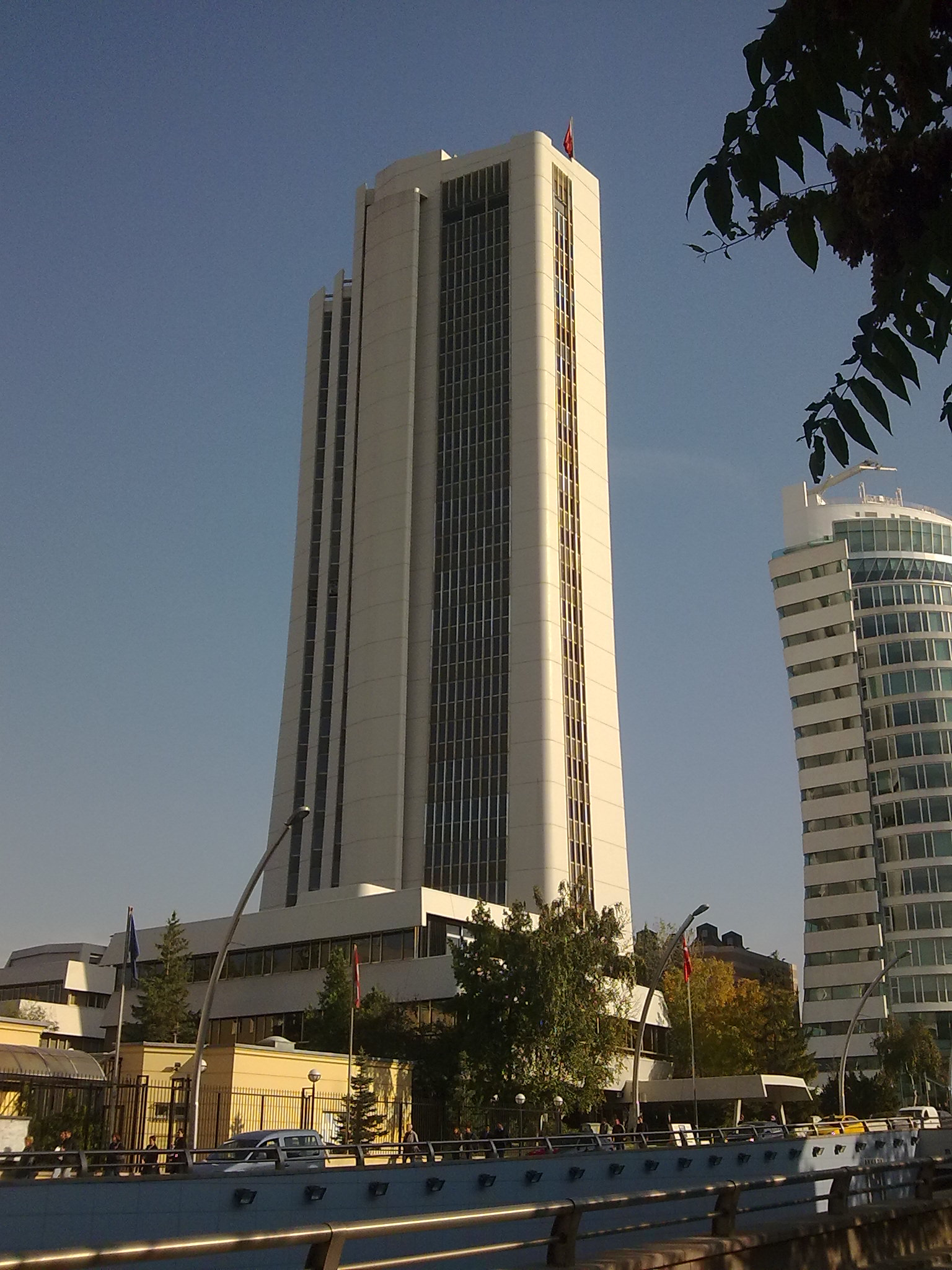
BDDK Tower (1975) on Atatürk Avenue

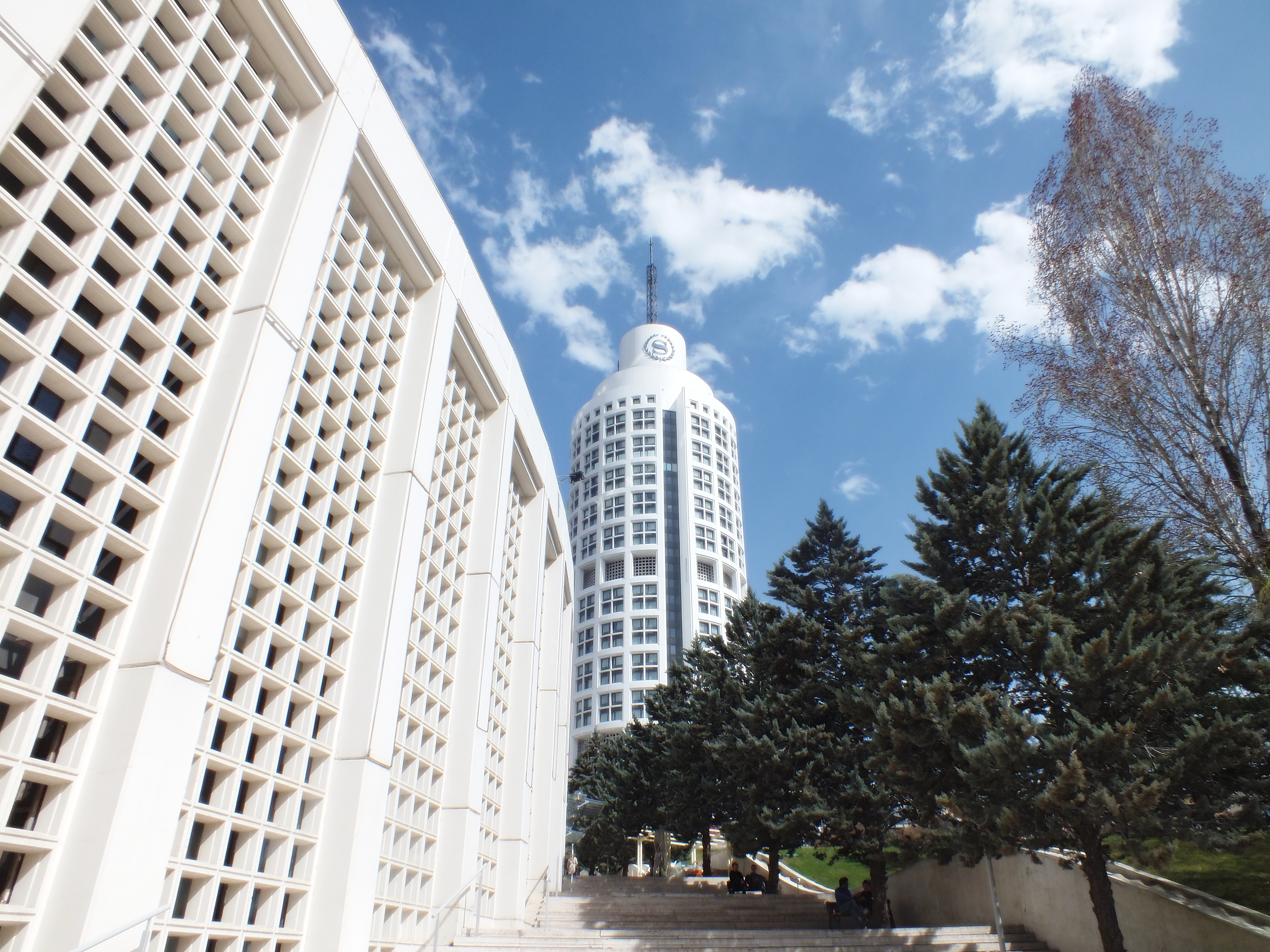
Sheraton Ankara Hotel & Convention Center (1991) in Kavaklıdere

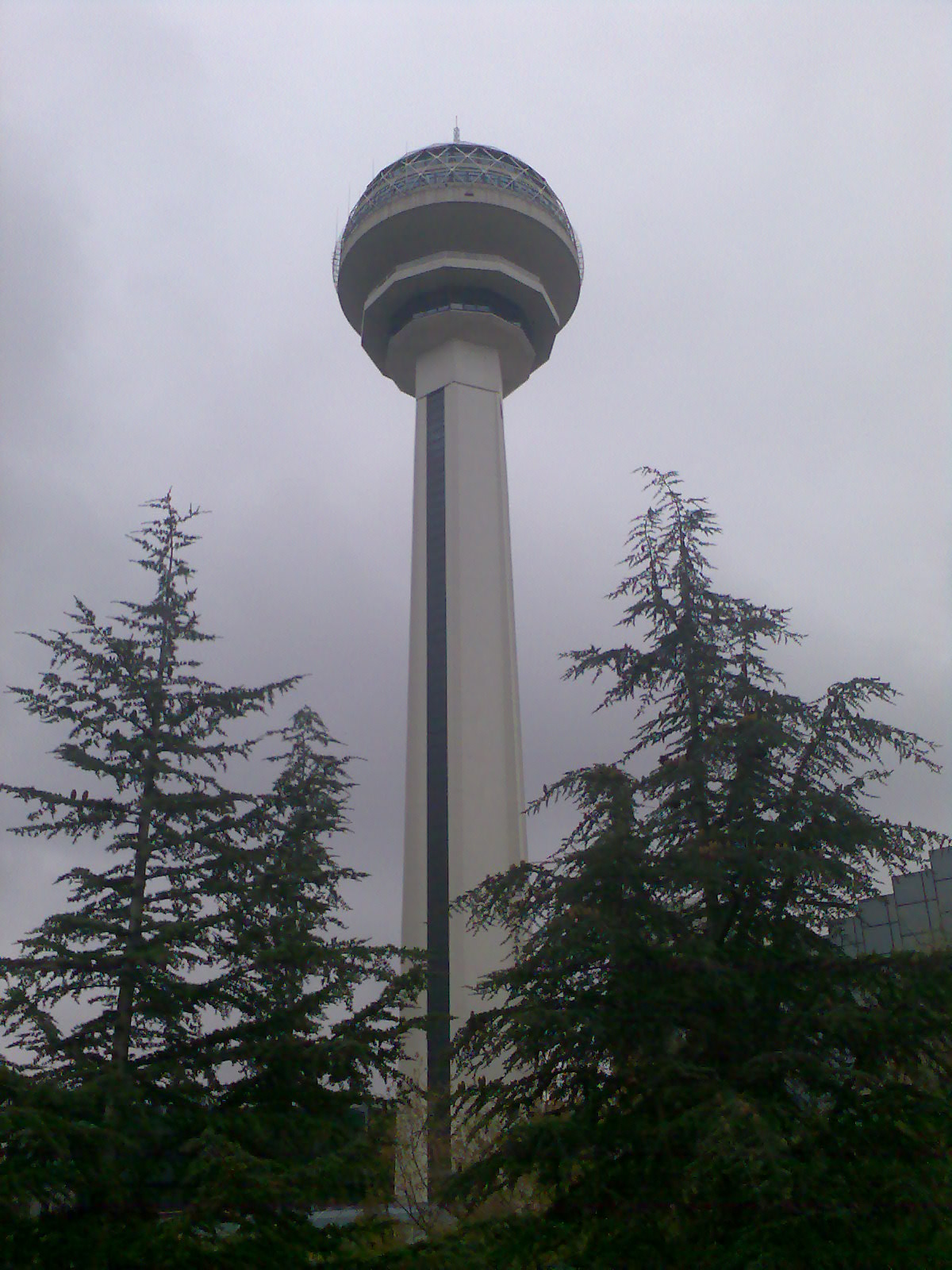
Atakule Tower (1989) is one of the landmarks of Ankara. The tower's observation decks and rotating restaurant offer panoramic views of the city center.

== Observation and TV towers of Ankara ==
Rank	Name	Image	Height (meters)	Status	Year
1	Republic Tower		197	Built	2024
1	Atakule Tower		125	Built	1989

== Tall buildings of Ankara under construction ==
List of buildings under construction which are higher than 90 m, including spires and architectural details. Based on floorcounts and floorheights; buildings without official height (including spires and architectural details) are also included as they are estimated to be higher than 90 m.

Rank	Name	Height in meters (feet)	Floors	Completion year
1	Merkez Ankara Office Tower	320 (1,050)	71	2020
2	Sinpaş The First	201 (659)	45	2016
3	Turk Telekom Tower	192 (630)	41	2014
4	Sinpaş Altın Oran	155 (508)	45	2015
=4	Sinpaş Altın Oran	155 (508)	45	2015
5	Nova Tower	140 (459)	42	2014
6	Otokoç Tower		33	2015
=6	Otokoç Tower		33	2015
8	Kızılırmak Plaza		34	2015
9	Ege Plaza		25	2015
10	Çankaya Öğrenci Yurdu	130 (427)	33	2015
11	Pladyum		31	2015
12	Usta Plaza		30	2015
13	Pylon Residence		33	2015
14	Folding Towers		30	2016
15	Folding Towers		30	2016
16	Çukurambar İş Merkezi		29	2015
17	West Gate		33	2015
=17	West Gate		33	2015
=17	West Gate		33	2015
20	Next Level 2	113 (371)	29	2014
21	Taurus Plaza	110 (361)	25	2015
22	Besa Tower	110 (361)	25	2016
=22	Sinpaş İncek Life	110 (361)	25	2016
24	Next Level 3	100 (328)	25	2016
25	Kızılırmak Residence		27	2016
=25	Kızılırmak Residence		27	2016

== Timeline ==
Name	Height (meters)	Floors	Year
Emek Ishani	76	24	1962 - 1975
BDDK - Banking Regulation & Supervision Council	108	29	1975 - 1991
Sheraton Ankara	143	29	1991 - 2009
Portakal Cicegi Kulesi	160	37	2009 - 2016
One Tower	185	38	2016 - 2018
Kuzu Effect	186	48	2018–Present

== See also ==
- Ankara
- List of tallest buildings in Turkey
