= Evciler (disambiguation) =

Evciler is a town and district of Afyonkarahisar Province, Turkey.

Evciler may also refer to the following places in Turkey:

- Evciler, Anamur, a village in Anamur district of Mersin Province
- Evciler, Bala, a village in Bala district of Ankara Province
- Evciler, Bayramiç
- Evciler, Çine, a village in Çine district of Aydın Province
- Evciler, Gölhisar a village in Gölhisar district of Burdur Province
- Evciler, İvrindi, a village
- Evciler, Mudanya
