= Çankaya, Ankara (neighbourhood) =

Çankaya
- Neighbourhood
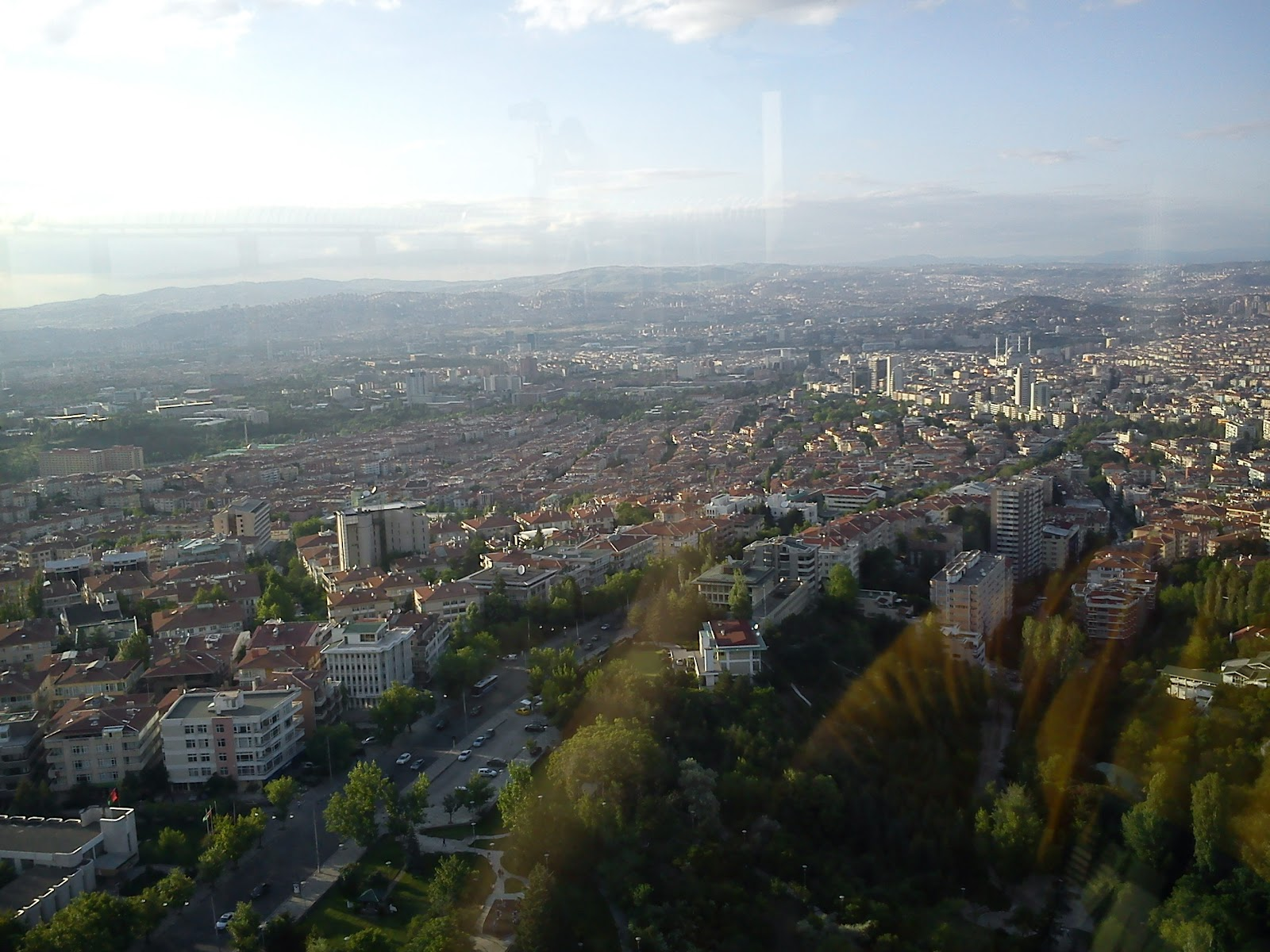
- The view from Atakule to Çankaya.

- Location within Turkey Location within Turkey Central Anatolia
- Coordinates: 39°55′28″N 32°53′08″E
- Country: Turkey
- Province: Ankara
- District: Çankaya
- Population (2022): 7,638
- Time zone: UTC+3 (TRT)

Çankaya is a neighbourhood in the municipality and district of Çankaya, Ankara Province, Turkey. Its population is 7,638 (2022).

== Locally located structures ==
- Çankaya Mansion
- Atakule
- Ankara Botanic Park
- Turkish Revenue Administration

== Demographics ==
Historical population
Year	Pop.	±% p.a.
2007	7,312	—
2012	7,357	+0.12%
2017	8,196	+2.18%
2022	7,638	−1.40%
Source: TÜIK (2007-2022)
