= 125th Anniversary Çayyolu Stage =

Theatre in Ankara, Turkey

Coordinates: 39.9208°N 32.8541°E

125th Anniversary Çayyolu Stage (Turkish: 125. Yıl Çayyolu Sahnesi), is a theatre in Çayyolu suburb of Çankaya district in Ankara, Turkey. It is operated by the Turkish State Theatres.
