= Çayyolu =

- Neighbourhood
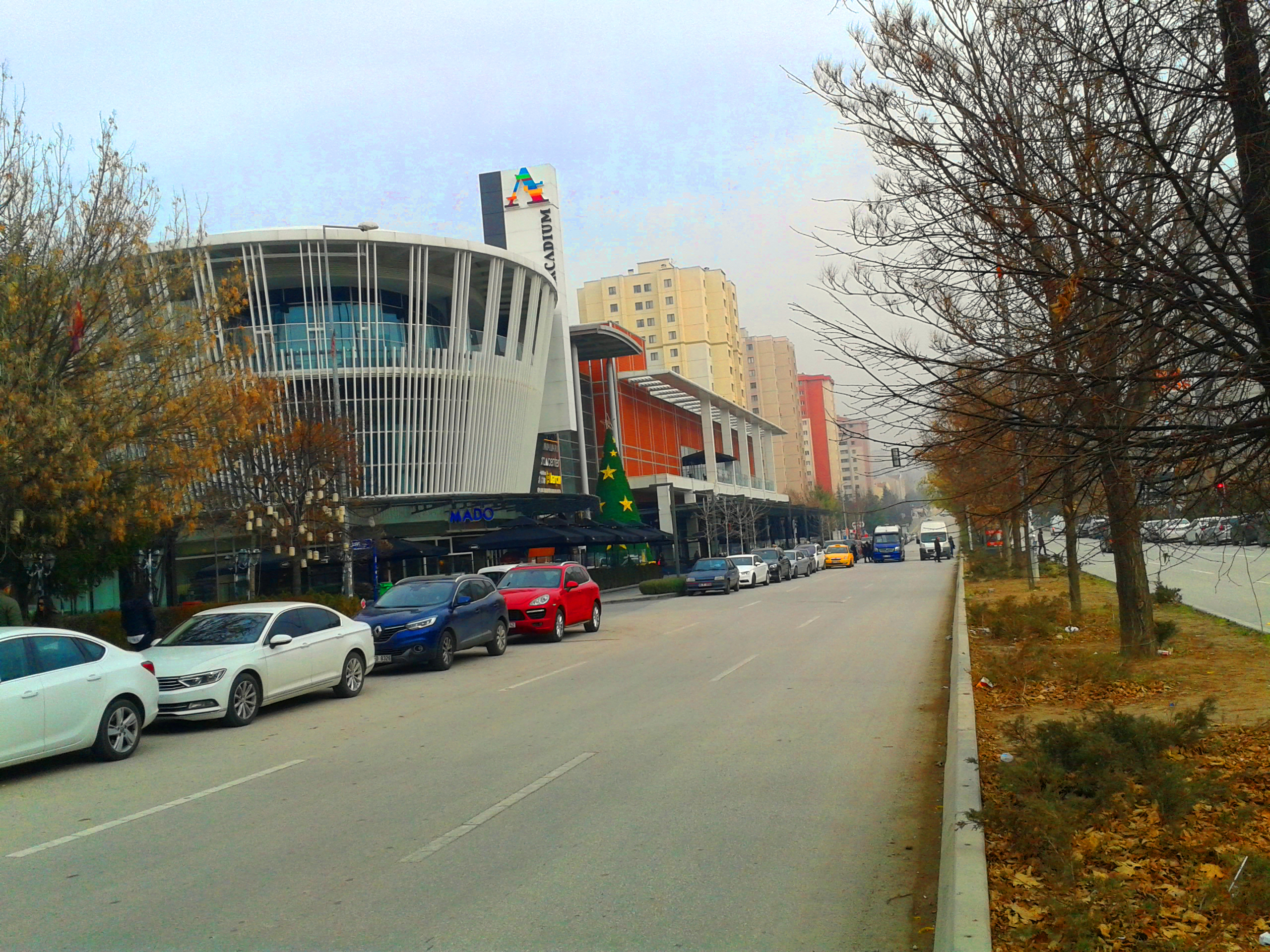
- Main street from south west to north east

- Location within Turkey Location within Turkey Central Anatolia
- Coordinates: 39°53′N 32°42′E
- Country: Turkey
- Province: Ankara
- District: Çankaya
- Elevation: 925 m (3,035 ft)
- Population (2022): 6,695
- Time zone: UTC+3 (TRT)
- Postal code: 06810
- Area code: 0312

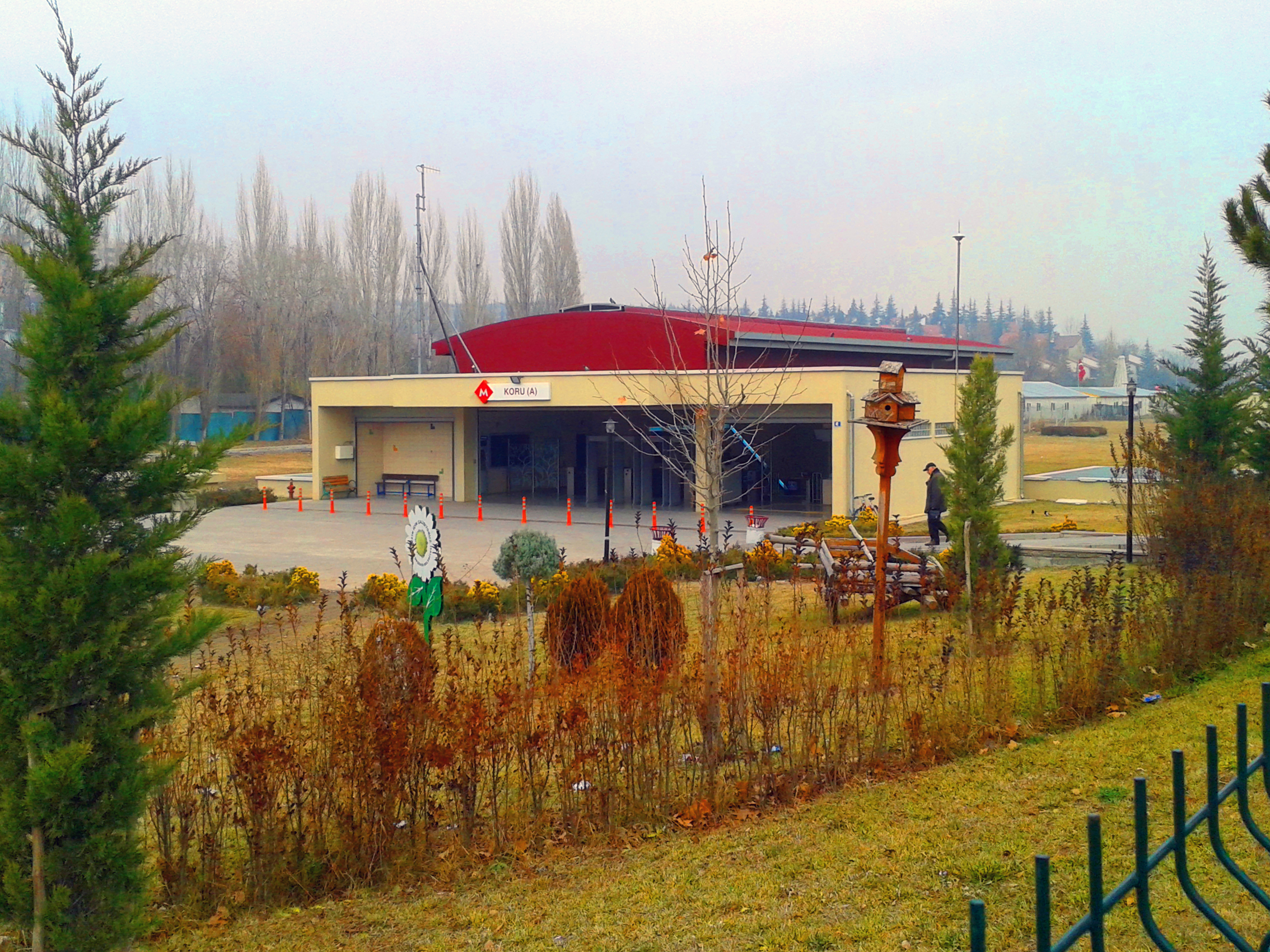
Koru station, the last station in Ankara M2 metro

Çayyolu is a neighbourhood in the municipality and district of Çankaya, Ankara Province, Turkey. Its population is 6,695 (2022).

== Location and history ==
Çayyolu is situated to the west of Hacettepe University Beytepe campus, to the east of Ankara ring road and to the south of the Turkish state highway D.200. Its distance to the Ankara centrum is about 20 kilometres (12 mi). The core of the suburb is a former village named Kutuğun situated almost at the center of the Çayyolu suburb. Çayyolu is approximately a 400-year-old Turkish village. In 1967 the village was renamed Çayyolu. Beginning by the next year, housing projects around the village transformed the rural area into an urban area. Up to 2012, it was a part of Yenimahalle ilçe (district). But in 2012, it was included in the Çankaya ilçe. Today Çayyolu is a modern suburb with parks, shopping malls, supermarkets, restaurants, coffeehouses, cinema halls a sports complex and a theatre named 125th Anniversary Çayyolu Stage.

== Population ==
Currently in addition to Çayyolu there are eight neighborhoods: Alacaatlı, Dodorga, Konutkent, Koru, Profesör Ahmet Taner Kışlalı, Ümitköy and Yaşamkent all of which collectively are known as Çayyolu. From east to west Mutlukent, Ümitköy, Koru, Konutkent and Yaşamkent are along the highway. The population of these neighborhoods as of 2022 are shown in the table.

Name of the neighborhood	Population (2022)
Alacaatlı	42,784
Çayyolu	6,695
Dodurga	11,537
Konutkent	9,122
Koru	14,092
Profesör Doktor Ahmet Taner Kışlalı	19,035
Ümitköy	14,140
Yaşamkent	22,436

== Mass transportation ==
The mass transportation between Ankara centrum and Çayyolu is via Ankara Metro M2. The last three stations of the metro namely, Ümitköy, Çayyolu and Koru are actually within the suburb.
