= Kömürcü, Çankaya =

Kömürcü
- Neighbourhood
- Location in Turkey Kömürcü (Turkey Central Anatolia)
- Coordinates: 39.7717°N 32.9958°E
- Country: Turkey
- Province: Ankara
- District: Çankaya
- Population (2022): 101
- Time zone: UTC+3 (TRT)

Kömürcü is a neighbourhood in the municipality and district of Çankaya, Ankara Province, Turkey. Its population is 101 (2022). In 2008 it passed from the Bala District to the Çankaya District.
