= Gaziosmanpaşa, Çankaya =

Gaziosmanpaşa
- Neighbourhood
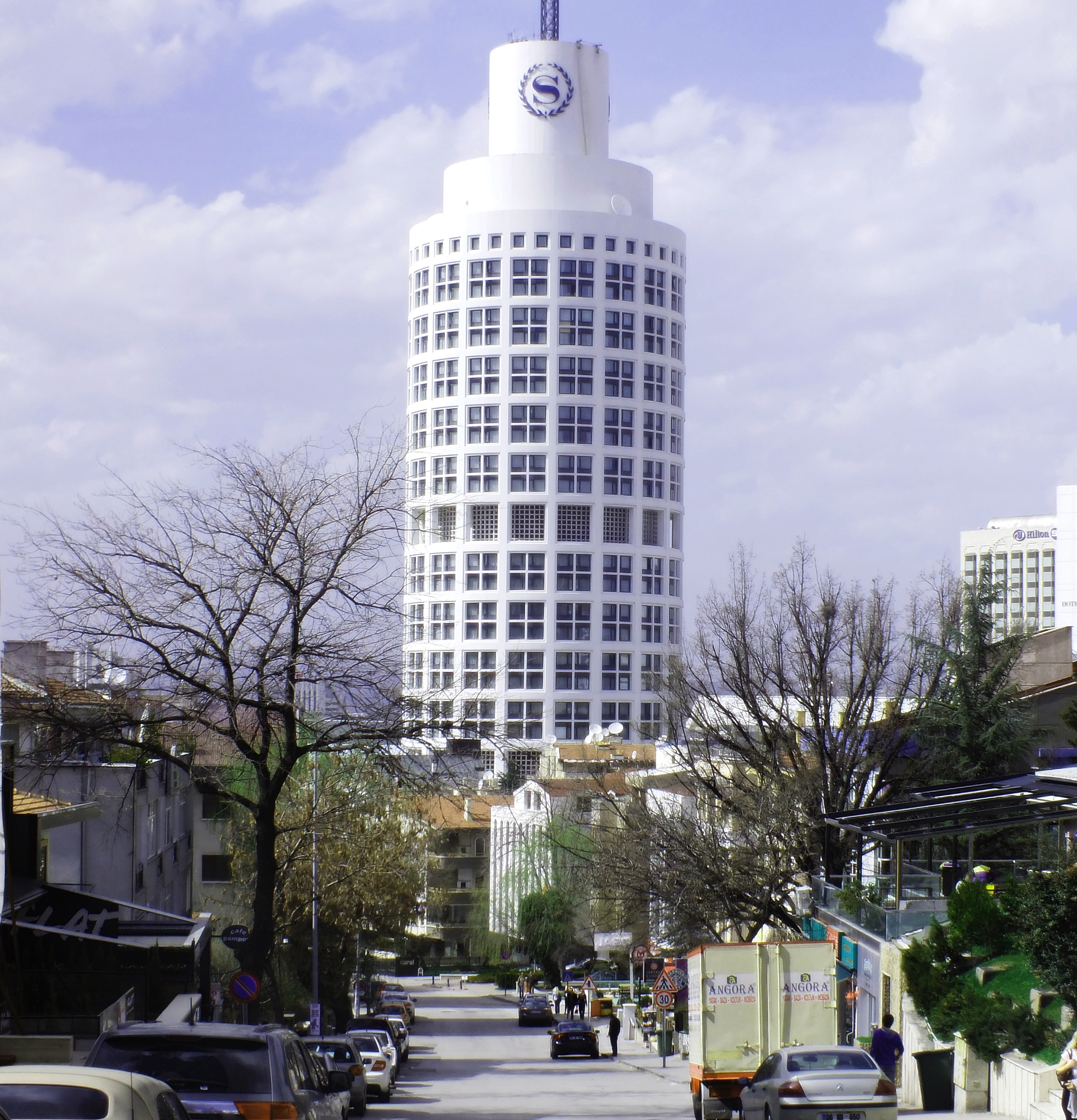
- A view of Arjantin Caddesi, a street in Gaziosmanpaşa

- Location within Turkey Location within Turkey Central Anatolia
- Coordinates: 39°53′50″N 32°51′58″E
- Country: Turkey
- Province: Ankara
- District: Çankaya
- Population (2022): 3,621
- Time zone: UTC+3 (TRT)

Gaziosmanpaşa, often shortened as GOP, is a neighbourhood in the municipality and district of Çankaya, Ankara Province, Turkey. Its population is 3,621 (2022). It is just south of the city center of Ankara. Several embassies accredited to the Republic of Turkey are situated here.

== See also ==
- Gaziosmanpaşa
