= Söğütözü =

Central business district in Ankara, Turkey

- Neighbourhood
- Location in Turkey Söğütözü (Turkey Central Anatolia)
- Country: Turkey
- Province: Ankara
- District: Çankaya
- Population (2022): 5,668
- Time zone: UTC+3 (TRT)

Söğütözü is a neighbourhood in the municipality and district of Çankaya, Ankara Province, Turkey. Its population is 5,668 (2022).

It is located between the Eskişehir Road (D-200 Eskişehir Yolu) and Atatürk Forest Farm and Zoo. Its postal code is 06510.

Many of the city's newest skyscrapers and shopping malls such as the Armada Tower & Mall are in Söğütözü, which is served by a subway station on the M2 line of the Ankara Metro, and a light rail station on the A1 line of Ankaray.

== Gallery ==
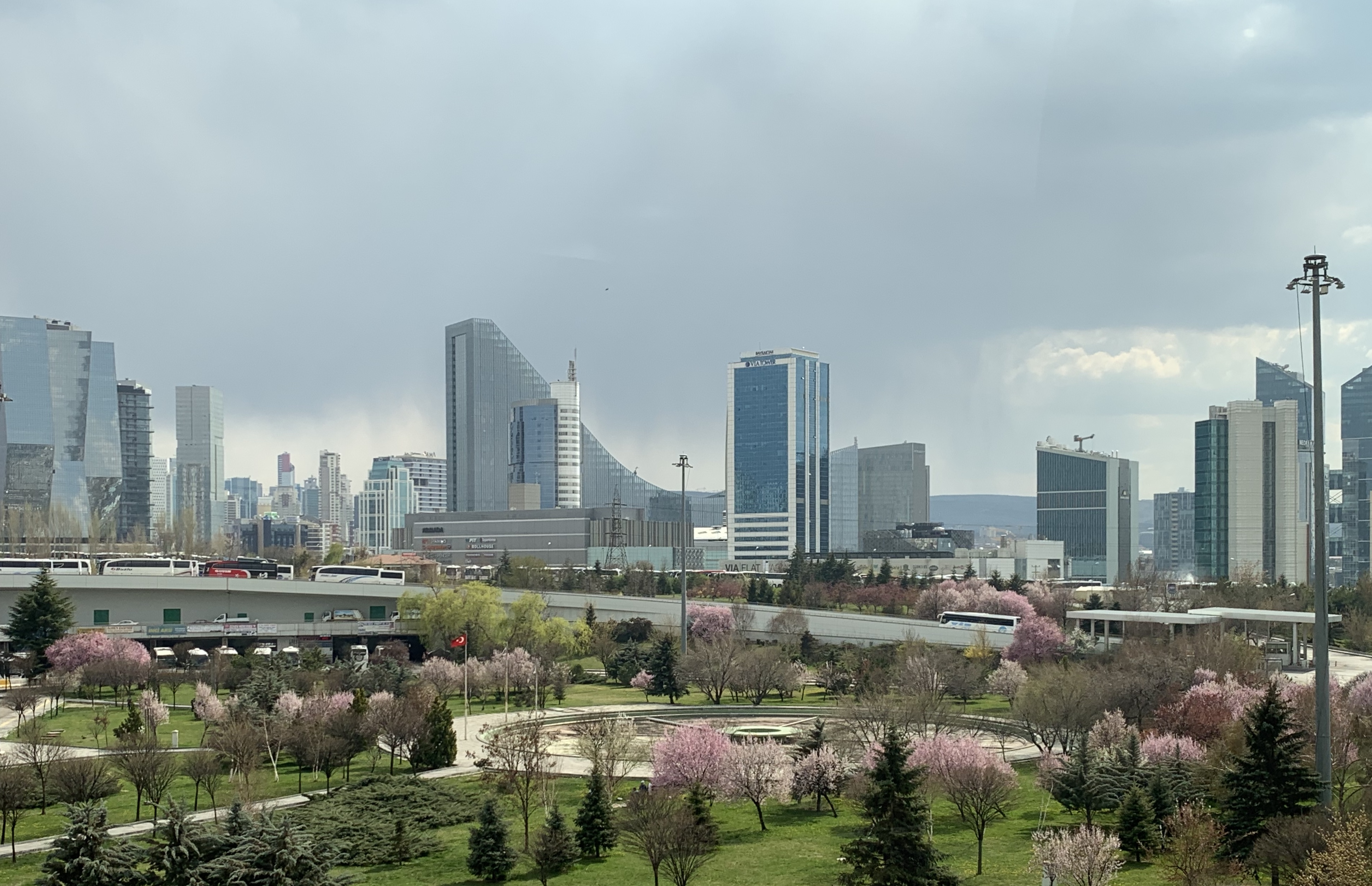
Skyline of Söğütözü viewed from the Intercity Bus Terminal (AŞTİ)

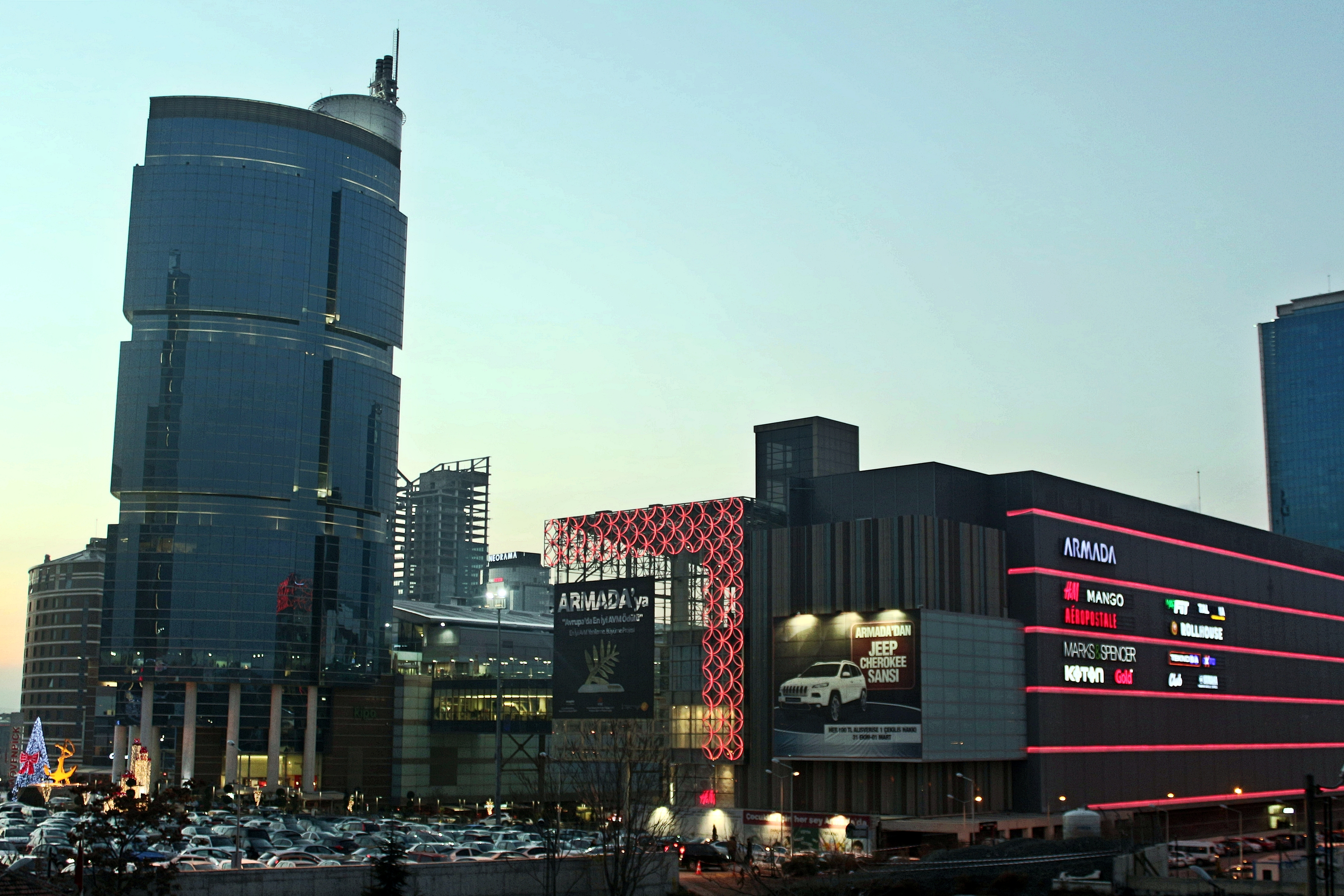
Armada Mall in Söğütözü, Ankara

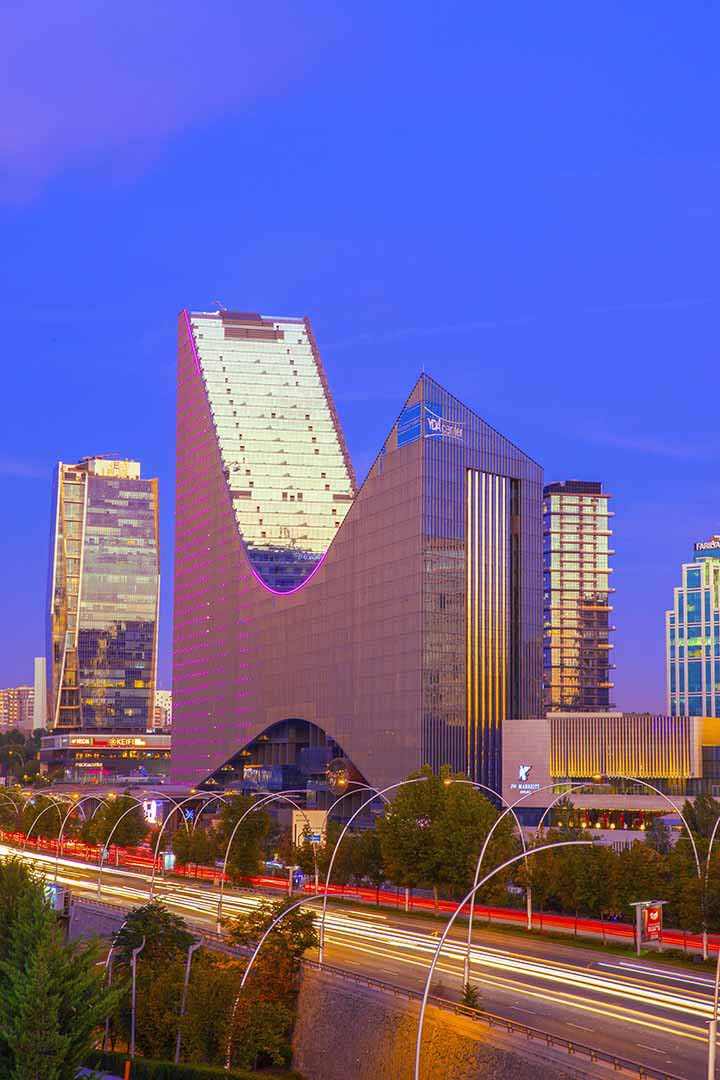
YDA Center in Söğütözü, Ankara

== See also ==
- List of shopping malls in Ankara
- List of tallest buildings in Ankara
