= TOBB Towers =

Buildings in Turkey

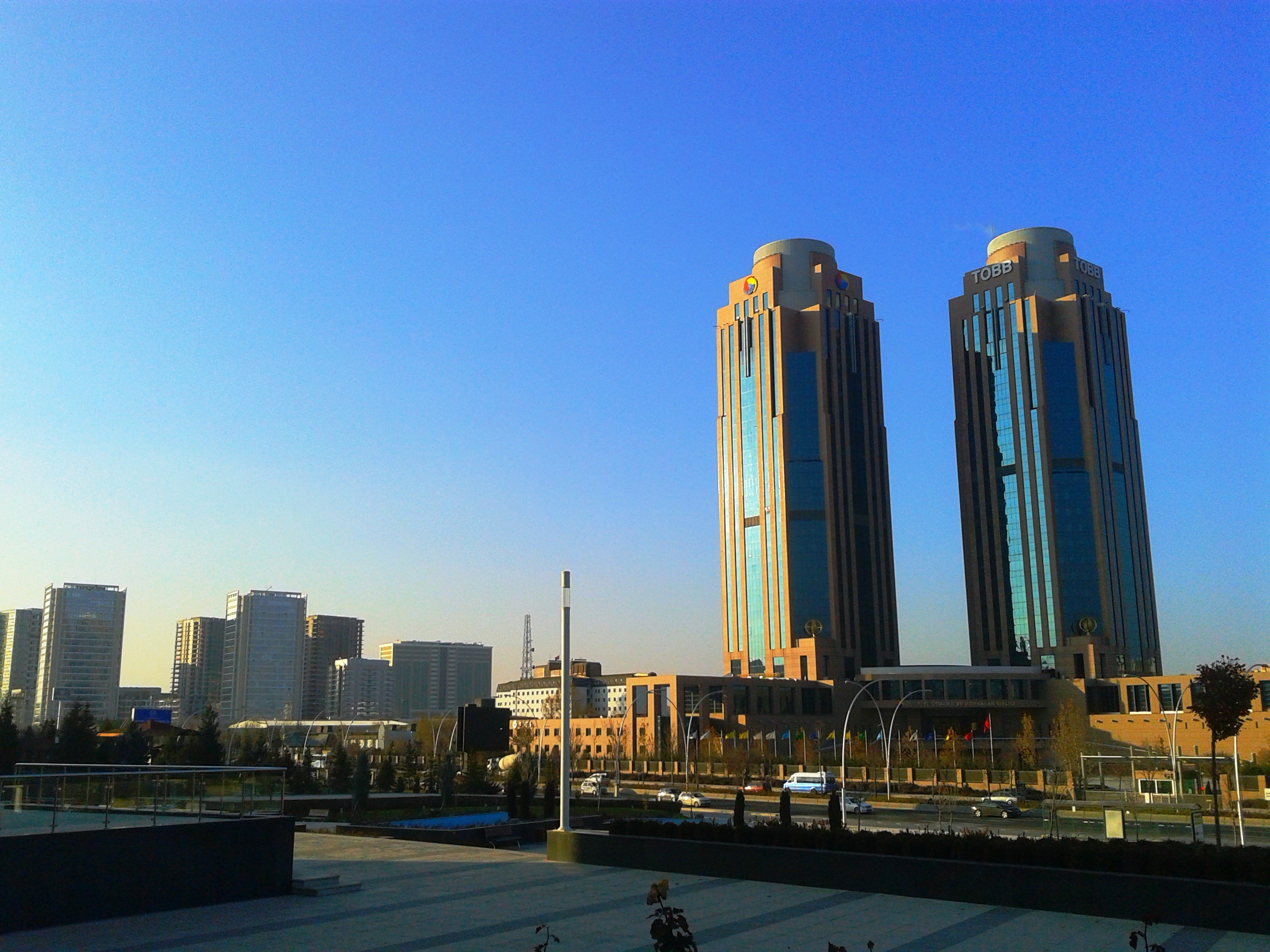
- Interactive map of the TOBB Towers area

General information
- Location: Ankara, Turkey
- Coordinates: 39°54′32″N 32°45′41″E
- Inaugurated: 2001
- Owner: Union of Chambers and Commodity Exchanges of Turkey

Height
- Height: 140 metres (460 ft)

Technical details
- Floor count: 34

TOBB Towers are 34 floor and 140 meters tall twin towers owned by Union of Chambers and Commodity Exchanges of Turkey on İsmet İnönü Boulevard in Ankara, Turkey. By 2020, they are still one of the tallest buildings in Ankara.
