= Akarlar, Çankaya =

Akarlar
- Neighbourhood
- Location in Turkey Akarlar (Turkey Central Anatolia)
- Coordinates: 39°45′N 33°07′E
- Country: Turkey
- Province: Ankara
- District: Çankaya
- Population (2022): 79
- Time zone: UTC+3 (TRT)

Akarlar is a neighbourhood in the municipality and district of Çankaya, Ankara Province, Turkey. Its population is 79 (2022). In 2008 it passed from the Bala District to the Çankaya District.
