= Mebusevleri, Çankaya =

Mebusevleri
- Neighbourhood
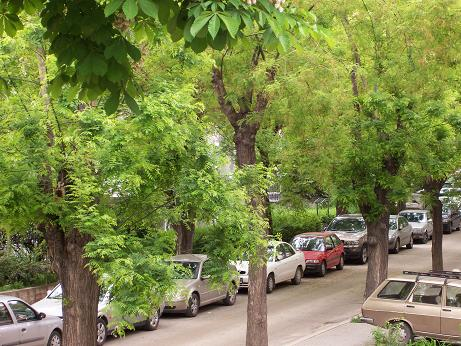

- Location within Turkey Location within Turkey Central Anatolia
- Coordinates: 39°56′N 32°50′E
- Country: Turkey
- Province: Ankara
- District: Çankaya
- Population (2022): 4,338
- Time zone: UTC+3 (TRT)

Mebusevleri is a neighbourhood in the municipality and district of Çankaya, Ankara Province, Turkey. Its population is 4,338 (2022). It is part of central Ankara.

Mebusevleri, which means "Houses of Parliamentarians", is bordered by Anıttepe, Tandoğan and Beşevler neighbourhoods. In addition to these neighbourhoods it is bordered by the Anıtkabir, the mausoleum of Atatürk.
