= Portakal Çiçeği Tower =

Tower in Ankara, Turkey

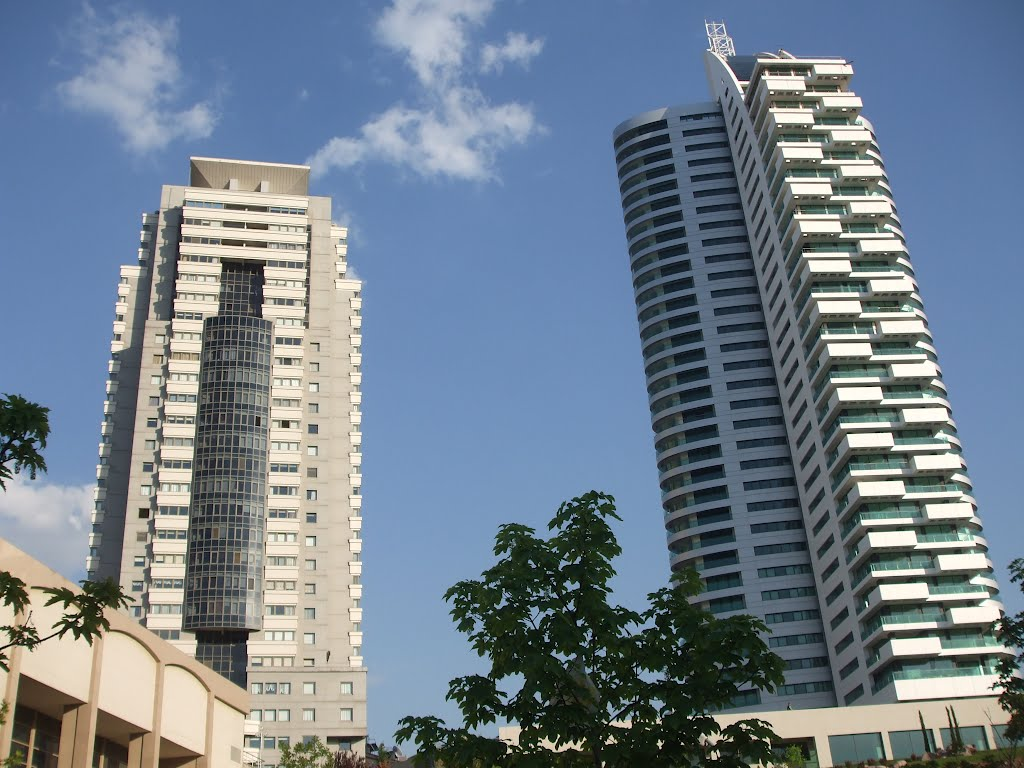
Portakal Çiçeği Tower (Right).

The Portakal Çiçeği Tower is a residential tower in Ankara, Turkey which held the record for tallest building in Ankara from its completion in 2009 till 2014 when it was surpassed by the Turk Telekom Tower. Currently it is the 9th tallest building in Ankara.

The tower is 160 meters tall and including the antenna 161 meters. It is built on a 5.913 meter square plot, its net floor space is 40.380 meters squared. The Architect who designed the building is Semra Teber. The residential tower has a steel and glass constructed terrace with garden on the 32 floor. The 42 floored building has 5 of its floors under ground level. According to up-to-date lists it is Turkeys 57th and Ankaras 9th tallest building.

== See also ==
- List of tallest buildings in Ankara
