= Sheraton Ankara =

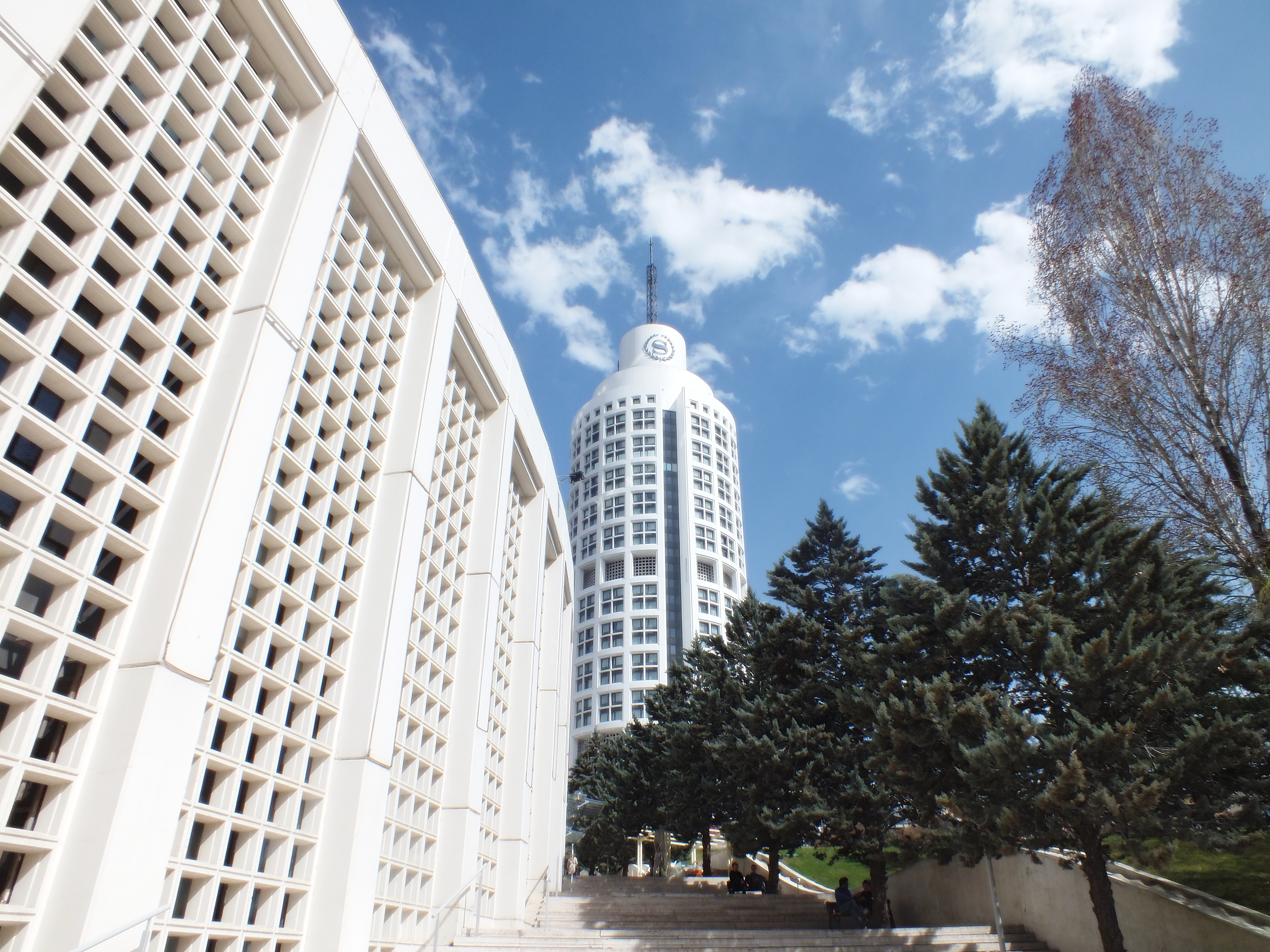
- A view of Sheraton Ankara (the cylindrical building) from the northwest. The building to the left is the Karum Mall.
- Interactive map of the Sheraton Ankara area

General information
- Location: Ankara, Turkey
- Coordinates: 39.9000761°N 32.8647933°E
- Opening: 1991
- Owner: Sheraton Turkey
- Management: Nurol Holding

Height
- Height: 143 m (469 ft)

Technical details
- Floor count: 29

Design and construction
- Architect: Gerkan, Marg and Partners

The Sheraton Ankara is a hotel and convention center in Ankara, Turkey. It is run by Sheraton Hotels and Resorts and is located in the Kavaklıdere quarter of central Ankara, near the city's central business district. The complex, which comprises a skyscraper (the hotel tower) and the adjacent convention center building, was opened in 1991. It was designed by the German architecture firm Gerkan, Marg and Partners. According to the architecture firm, the shape of the tower is inspired by a wine bottle, due to its location right next to the Kavaklıdere winery.

With a total of 29 floors above ground and a structural height of 143 metres (469 ft), Sheraton Ankara was the tallest skyscraper in Ankara between 1991 and 2009, and the tallest skyscraper in the Central Anatolia Region between 1991 and 2006. The hotel formerly consisted of two separate wings: the older cylindrical building, and the newer cube-shaped building next to it that was built in 2005. Both wings were considered a part of The Luxury Collection soft brand, despite its name, but since 2011, the new wing has been separated into a new hotel called Lugal, a Luxury Collection Hotel, while the older wing has been returned to the Sheraton brand. The hotel is connected to the Karum Mall, also opened in 1991.

== See also ==
- Çankaya
