= Turkish Revenue Administration =

- Gelir İdaresi Başkanlığı (GİB)

Agency overview
- Formed: 16 May 2005; 21 years ago
- Jurisdiction: Turkey
- Agency executive: Commissioner, Bekir Bayrakdar
- Parent agency: Ministry of Treasury and Finance
- Website: www.gib.gov.tr

The Revenue Administration is a public institution of Republic of Turkey operating under Ministry of Treasury and Finance. The Revenue Administration is responsible for levying and collecting state taxes and respecting the taxpayer rights within the framework of Constitutional Law and tax legislation.

== History ==
The first fiscal organization in Ottoman Empire was established in the time of sultan Murad I (1359-1389). This organization had been developed as a result of the rise in revenues and expenditures of the empire during the period of Mehmed II and Suleiman the Magnificent. However, there was not exactly a ministry of finance in Ottoman Empire until 1838. The Ministry of Finance was officially established in 1838. The ministry consisted of departments (daire) under the leaderships of chiefs (reis). In broader sense, today’s Revenue Administration’s duties in general were carried out by these departments. In 1881, the Ministry of Finance was divided into two as central administration and affiliated administrations. In 1908, during the constitutional monarchy era, the mission and organization of the Ministry of Finance substantially changed. The ministry was composed of eight directorates including general directorate of revenue administration according to the proposal of Monsieur Loran, financial consultant in that era. In the first Turkish National Grand Assembly the law firstly accepted was a tax law. Despite the fact that the Ministry of Finance was organized in 1923 after Turkish Republic was founded, the Code on the Ministry of Finance and Its Duties was accepted in 1936. The General Directorate of Revenues was established with the law in 1946. In 2005, the General Directorate of Revenue has been abolished and the Presidency of Revenue Administration has been established as a public institution of the Ministry of Finance.

== Administrative structure ==
Revenue Administration is organized as a headquarter and directly connected local units at the provincial level, with 448 tax offices and around 40.000 employees.

=== Central organization ===
The organization of the headquarters consists of main services, consulting and facilitation units.

Main Service Units

- Department of Revenue Management
- Department of Taxpayer Services
- Department of Implementation and Data Management
- Department of Collection and Disputed Cases
- Department of Audit and Compliance Management
- Department of EU and Foreign Affairs

Consulting Units

- Department of Strategy Development
- Department of Legal Consultancy
- Department of Consultancy on Media and Public Relations

Facilitation Services

- Department of Human Resources
- Department of Support Services

==== Tax Communication Center ====
Tax Communication Center (444 0 189-VİMER), which is a call center affiliated to Revenue Administration, has receiving all calls from Turkey since March 1, 2008. Tax Communication Center provides consulting services about tax-related issues, denunciation management and motor vehicle tax issues. Also, Tax Communication Center provides consulting services to foreigners via e-Mail Service in English.

=== Local organization ===
According to the 5345 numbered Law on the Organization and Duties of Revenue Administration, local administration consists of 30 Tax Office Directorates in 29 cities and 52 provincial offices.

Tax Office directorates are consist of group directorates, sub-directorates, sub-units, tax offices and commissions. The cities where the tax office directorates are as follows: Adana, Ankara, Antalya, Aydın, Balıkesir, Bursa, Denizli, Diyarbakır, Edirne, Erzurum, Eskişehir, Gaziantep, Hatay, Istanbul, İzmir, Kahramanmaraş, Kayseri, Konya, Kocaeli, Malatya, Manisa, Mersin, Muğla, Samsun, Sakarya, Şanlıurfa, Tekirdağ, Trabzon and Zonguldak.

== Duties ==
Revenue Administration has the following duties:

- Implementing revenue policy with justice and impartiality
- Collecting taxes and other revenues with the least cost;
- Ensuring tax compliance of taxpayers;
- To take necessary measures in order to protect taxpayers rights
- To inform taxpayers on their rights and responsibilities
- To participate to the preparation of law and decree on state revenue policies
- To provide collection of public revenues and to take necessary measures on that issue
- Collecting the data on taxation, and managing the Information Technologies.
- To take necessary precautions for preventing tax loss and tax evasion.
- To follow the international developments and to cooperate with the EU and other international organizations and foreign countries, on the issues that are in the scope of the duties.

== Commissioners ==
- Osman Arıoğlu (17 May 2005 – 16 November 2007)
- Mehmet Akif Ulusoy (16 November 2007 – 16 March 2009)
- Mehmet Kılcı (16 March 2009 – 5 May 2014)
- Adnan Ertürk (5 May 2014 – 23 June 2018)
- Necmi Keskinsoy (25 June 2018 – 7 January 2019)
- Bekir Bayrakdar (7 January 2019 – present)

== Tax statistics ==
Tax statistics of OECD countries, budget revenues and statistical data on taxpayer declarations can be found on yearly basis at official website of Revenue Administration under “Tax Statistics” title.
