= Yayla, Çankaya =

Yayla
- Neighbourhood
- Country: Turkey
- Province: Ankara
- District: Çankaya
- Population (2022): 238
- Time zone: UTC+3 (TRT)

Yayla is a neighbourhood in the municipality and district of Çankaya, Ankara Province, Turkey. Its population is 238 (2022). In 2008 it passed from the Bala District to the Çankaya District.
