= Evciler, Çankaya =

Evciler
- Neighbourhood
- Location in Turkey Evciler (Turkey Central Anatolia)
- Coordinates: 39.7794°N 33.0377°E
- Country: Turkey
- Province: Ankara
- District: Çankaya
- Population (2022): 149
- Time zone: UTC+3 (TRT)

Evciler is a neighbourhood in the municipality and district of Çankaya, Ankara Province, Turkey. Its population is 149 (2022). In 2008 it passed from the Bala District to the Çankaya District.
