= Atakule =

Tower in Ankara, Turkey

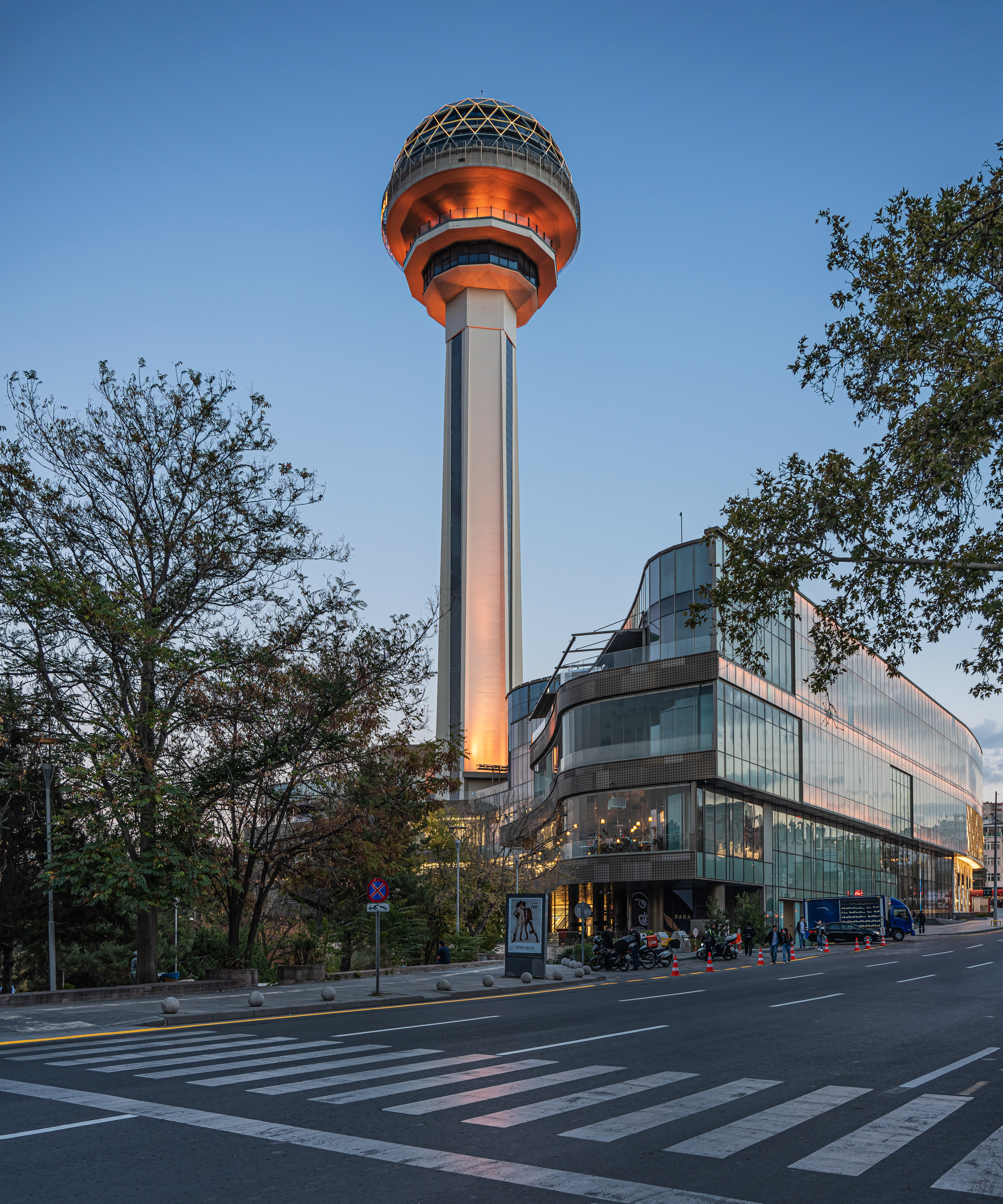
- The tower, pictured in 2021
- Interactive map of the Atakule area

General information
- Type: Observation tower Communications tower Shopping mall Restaurant
- Location: Ankara, Turkey
- Coordinates: 39°53′10″N 32°51′22″E
- Opening: 13 October 1989

Height
- Roof: 125 m (410 ft)

Technical details
- Floor count: 4

Design and construction
- Architect: Ragıp Buluç

Atakule is a 125 m (410 ft) high communications and observation tower located in the Çankaya district of central Ankara, Turkey, and is one of the primary landmarks of the city. As the district of Çankaya is itself on a hill, the tower can be spotted from almost anywhere in the city during clear days. The tower was opened on 13 October 1989 by Prime Minister Turgut Özal.

The tower's design came from architect Ragıp Buluç and the construction works lasted from 1987 to 1989. The top section of the tower houses an open terrace and a revolving restaurant named Sevilla, which makes a 360-degree rotation in one hour. On top of Sevilla is another restaurant, Dome, which is non-revolving and located directly under the cupola. Under the terrace is a café, named UFO. The bottom structures house a shopping mall and several indoor and outdoor restaurants.

The Turkish word ata means "ancestor" (or "father" in Old Turkic), which is often used as a nickname (Ata) for Mustafa Kemal Atatürk, the founder and first President of the Republic of Turkey; while the word kule means "tower".

== Atrium shopping mall ==
The shopping mall adjacent to the tower, Atrium, was also opened on 13 October 1989. It was the first modern mall in Ankara and the second in Turkey after Galleria in Istanbul, which was opened in 1987. The shopping mall was closed due to loss of popularity in the face of competition from an increasing number of more modern shopping malls in the city. It was demolished and rebuilt as a contemporary style shopping mall. Atakule shopping mall reopened on 29 October 2018, combining its original character with modern architecture, design, and technology, reflecting the international character of Ankara.

== See also ==
- List of tallest buildings in Ankara
