= Çankaya District =

Çankaya
- District and municipality
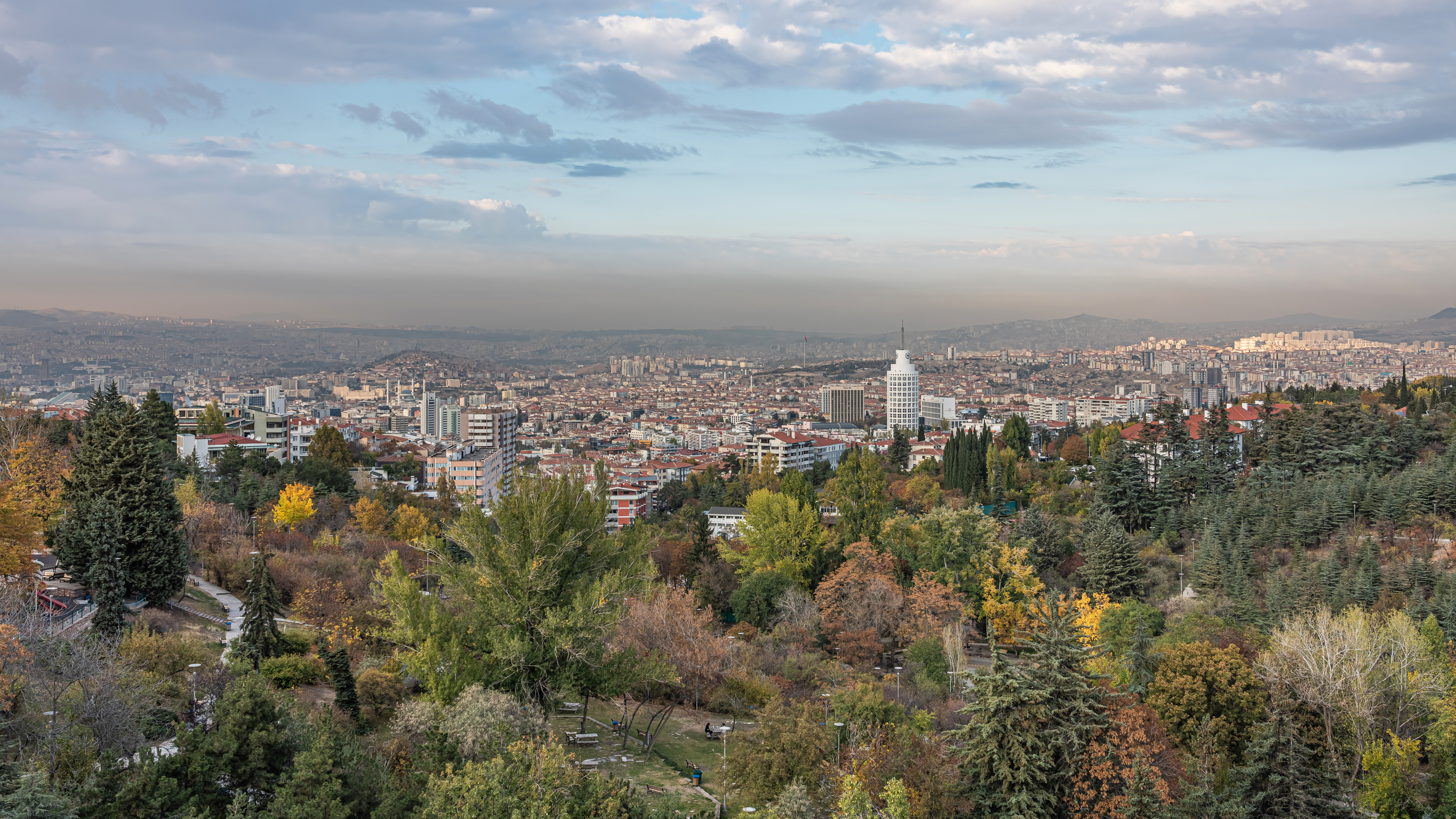

- Flag Logo

- Map showing Çankaya District in Ankara Province

- Location within Turkey Location within Turkey Central Anatolia
- Coordinates: 39°55′28″N 32°53′08″E
- Country: Turkey
- Province: Ankara

Government
  - Mayor: Haldun Güler (acting) (Yeni Parti)
- Area: 483 km^{2} (186 sq mi)
- Elevation: 1,084 m (3,556 ft)
- Population (2022): 942,553
  - Density: 1,950/km^{2} (5,050/sq mi)
- Time zone: UTC+3 (TRT)
- Area code: 0312
- Website: www.cankaya.bel.tr

Çankaya is a municipality and district of Ankara Province, Turkey. Its area is 483 km^{2}, and its population is 942,553 (2022). It is home to many government buildings, including the Grand National Assembly of Turkey, as well as nearly all foreign embassies to Turkey. Çankaya is a cosmopolitan district and considered the cultural and financial center of Ankara. As of 2025 it was the most socioecomomically developed district in the country, it likely has the highest HDI too.

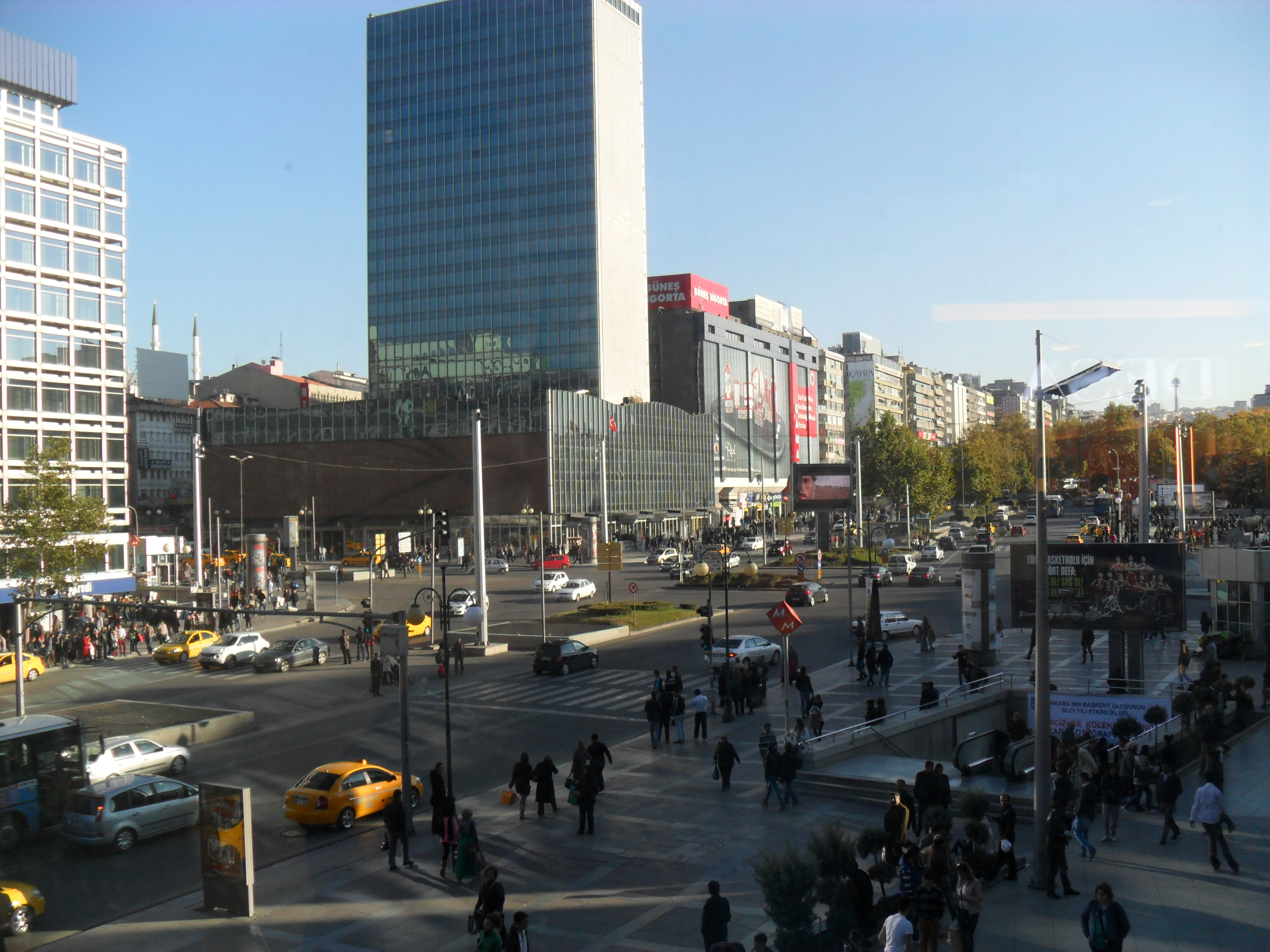
A view of Kızılay Square from the northwest, with the Kızılay Emek Business Center Emek Business Center (1959–1965).

== History ==
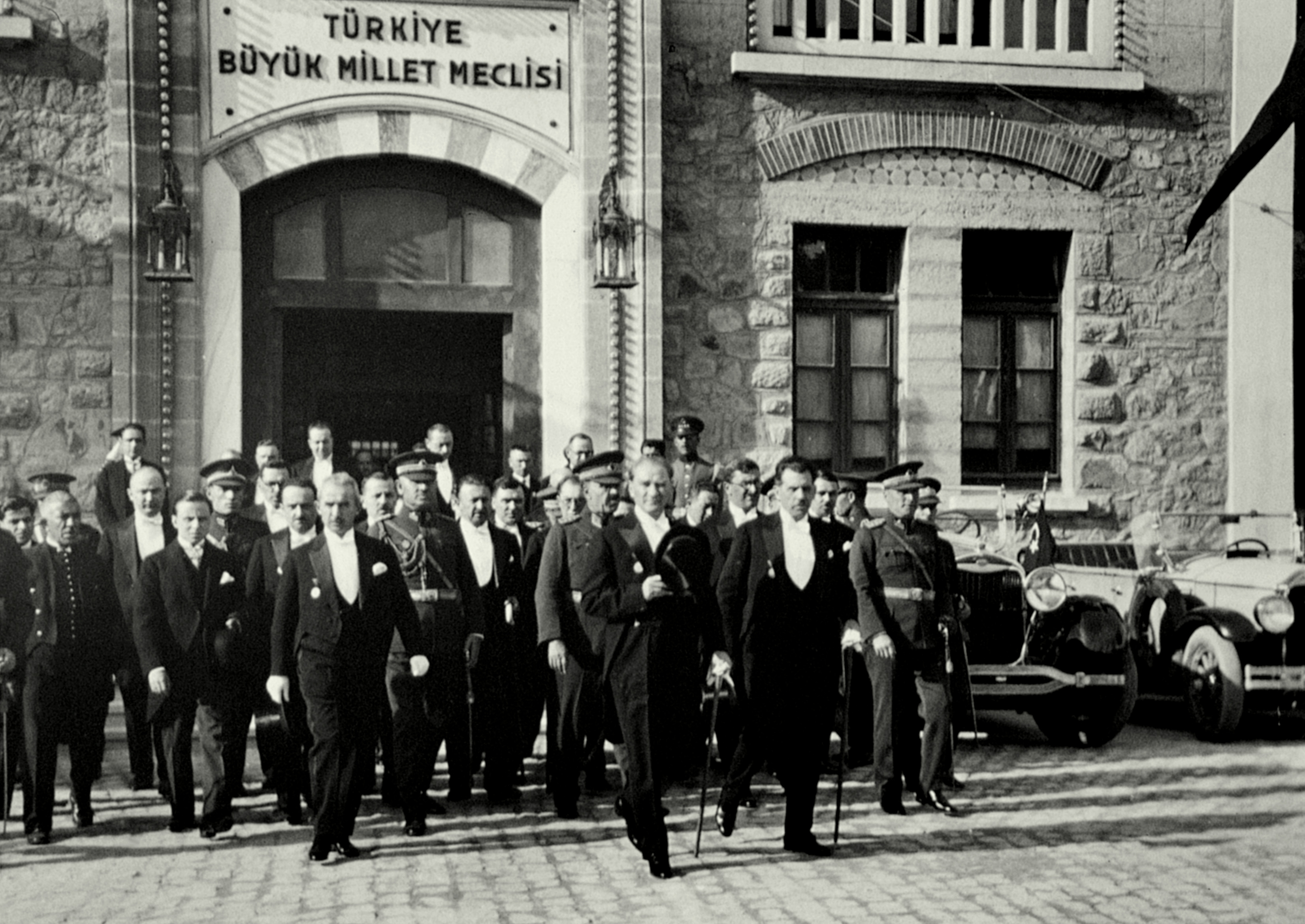
President Atatürk and his colleagues leaving the building of the Grand National Assembly of Turkey (1930).

Until the founding of the Republic of Turkey in 1923, Çankaya was a hillside of orchards and gardens to the south of the city, which had grown up in time, surrounding the Ankara Castle (Kale) on the opposite hill. Everything changed in the 1920s when Mustafa Kemal Atatürk came to stay in one of the garden houses. Atatürk selected Ankara as capital of the new republic and in the 1920s and 30s the city quickly grew, especially in the direction of Çankaya. In 1934 the writer Yakup Kadri Karaosmanoğlu described the area as "a wooden bridge, a dirt road, and when you come round the hill you see a hillside, green in gentle contours. That's Çankaya." Çankaya eventually developed into one of the largest central districts of Ankara in later years.

== Demographics ==
The population of Çankaya is close to 1 million in 2022.

Historical population
Year	Pop.	±% p.a.
2007	792,189	—
2012	832,075	+0.99%
2017	921,999	+2.07%
2022	942,553	+0.44%
Source: TÜIK (2007-2022)

== Climate ==
The climate in Çankaya is continental and semi-arid. The spring months are the wettest, whereas the summer months are the driest in Çankaya. The winter months receive snow, though it also occurs in November, March and April. The Köppen-Geiger climate classification is BSk. The average annual temperature in Çankaya is 11.5 °C. In a year, the average precipitation is 384 mm.

Climate data for Çankaya (1950 - 2014)
Month	Jan	Feb	Mar	Apr	May	Jun	Jul	Aug	Sep	Oct	Nov	Dec	Year
Mean daily maximum °C (°F)	3.8 (38.8)	6.6 (43.9)	12.1 (53.8)	17.4 (63.3)	22.2 (72.0)	26.4 (79.5)	30.1 (86.2)	29.6 (85.3)	25.7 (78.3)	19.7 (67.5)	13.2 (55.8)	6.4 (43.5)	17.7 (63.9)
Daily mean °C (°F)	−0.1 (31.8)	2.2 (36.0)	6.3 (43.3)	11.1 (52.0)	15.4 (59.7)	19.0 (66.2)	22.4 (72.3)	21.8 (71.2)	17.8 (64.0)	12.5 (54.5)	7.3 (45.1)	2.6 (36.7)	11.5 (52.7)
Mean daily minimum °C (°F)	−4.0 (24.8)	−2.1 (28.2)	0.5 (32.9)	4.8 (40.6)	8.6 (47.5)	11.6 (52.9)	14.7 (58.5)	14.0 (57.2)	10.0 (50.0)	5.3 (41.5)	1.4 (34.5)	−1.1 (30.0)	5.9 (42.6)
Average precipitation mm (inches)	42.2 (1.66)	37.0 (1.46)	38.8 (1.53)	47.7 (1.88)	49.7 (1.96)	35.0 (1.38)	14.5 (0.57)	10.5 (0.41)	19.2 (0.76)	29.4 (1.16)	32.6 (1.28)	45.4 (1.79)	402 (15.84)
Average precipitation days	12.2	11.0	10.9	11.9	12.5	8.6	3.7	2.8	3.9	6.8	8.5	11.8	104.6
Mean monthly sunshine hours	77.5	98.9	161.2	189.0	260.4	306.0	350.3	328.6	276.0	198.4	132.0	71.3	2,449.6
Source: "Resmi İstatistikler (İl ve İlçelerimize Ait İstatistiki Veriler)". en.climate-data.org.

== Culture ==
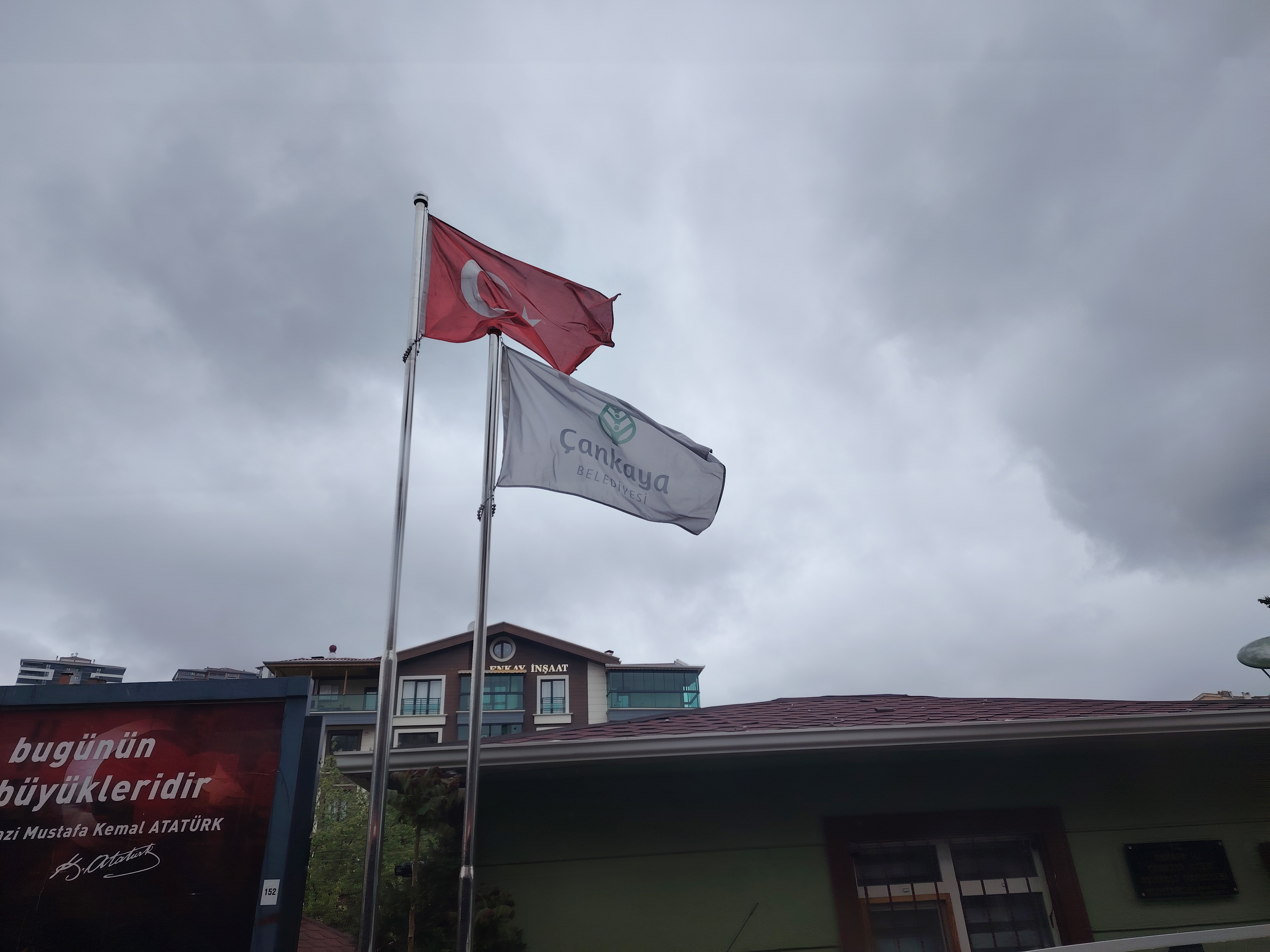
Turkish Flag and Flag of Çankaya

The early buildings of the republic were in grand Ottoman style, but today Çankaya also contains a number of modern buildings. The district is home to a great number of museums, theatres, cinemas, cultural associations, booksellers, publishers and libraries, including the National Library in a new building. Many of the streets in the district are named after poets, writers and thinkers.

Most of Ankara's best-known high schools and a great number of university buildings are in the district, including the large campuses of METU, Bilkent University and (most of) Hacettepe University. Çankaya University, a private institution owned by businessman Sıtkı Alp, was opened in a number of former school buildings in 1997. The district also houses many important government buildings.

== Composition ==
There are 124 neighbourhoods in Çankaya District:

- 100.Yıl
- 50.Yıl
- Ahlatlıbel
- Akarlar
- Akpınar
- Alacaatlı
- Anıttepe
- Arka Topraklık
- Aşağı Dikmen
- Aşağı Imrahor
- Aşağı Öveçler
- Aşıkpaşa
- Ata
- Aydınlar
- Ayrancı
- Aziziye
- Bademlidere
- Bağcılar
- Bahçelievler
- Balgat
- Barbaros
- Bayraktar
- Beytepe
- Birlik
- Boztepe
- Büyükesat
- Çamlıtepe
- Çankaya
- Çavuşlu
- Çayyolu
- Cebeci
- Cevizlidere
- Çiğdem
- Çukurambar
- Cumhuriyet
- Devlet
- Dilekler
- Dodurga
- Doğuş
- Ehlibeyt
- Emek
- Ertuğrulgazi
- Erzurum
- Esatoğlu
- Eti
- Evciler
- Fakülteler
- Fidanlık
- Gaziosmanpaşa
- Gökkuşağı
- Göktürk
- Güvenevler
- Güzeltepe
- Harbiye
- Hilal
- Huzur
- İleri
- İlkadım
- İlkbahar
- İlker
- İncesu
- İşçi Blokları
- Karahasanlı
- Karapınar
- Karataş
- Kavaklıdere
- Kazım Özalp
- Keklik Pınarı
- Kırkkonaklar
- Kızılay
- Kızılırmak
- Kocatepe
- Kömürcü
- Konutkent
- Korkutreis
- Koru
- Küçükesat
- Kültür
- Malazgirt
- Maltepe
- Mebusevleri
- Meşrutiyet
- Metin Akkuş
- Metin Oktay
- Mimar Sinan
- Muhsin Ertuğrul
- Murat
- Mürsel Uluç
- Mustafa Kemal
- Mutlukent
- Naci Çakır
- Namık Kemal
- Nasuh Akar
- Oğuzlar
- Ön Cebeci
- Oran
- Orta Imrahor
- Osman Temiz
- Öveçler
- Prof. Dr. Ahmet Taner Kışlalı
- Remzi Oğuz Arık
- Sağlık
- Sancak
- Şehit Cengiz Karaca
- Şehit Cevdet Özdemir
- Seyranbağları
- Söğütözü
- Sokullu Mehmet Paşa
- Tınaztepe
- Tohumlar
- Topraklık
- Ümit
- Umut
- Üniversiteler
- Yakupabdal
- Yaşamkent
- Yayla
- Yeşilkent
- Yıldızevler
- Yücetepe
- Yukarı Bahçelievler
- Yukarı Dikmen
- Yukarı Öveçler
- Zafertepe
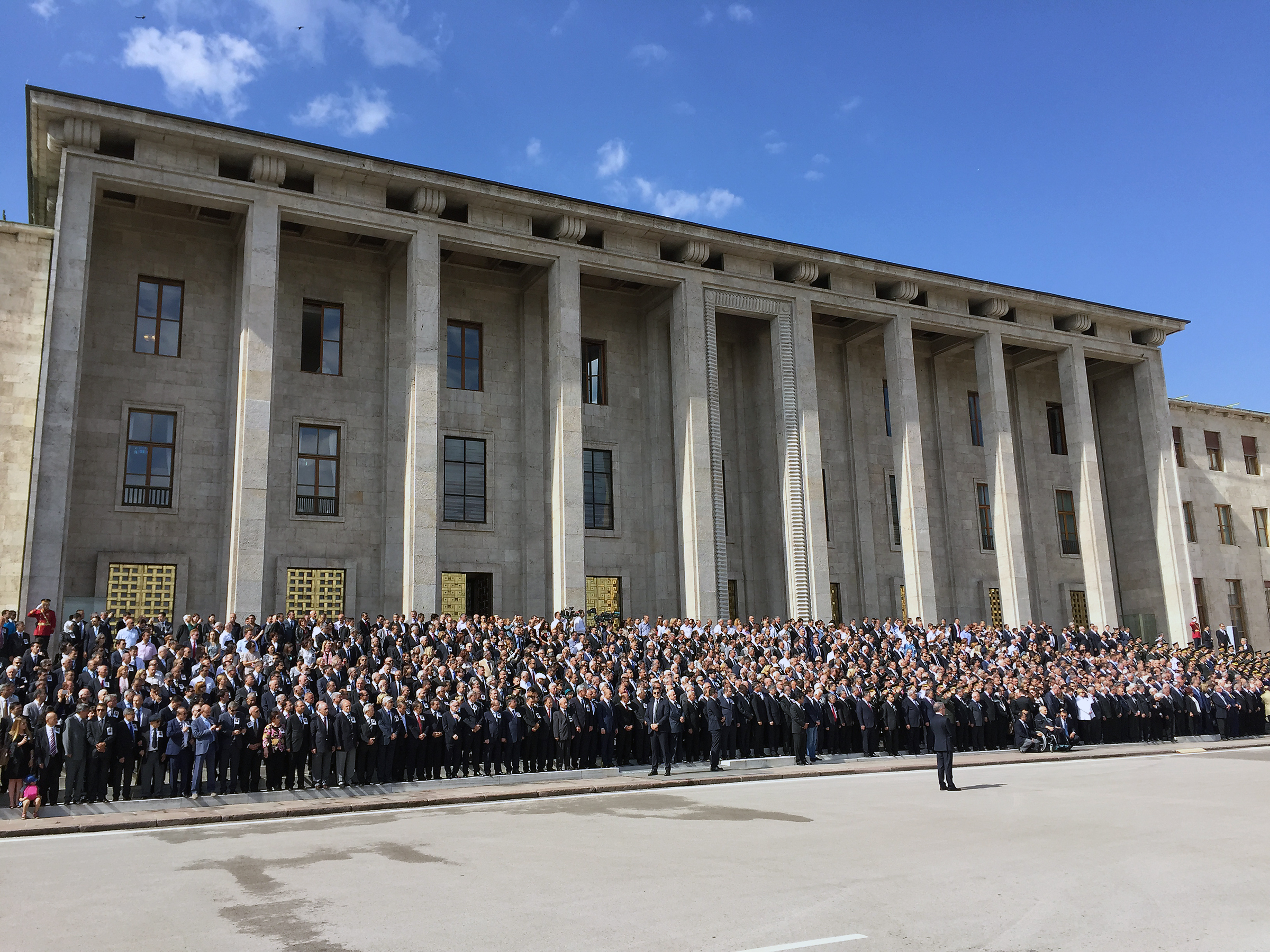
Grand National Assembly of Turkey

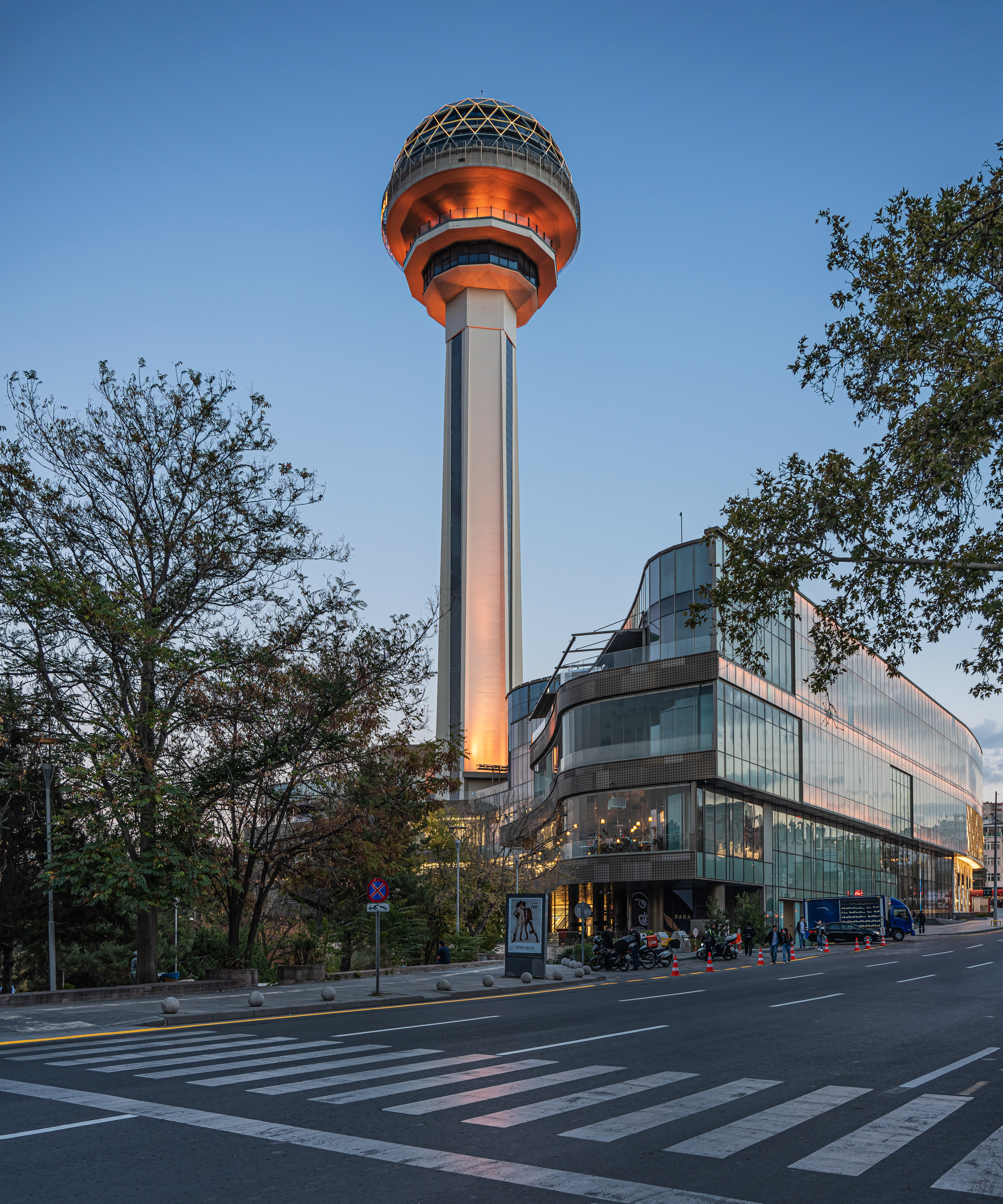
Atakule

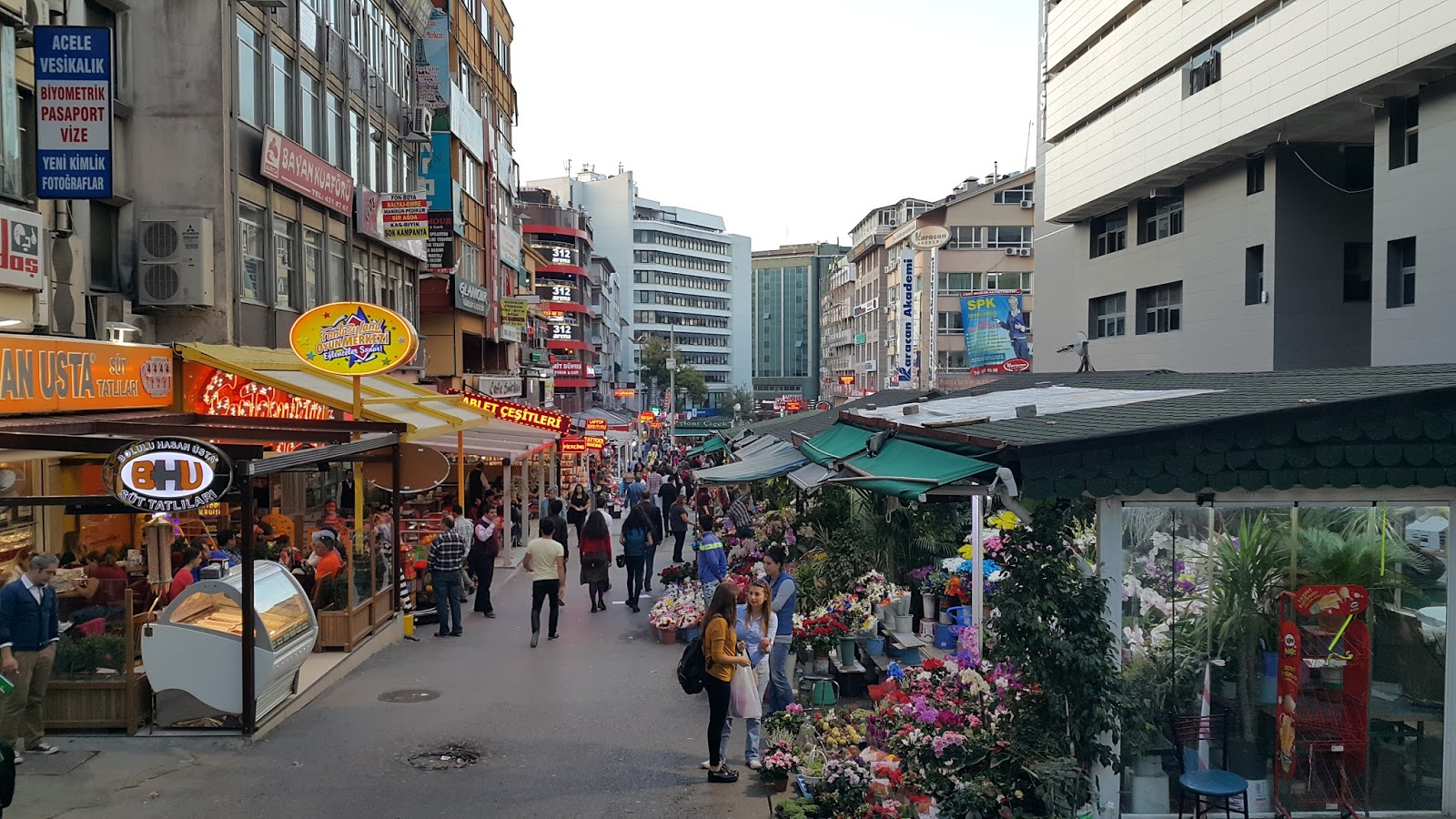
Kızılay

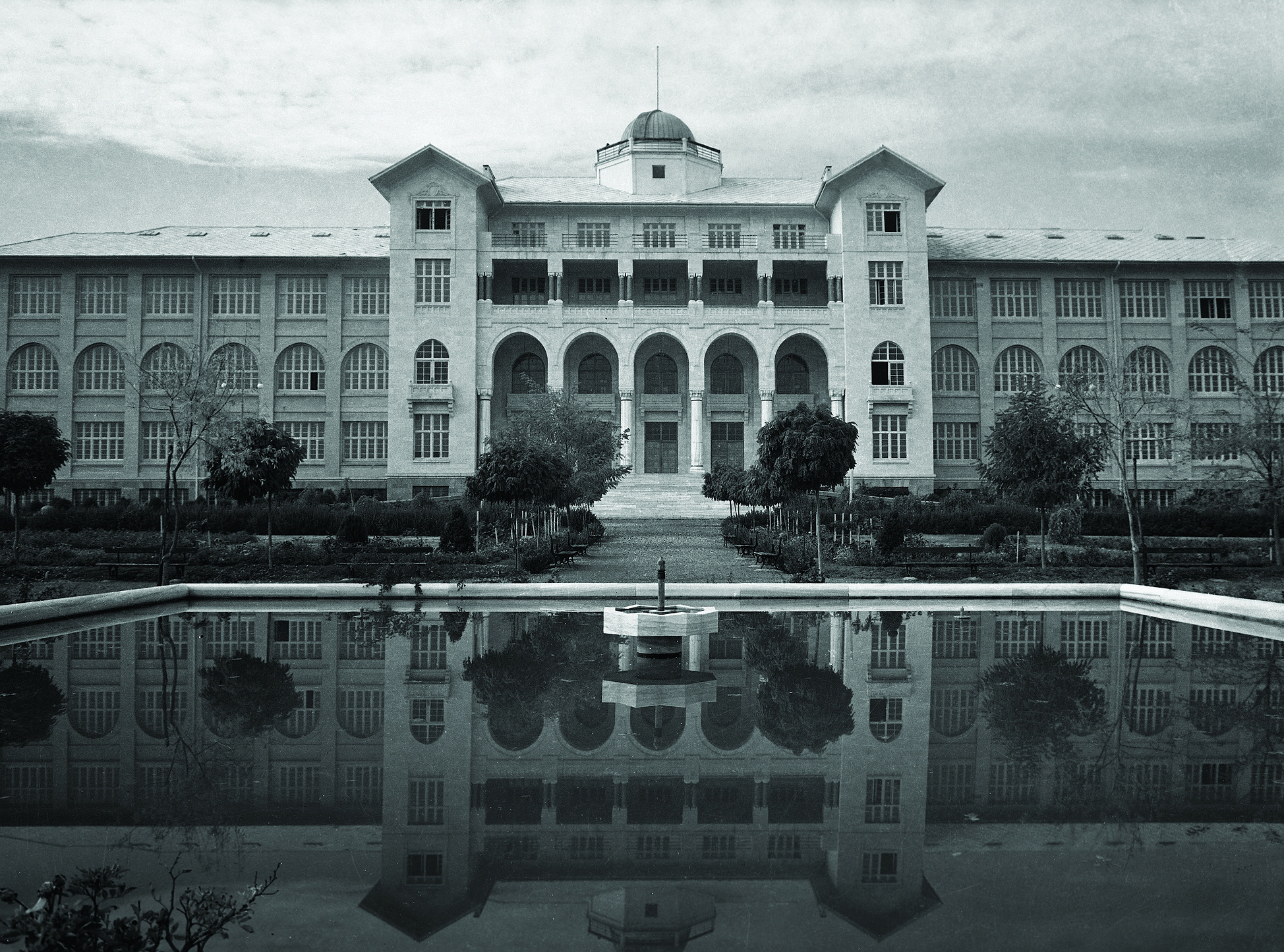
Gazi University

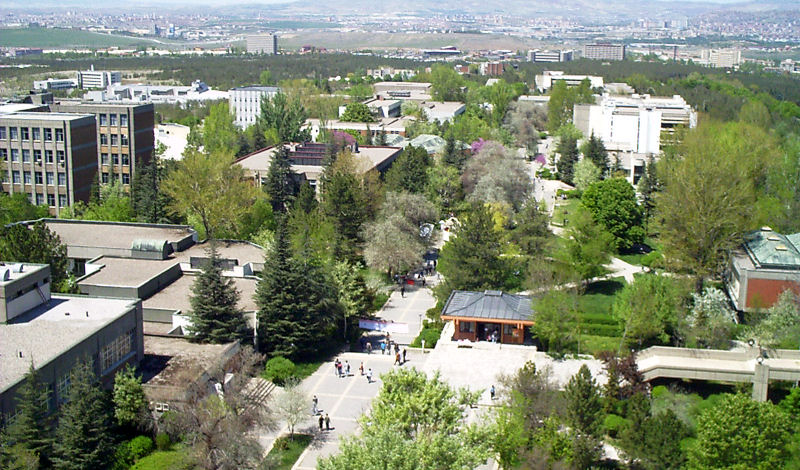
METU Campus

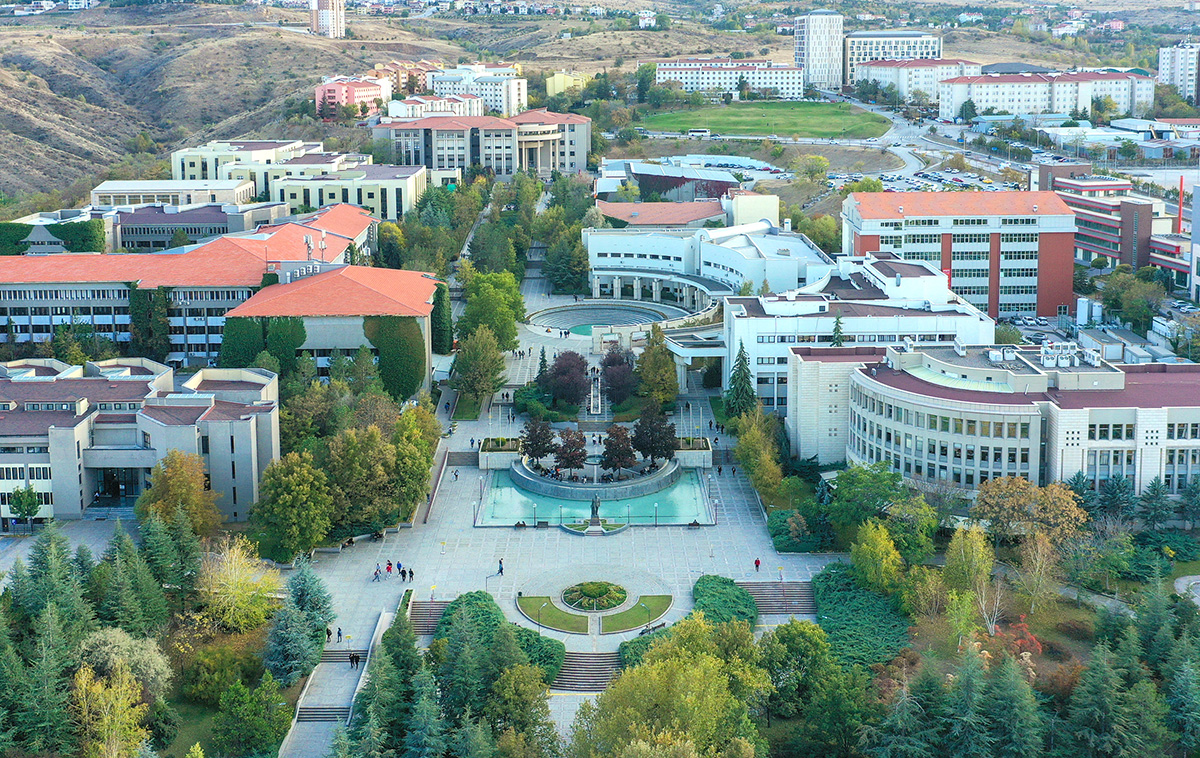
Bilkent University

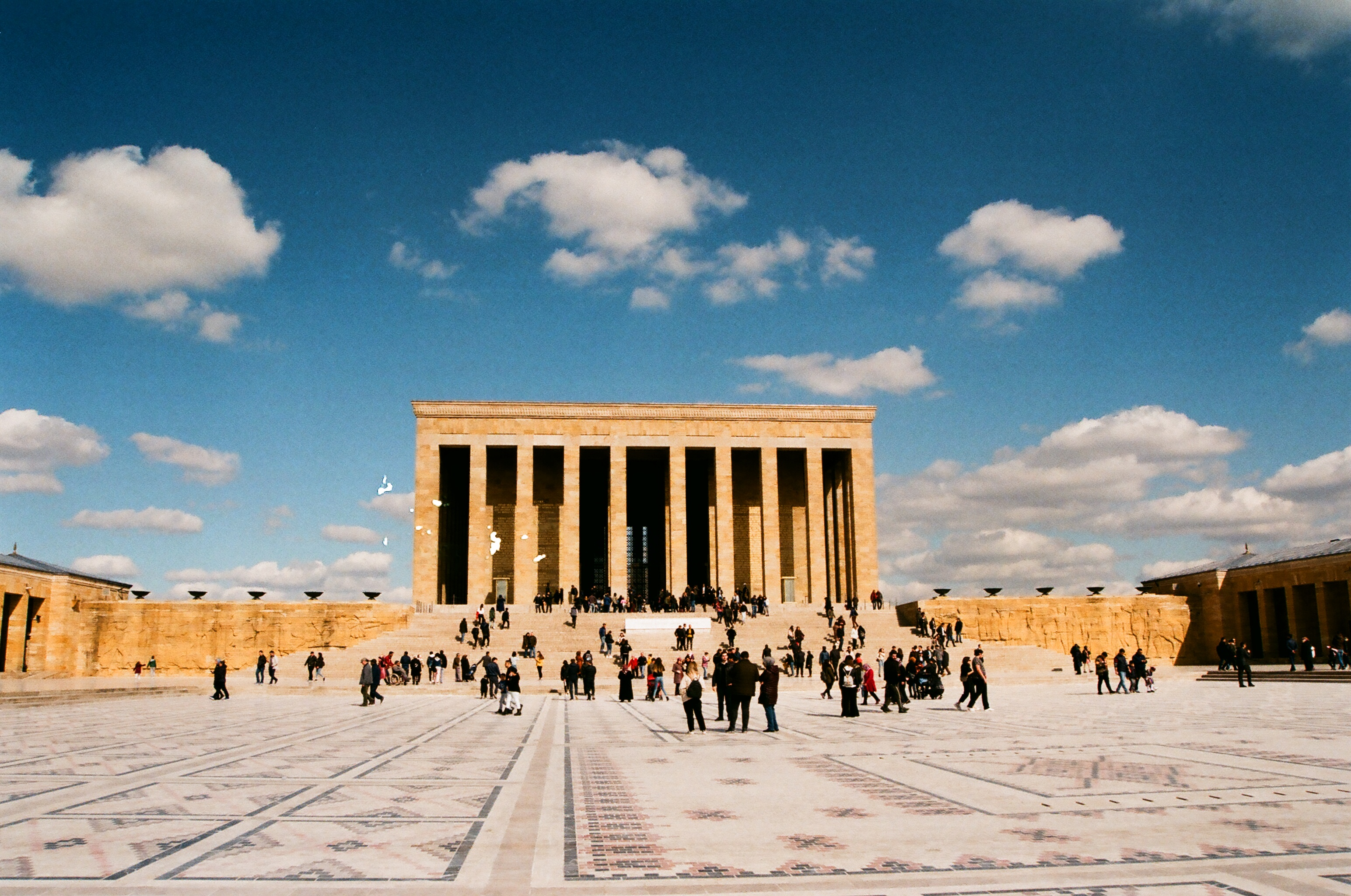
Anıtkabir

== Politics and government ==
Çankaya has always played an important role in politics, government, and diplomacy, as the Grand National Assembly is located in the district as well as the former residence of the President of Turkey. Various embassies can be found in the district.

Çankaya is an overwhelmingly CHP-voting district both in local and general elections. The party has majority when it comes to general elections. CHP holds a supermajority in Çankaya District Council, with 44 out of 47 members of the district council also being a member of the party.

In 2026, the Ministry of Interior deposed the mayor Hüseyin Can Güner so Haldun Güler was elected the acting mayor of Çankaya with 37 votes.

== Places of interest ==
- Anıtkabir the mausoleum of Atatürk, Turkey's founder
- Atakule Tower
- Çankaya Köşkü - the former residence of the President of Turkey
- Pembe Köşk - the residence of Turkish President İsmet İnönü from 1925 to 1973
- THF Sport Hall
