= St. Teresa's Catholic Church, Ankara =

Church building in Ulus, Turkey

St. Térèse Church
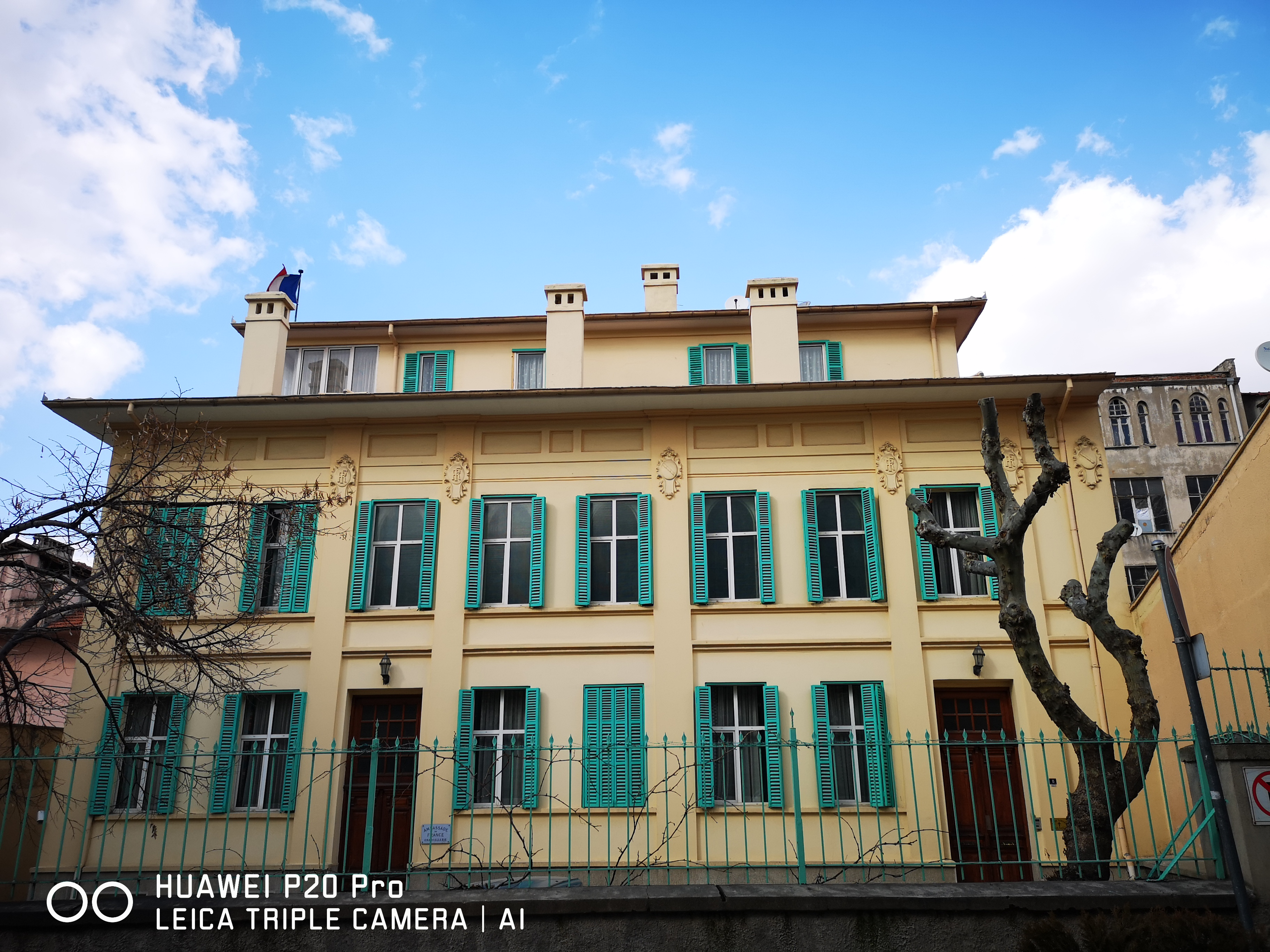
- View of Ankara St. Térèse Church

- Location in Turkey

Religion
- Affiliation: Catholic Church

Location
- Location: Kardeşler Sokak No:15 06250
- Municipality: Ulus, Ankara
- Country: Turkey
- Coordinates: 39.9355°N 32.8605°E

Architecture
- Type: Church

St. Térèse Church (Turkish: Azize Tereza Kilisesi) is a Catholic Church in Ankara, the capital of Turkey. It is dedicated to Saint Thérèse of Lisieux. It is one of two Catholic churches that provide services there, the other being located at the Nunciature of the Holy See.

== History ==
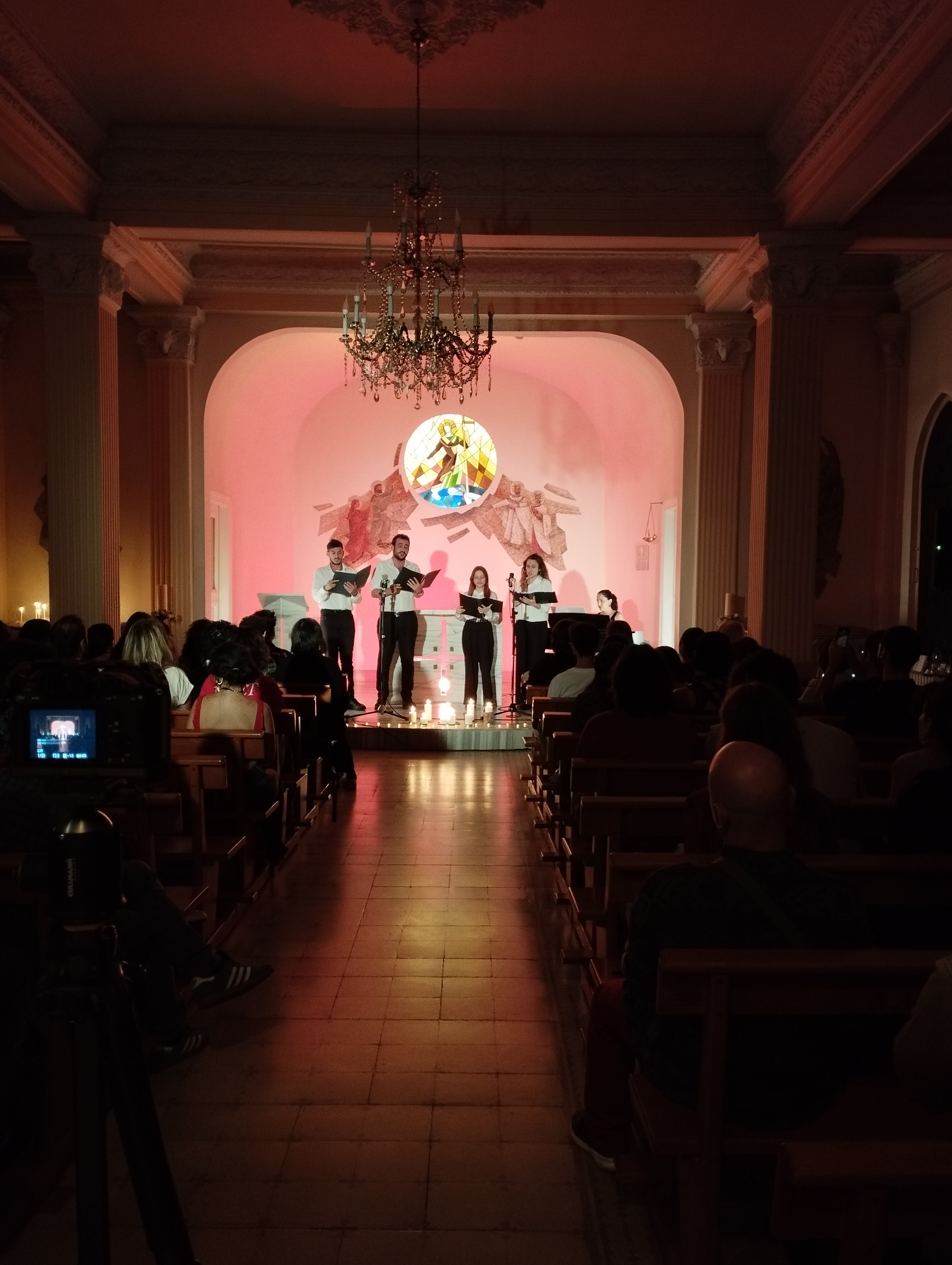
During a concert

The French College of St. Clement built in the 1880's under the direction of the Brothers of the Christian Schools was located here until 1915, when the neighborhood was close to the old Armenian quarter. The college and the surrounding neighborhood was largely destroyed in the Ankara fire of 1917. The same street was named Brothers Street (Kardeşler Sokak) in recognition of the work of the French religious brothers who taught there. A new building was erected in 1928 to serve for a year as the Chancery of the French embassy and, until 1962, as the French school for french diplomat children. In the same time it housed a small chapel on the second floor which remains until today.

The building underwent a general restoration in 2002. Its decoration includes a mosaic by the French artist Hervé Vital, based on those found in the churches of Cappadocia. The kings David and Solomon appear on the right. They point at Adam and Eve emerging from the tomb on the left and reaching for the hand of the risen Christ in the center. Other mosaics depict the Blessed Virgin holding the infant Jesus and Christ holding the Gospel in one hand and blessing with the other.

Six stained glass windows were constructed in 1914 in Bordeaux for the chapel of the French College in Izmit (Kocaeli), a school run by the Assomptionist fathers and preserved when that institution closed in 1920, then installed in St. Thérèse in 1952, joined by four more in the same style made in Florence.

== See also ==
- Christianity in Turkey
- Catholic Church in Turkey
