= Column of Julianus =

Roman monument in Ankara, Turkey

- Julianus Sütunu, Belkıs Minaresi (Turkish)
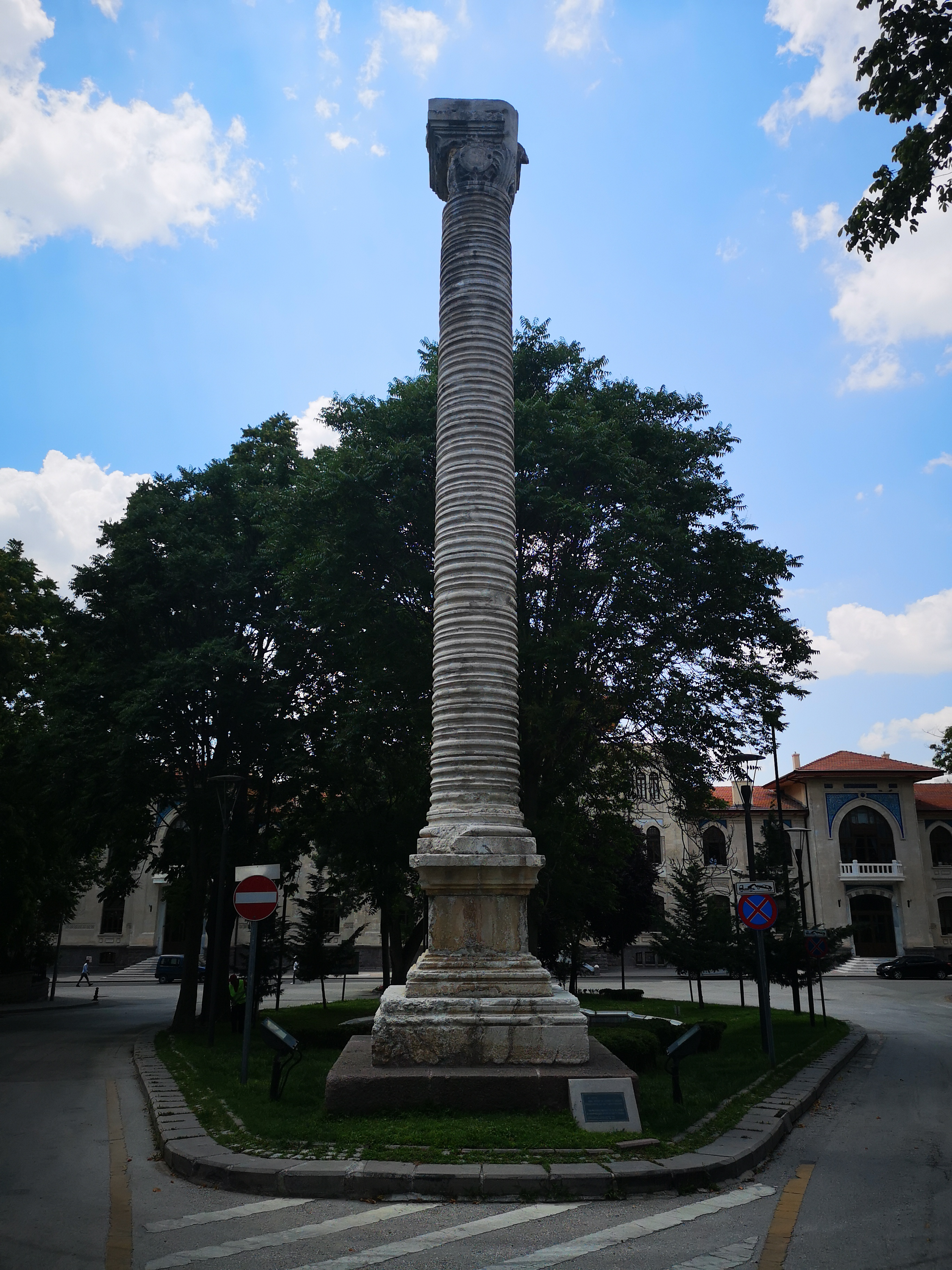
- Completion date: 360
- Type: Victory column Ancient Roman
- Medium: Stone
- Dimensions: 15 metres (50 ft)
- Condition: Renovated, 2001
- Location: Ankara, Turkey
- 39°56′35.72″N 32°51′22.41″E

Column of Julianus or the popularly known Belkıs Minaresi; It is a Victory column (or rather Monumental column) located in the Ulus district of Ankara, Turkey.

== History ==
Julianus, the last pagan Roman emperor, declared war on the Persians in 362 and created a route that would pass through Ankara. Upon the news that the emperor would take a break on the way to the expedition and stay in the city, preparations began in the whole city and the Julianus Column was erected to honor him. The Column of Julianus, which did not undergo any repairs or renovations for many years, was restored by the governorship in 2001.

== Architectural features ==
The column, which has a height of about 15 metres (50 ft), was built using masonry.

== Gallery ==
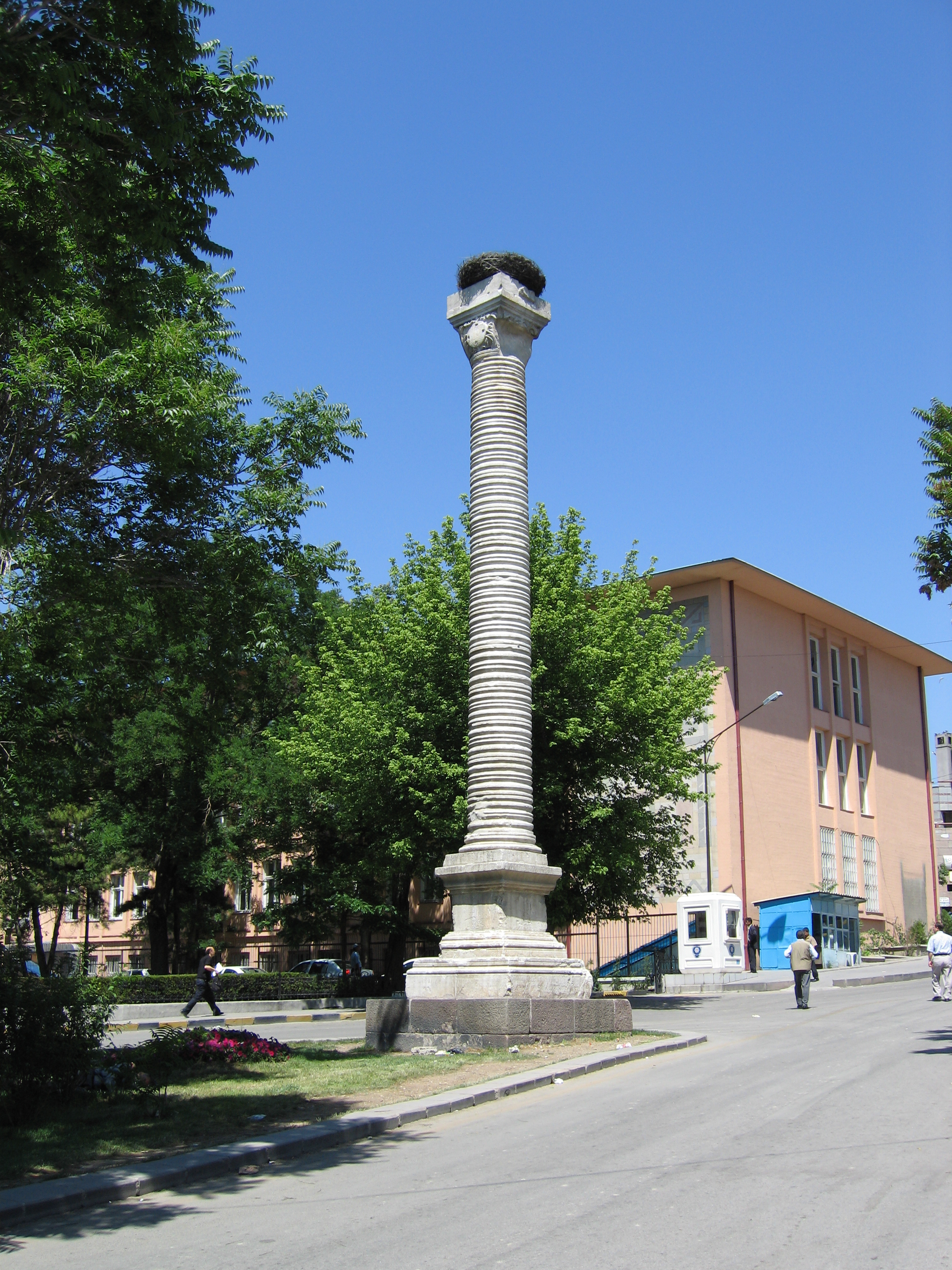

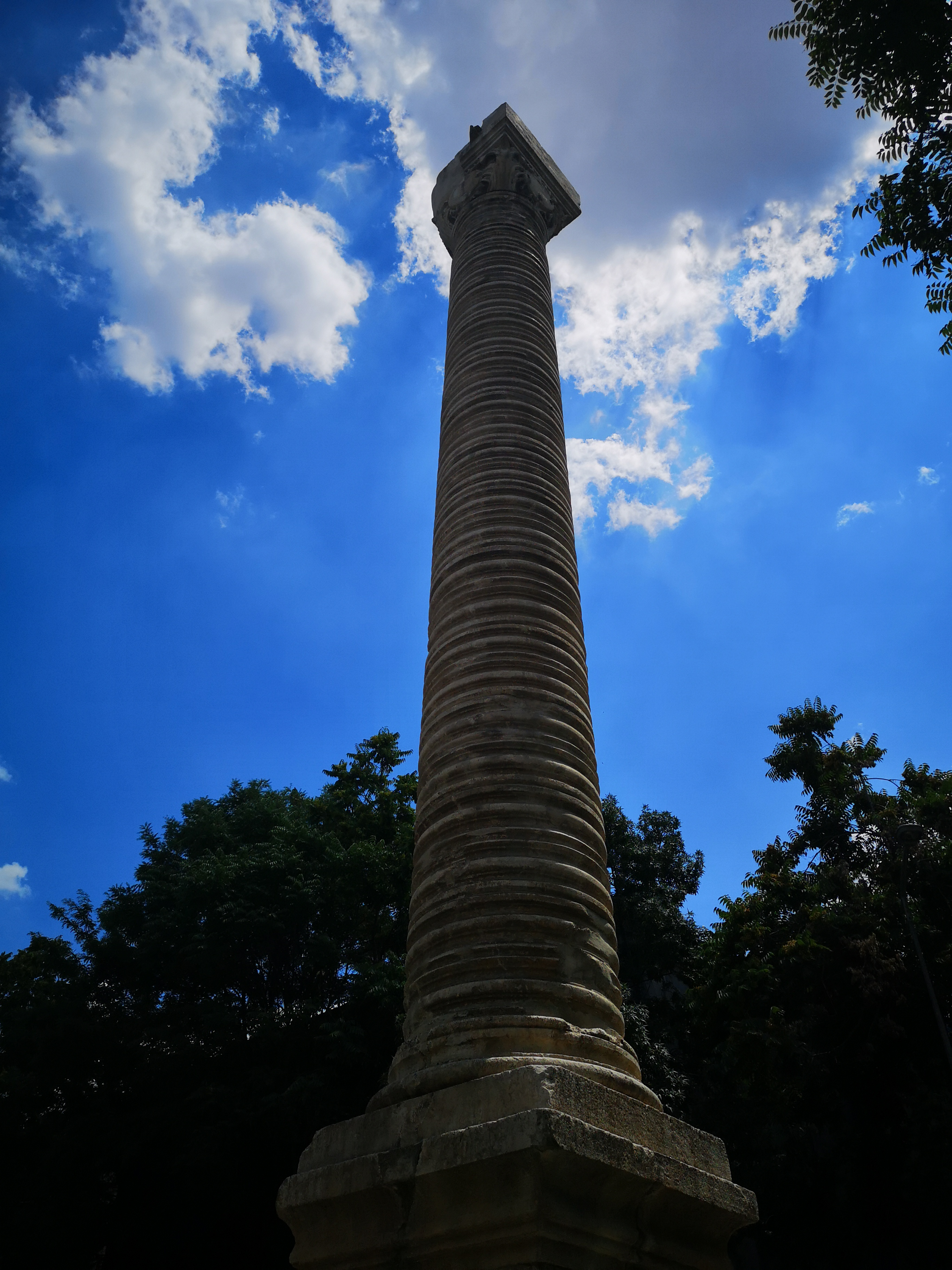

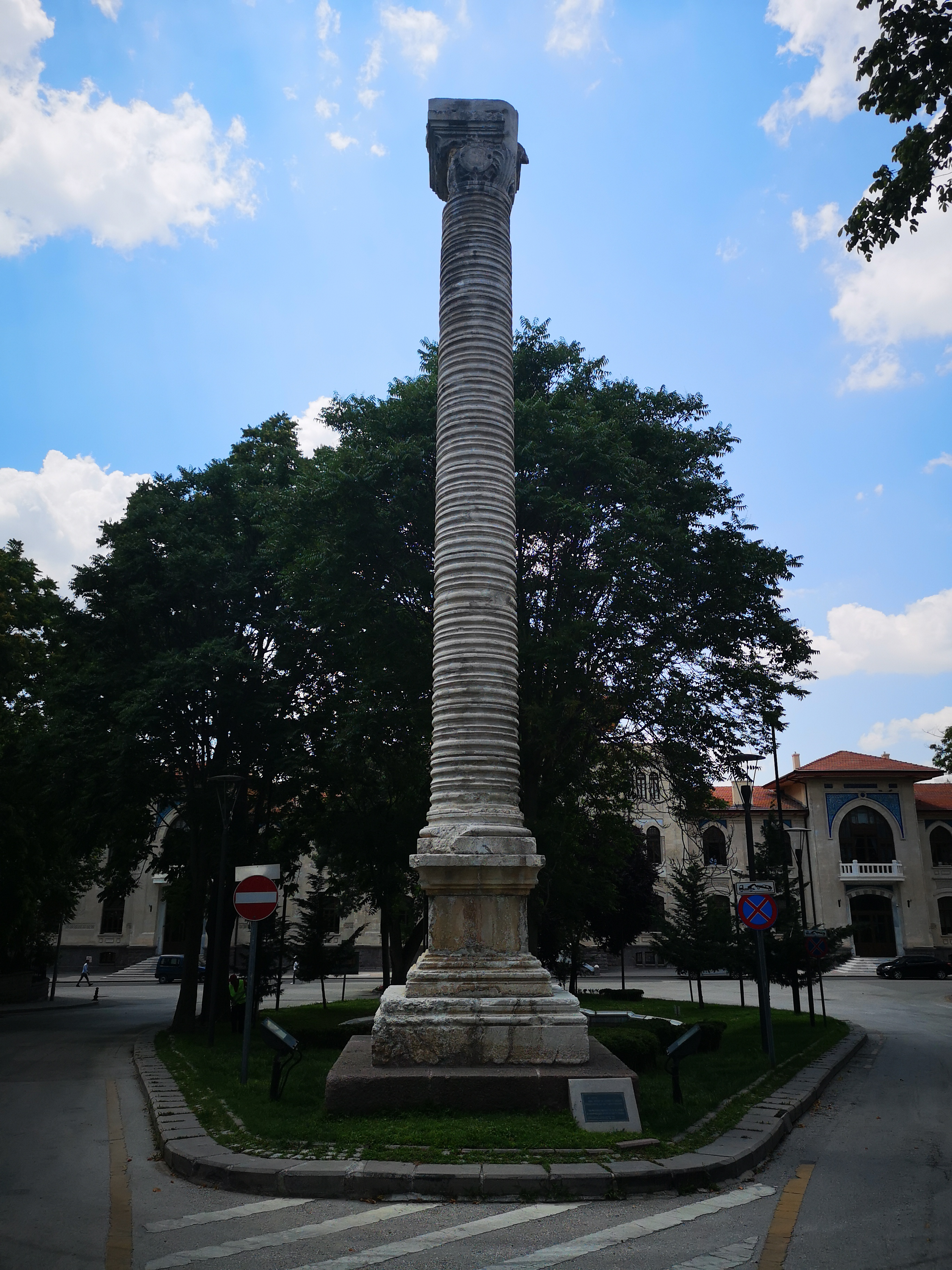

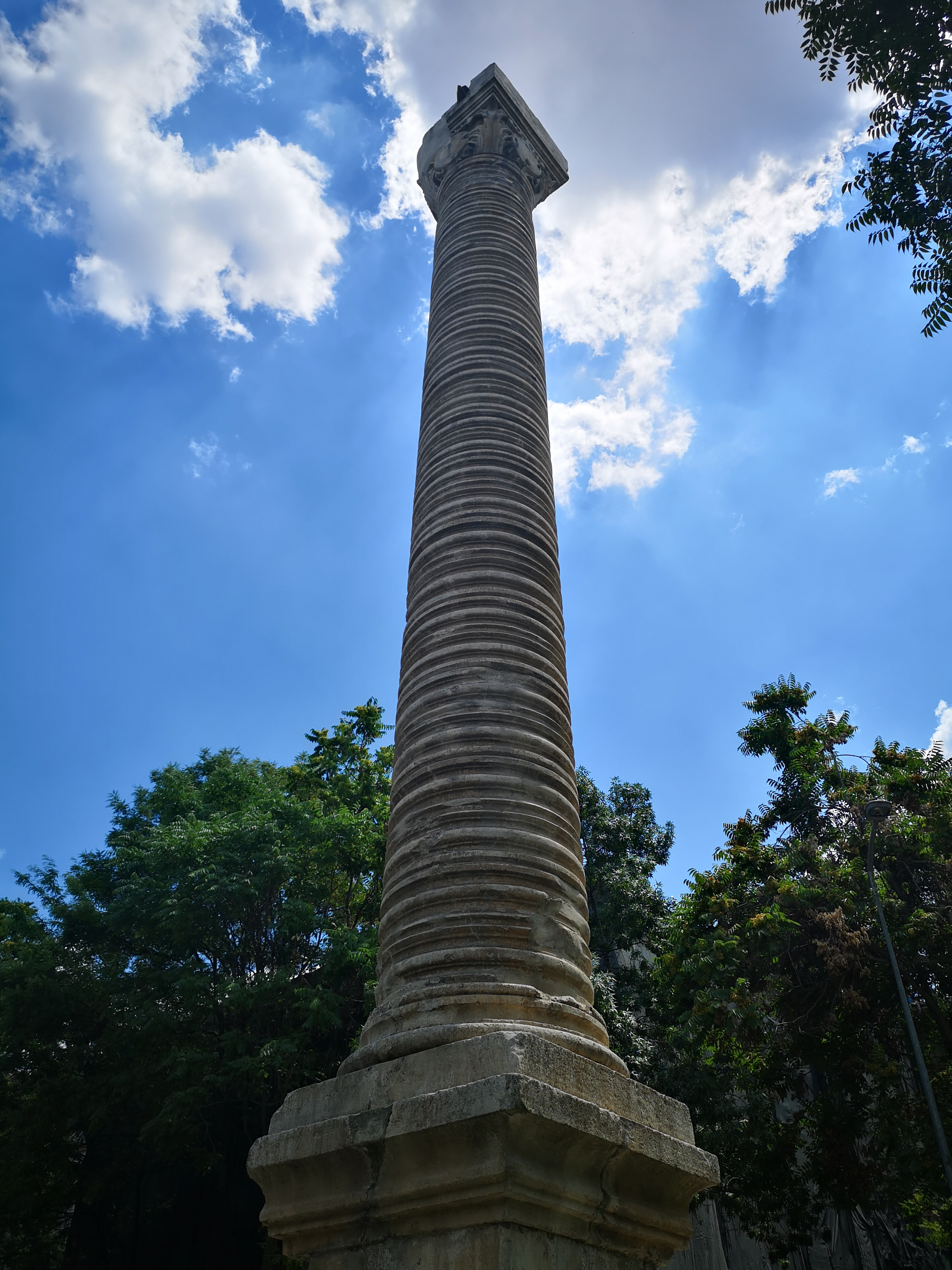
