= 2007 Ankara bombing =

Kurdish militant suicide bombing in Ankara, Turkey

Coordinates: 39°56′29.50″N 32°51′22.00″E

2007 Ankara suicide bombing
- Part of the Kurdish–Turkish conflict (1978–present)
- Location: Ankara, Turkey
- Date: 22 May 2007; 17:20 – ? (UTC+2)
- Target: Shopping centre
- Attack type: Suicide bombing
- Deaths: 9
- Injuries: 121
- Perpetrator: Kurdistan Freedom Hawks (TAK)

The 2007 Ankara bombing was a suicide attack that occurred in Ankara, the capital of Turkey, on 22 May 2007. Six people were reported killed, including one of Pakistani origin, and 121 people were wounded. A seventh person died from his injuries on 7 June and another on 17 June raising the death toll to eight. A ninth person died on 4 July from his injuries.

== The attack ==
The explosion occurred outside a shopping centre in the Ulus quarter of Ankara. The police reports suggested a "suicide bombing". A type A4 bomb has been reported as being the cause of the explosion and the "Terror and Organised Crime Unit" (Turkish: Terör ve Organize Suçlar) has taken over the investigation. The explosion shattered windows of the shopping centre and of nearby buildings creating havoc. The Ankara bombing came as more than 35 world leaders, including the U.S. President, were in Istanbul for a NATO summit that began on Monday, which left tensions high as numerous other incidents have occurred in the run-up to the meeting. It also heightened political tensions between the secular and non-secular parties of Turkey, as both fight for public support and leadership of the nation. The timing of the bombing raised assassination suspicions since General Yaşar Büyükanıt (Chief of the General Staff), General İlker Başbuğ (Commander of the Army), General Işık Koşaner (Commander of the Gendarmerie), General Faruk Cömert (Commander of the Air Force), and Admiral Yener Karahanoğlu (Commander of the Navy) were to attend the IDEF Defense Fair same day held at the Anatolian Civilizations Museum (Turkish: Anadolu Medeniyetleri Müzesi) crossing the blast zone.

The suicide bomber was later identified as Güven Akkuş. Circumstances regarding the explosion of Akkuş's explosives remains unclear. The police has three competing theories:

1. While moving towards the target suicide bomber Akkuş panicked when a squad car coincidentally stopped in front of him, leading him to detonate his explosive.
2. Type A-4 explosives are sensitive to body temperature so it is possible that the explosives self-detonated while Akkuş and a collaborator only identified by her code name "Ayşe" panicked after the encounter with the squad car.
3. Collaborator "Ayşe" detonated Akkuş's explosives remotely when Akkuş panicked.

Collaborator "Ayşe" is known to have visited a hospital briefly after the bombing and is currently at large.

The attack was claimed by the Kurdistan Freedom Hawks (TAK). Turkish government claims TAK is part of the Kurdistan Workers' Party (PKK) but PKK denies this.

== See also ==
- 2015 Ankara bombings
