= 1916 Great Ankara Fire =

Deadly fire in Ankara, Turkey

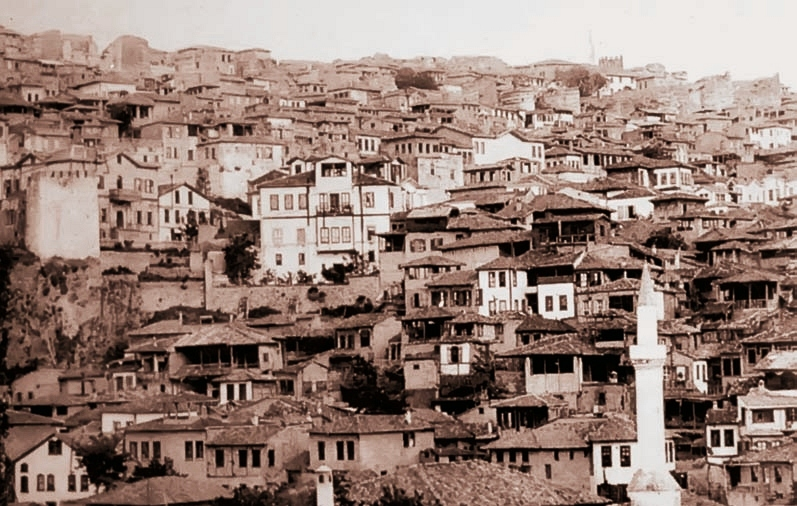
- Bentderesi, Ulus, Angora (Ankara), 1917
- Date: September 13–15, 1916
- Location: Altındağ, Angora, Angora vilayet, Turkey
- Deaths: 5
- Property damage: 1000 homes 935 shops 7 churches 2 mosques 3 healthcare facilities

The 1916 Great Ankara Fire caused extensive damage to the Turkish city of Ankara on September 15, 1916. The areas affected included the Hisarönü, Çıkrıkçılar Yokuşu, Bedesten, Saraçlar Bazaar and Atpazarı. It is estimated that up to 1,900 people lost their lives in the fire. The 1916 fire was part of successive fires which occurred in 20 provinces of Turkey in the span of three years. After the fire, only two mosques and seven churches remained in Ankara.
