= Antique Rome theatre of Ankara =

Roman open-air theatre in Ankara, Turkey

- Ankara Roma Tiyatrosu
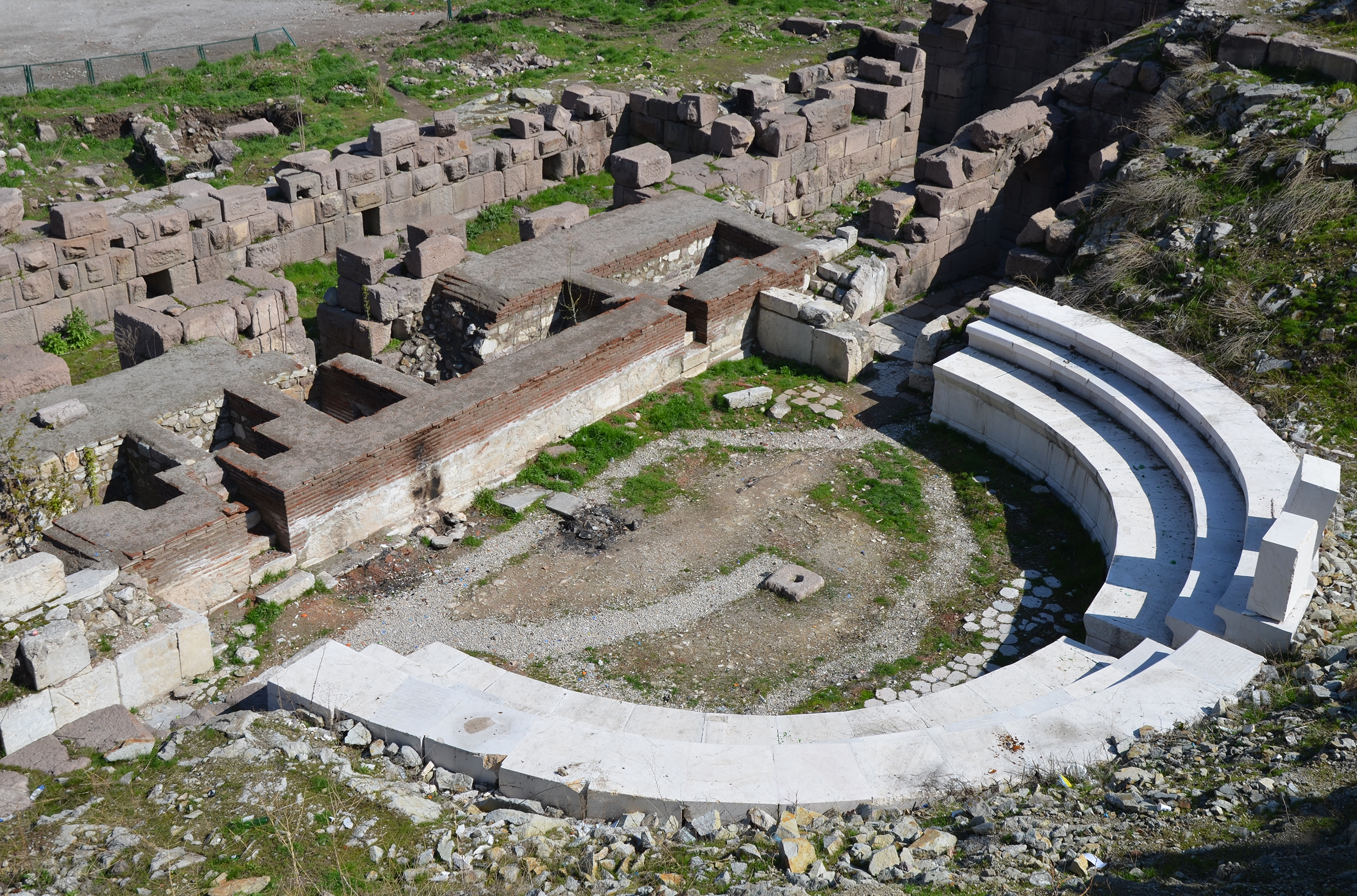
- Location: Altındağ, Ankara, Turkey
- Coordinates: 39°56′31.4″N 32°51′36.8″E
- Type: Open-air museum
- Public transit access: Ulus (Ankara Metro)
- Parking: No

Ankara Roman Theater is the Ancient Roman Theater located between Hisar Street and Pınar Street in Ulus district of Altındağ district in Ankara, the capital city of Turkey. Although the exact date of construction is not known, it is dated to the 2nd century AD.

== Intro ==
Based on the excavations carried out under the leadership of the Museum of Anatolian Civilizations between 1982 and 1986, the building was registered as the 1st and 2nd nature protected areas on February 25, 1992. During the excavations, vaulted parados buildings, upholstered orchestra, audience seats (caves), stage sections were found, as well as magnificent foundations and walls, and parts.

== Restoration debates ==
After the last excavations carried out between 2009 and 2010, the ancient theater was transferred to the Ankara Metropolitan Municipality and the restoration of the building came to the fore. Within the scope of the project created, three-dimensional modeling of the theater was made in accordance with the original and it was decided to completely renew the cave part. However, although Ankara stone was used during its construction, the fact that the seating part was completely covered with white marble during the restoration was met with criticism by many experts.
