= Ulus, Ankara =

Central quarter of Ankara, Turkey

Coordinates: 39°56′30.85″N 32°51′15.60″E

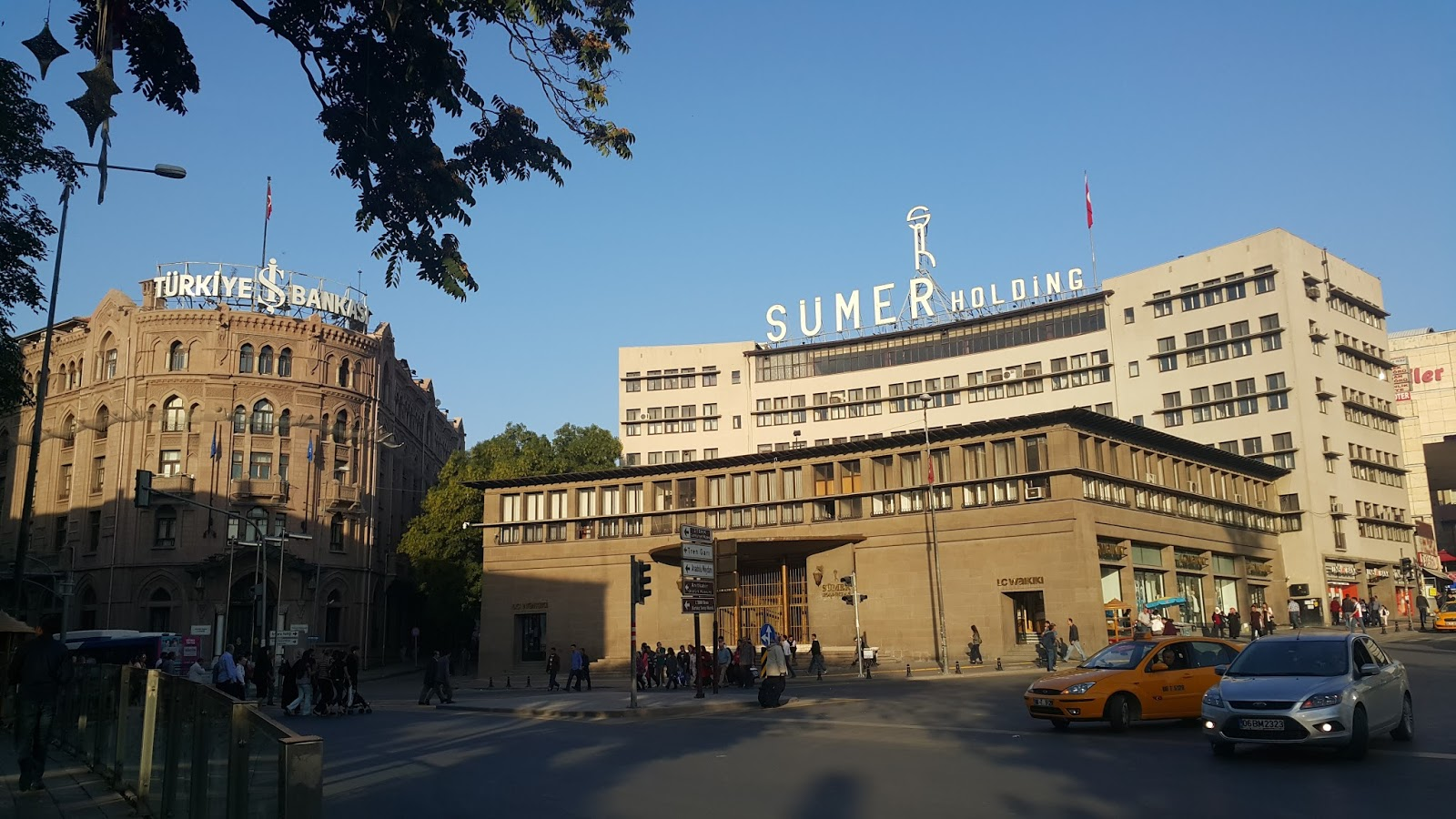
Ulus Square, the surrounding area

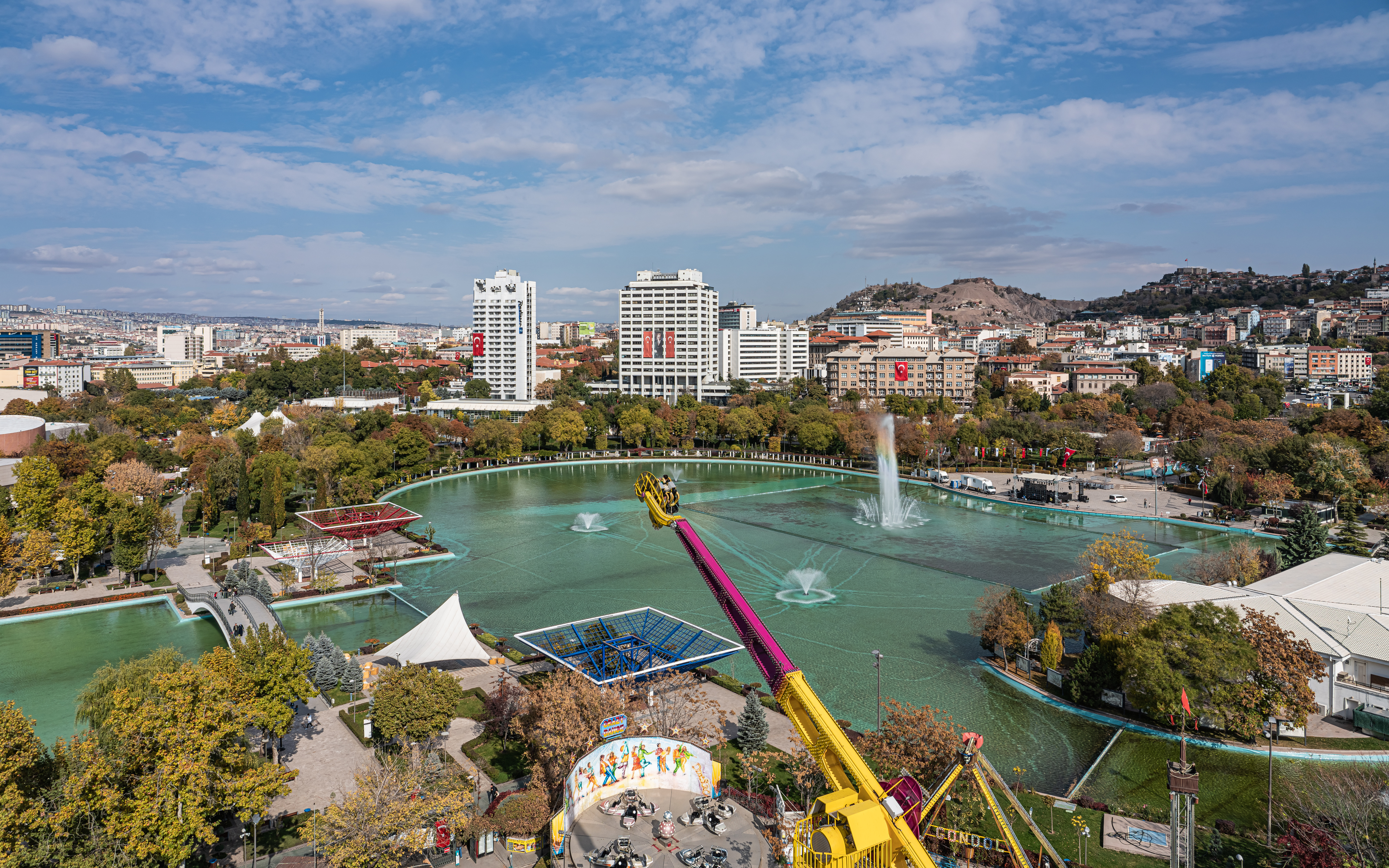
View towards Ulus from the Ferris wheel of the Gençlik Parkı

Ulus is a quarter in Ankara, Turkey and is located at the center of the capital city. It was once the heart of old Ankara. The name means "tribe, nation" in Turkish.

It is now a predominantly a commercial and tourist area made up of banks, malls, shops, hotels, businesses, restaurants, and many historical sites. The first Turkish Grand National Assembly convened here in 1923 in the parliament building at Ulus Square (Turkish: Ulus Meydanı), which still stands in original. Across from the historical parliament building is the city's oldest hotel, the Ankara Palas, where Atatürk had stayed. Ankara Citadel, another historical attraction, is located immediate east of Ulus.

In the center of Ulus Square, there is a memorial called Monument of Republic, which was erected in 1927 as a symbol of the Turkish War of Independence.

The Statue of Victory at Ulus Square was depicted on the reverse of the Turkish 2 1/2 lira banknote of 1939-1952 and of the 50 lira banknotes of 1951–1979.

A shopping mall situated next to Ulus square was subject to a terrorist bombing on 22 May 2007.

== Places of interest ==
- Ankara Castle
- Ankara Ethnography Museum
- Ankara Palas
- Antique Rome theatre of Ankara
- Aslanhane Mosque
- Çengelhan Rahmi M. Koç Museum
- Column of Julianus (362 AD)
- Erimtan Archaeology and Arts Museum
- Gençlik Parkı
- Hacı Bayram Mosque
- Temple of Augustus
- Republic Museum
- Roman Bath (3rd century AD)
- Roman Road of Ankara
- State Art and Sculpture Museum
- St. Teresa's Catholic Church, Ankara
- Suluhan
- Ulucanlar Prison Museum
- War of Independence Museum (Kurtuluş Savaşı Müzesi) - originally the first parliament building

== Some historical buildings ==
Ankara - Ulus

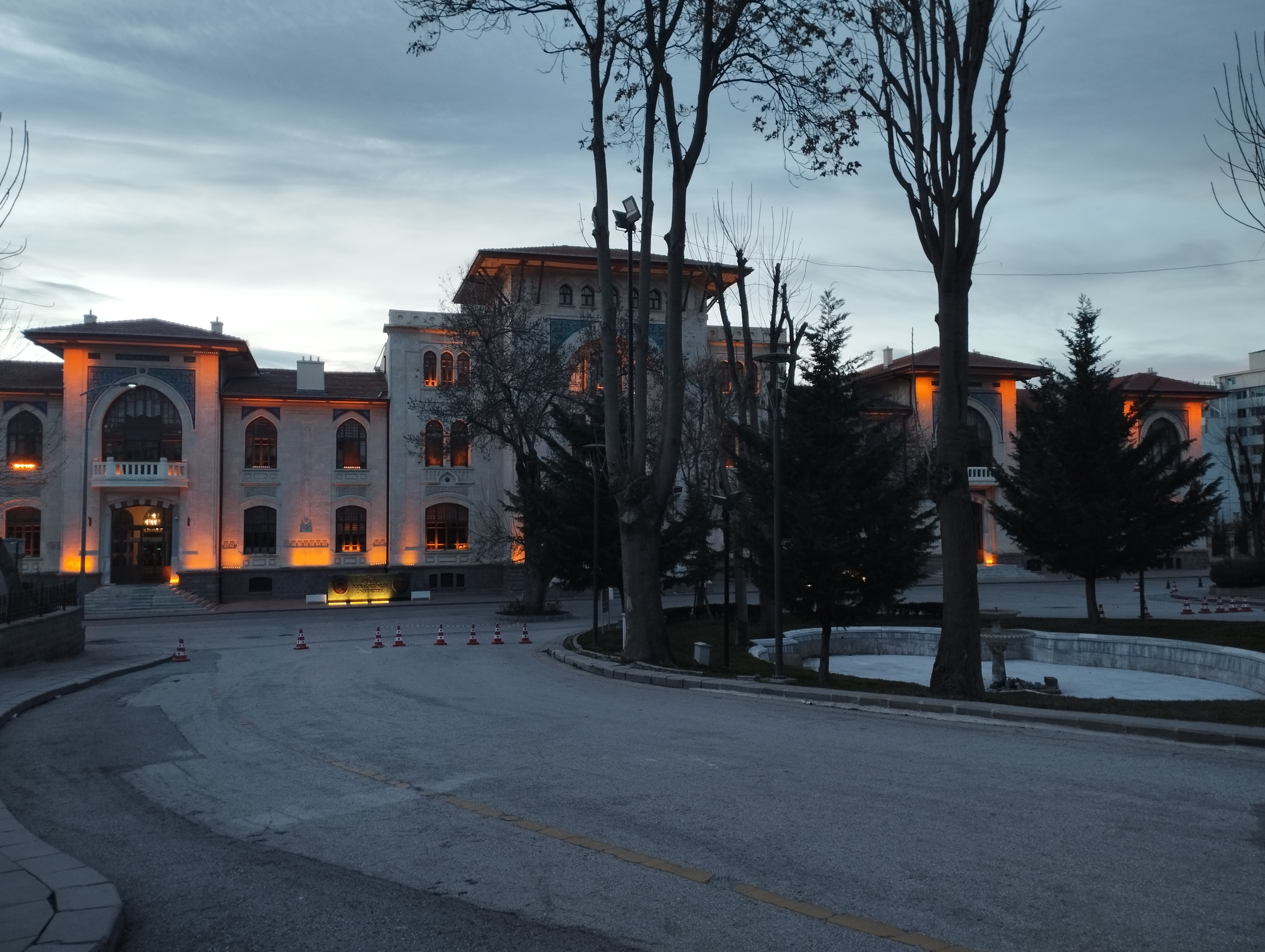
Ulus - Former governorship building

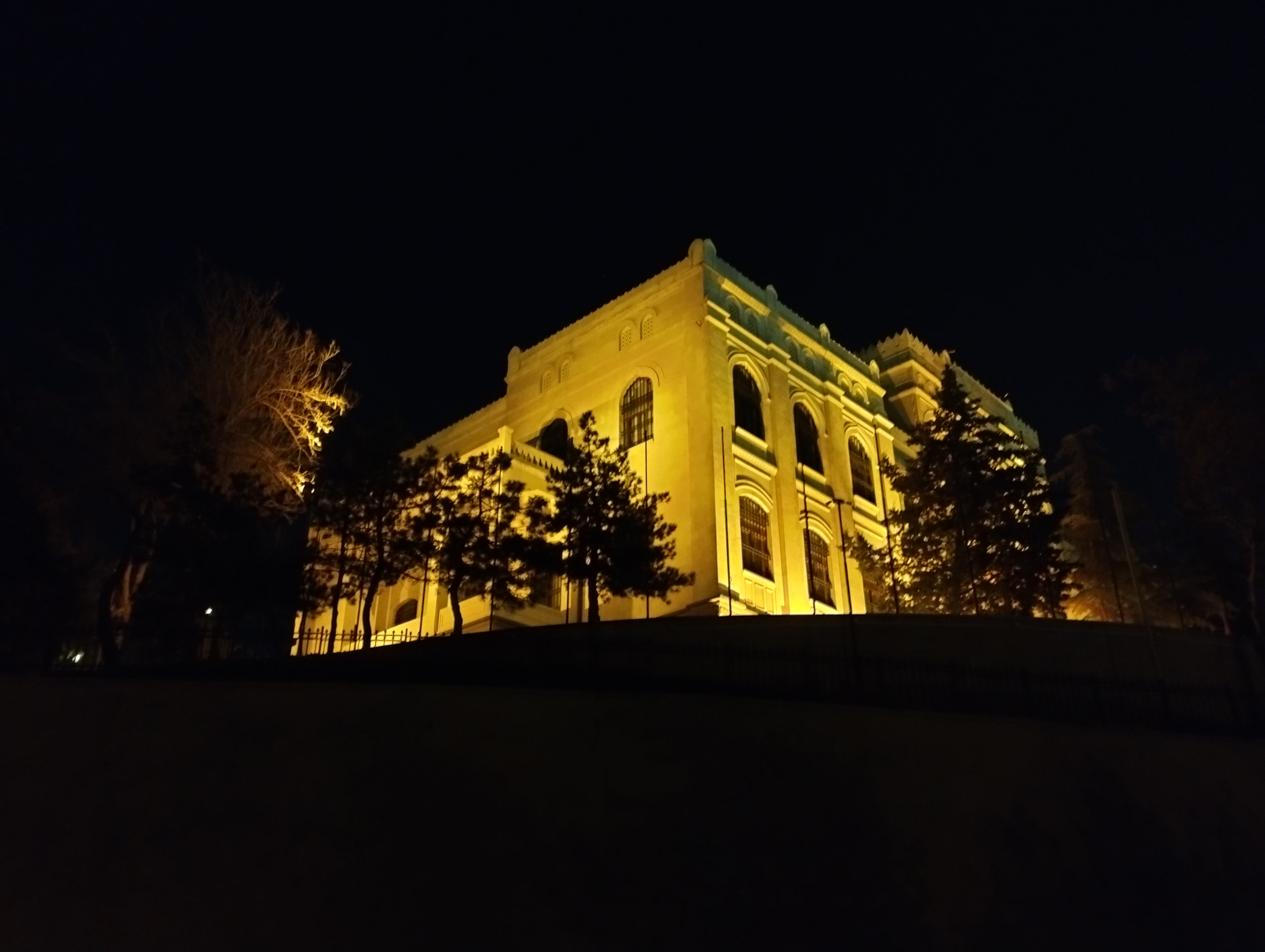
Ankara Painting and Sculpture Museum

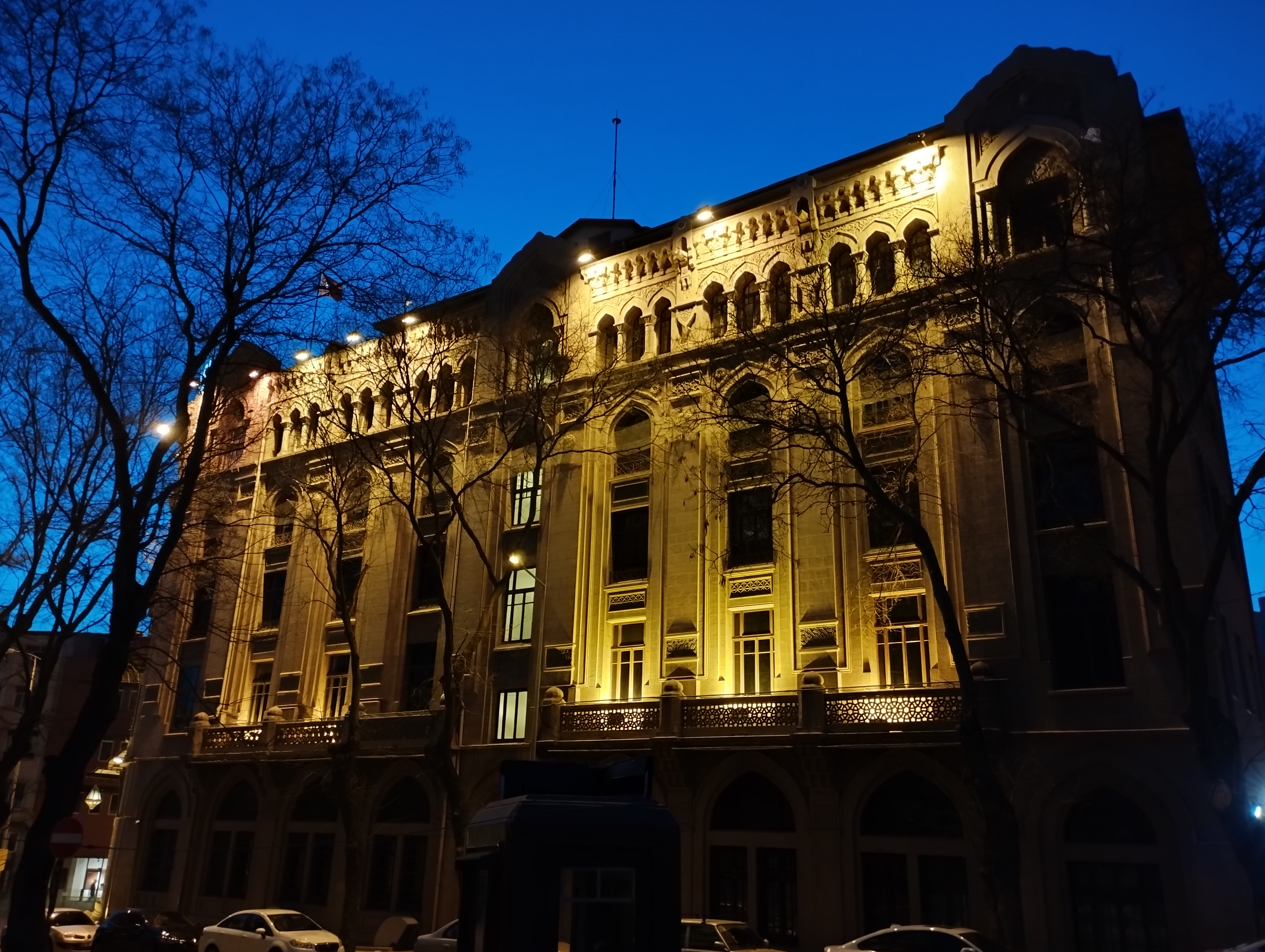
Ulus - Former iş bankası building

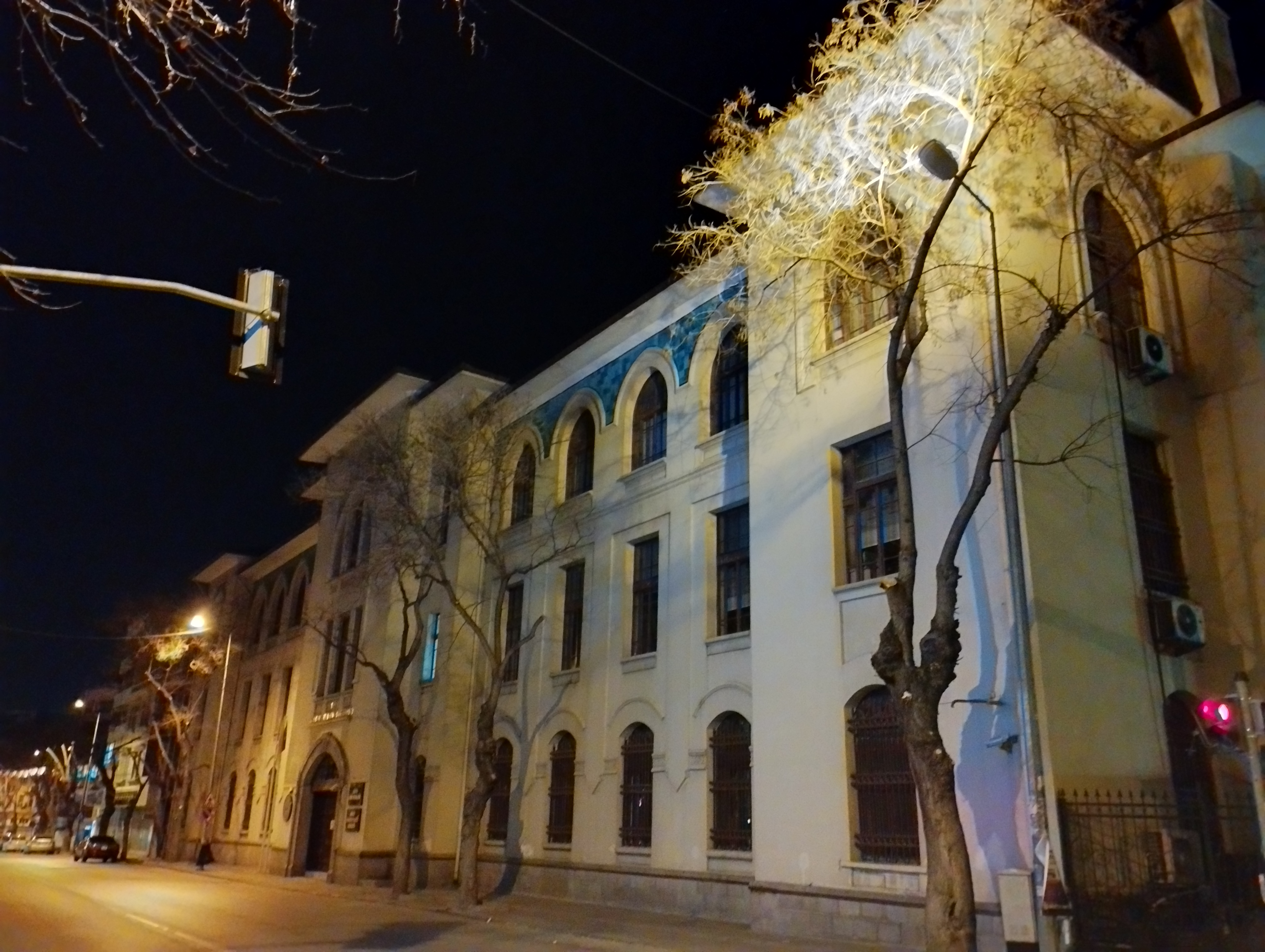
Ulus - Ministry of Tourism - Anafartalar avenue

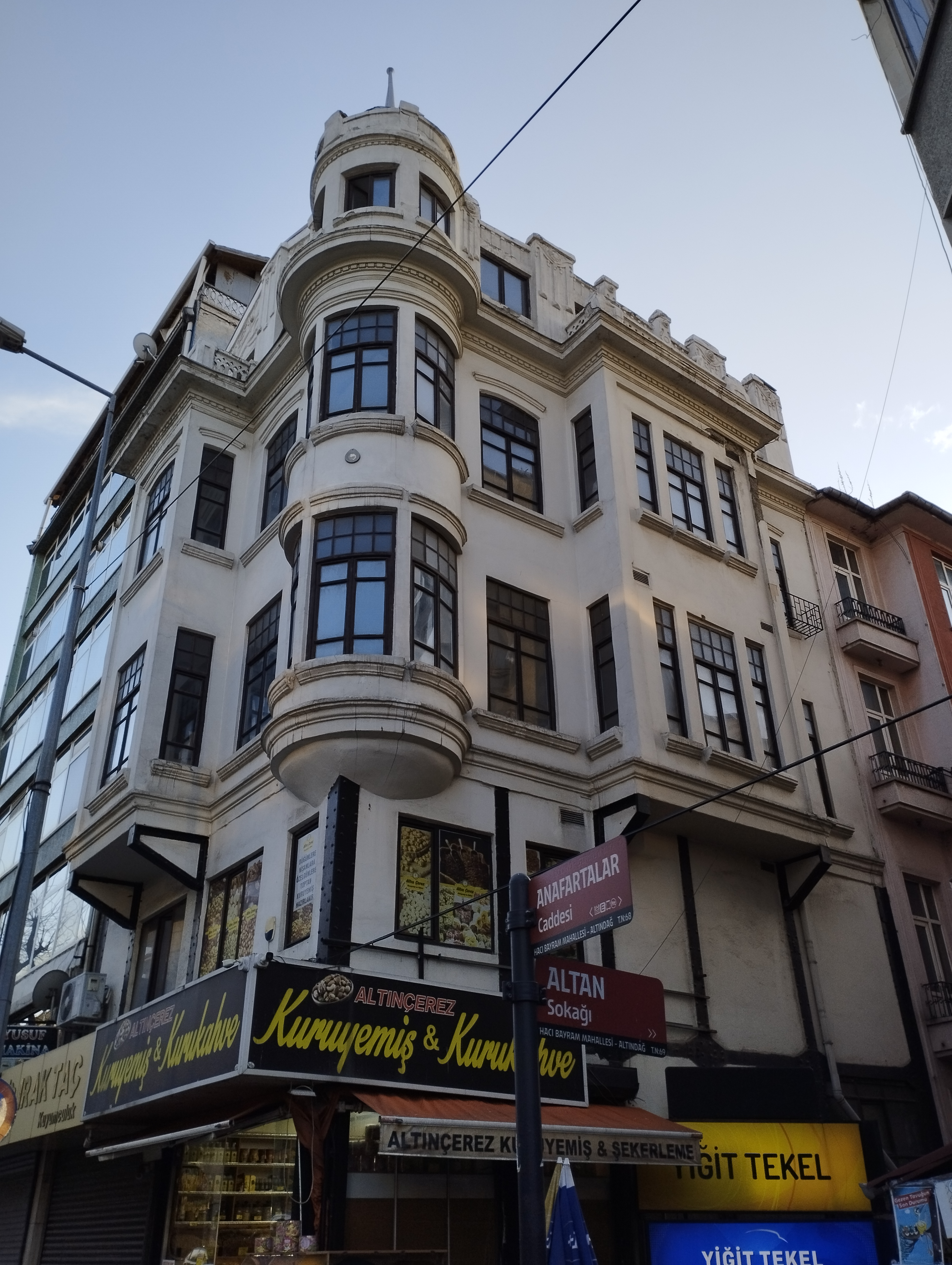
Ulus - Anafartalar avenue 1

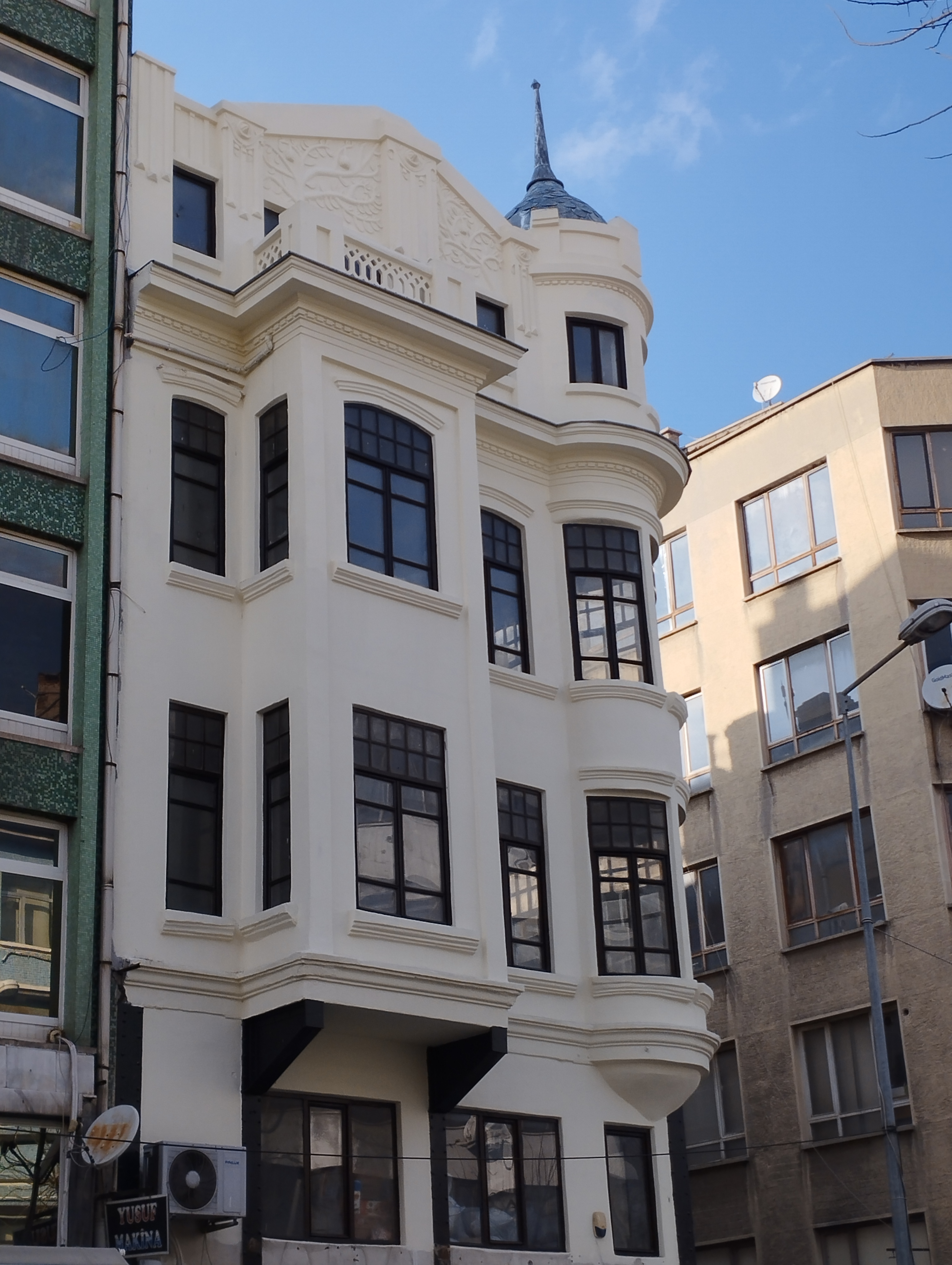
Ulus - Anafartalar avenue 2

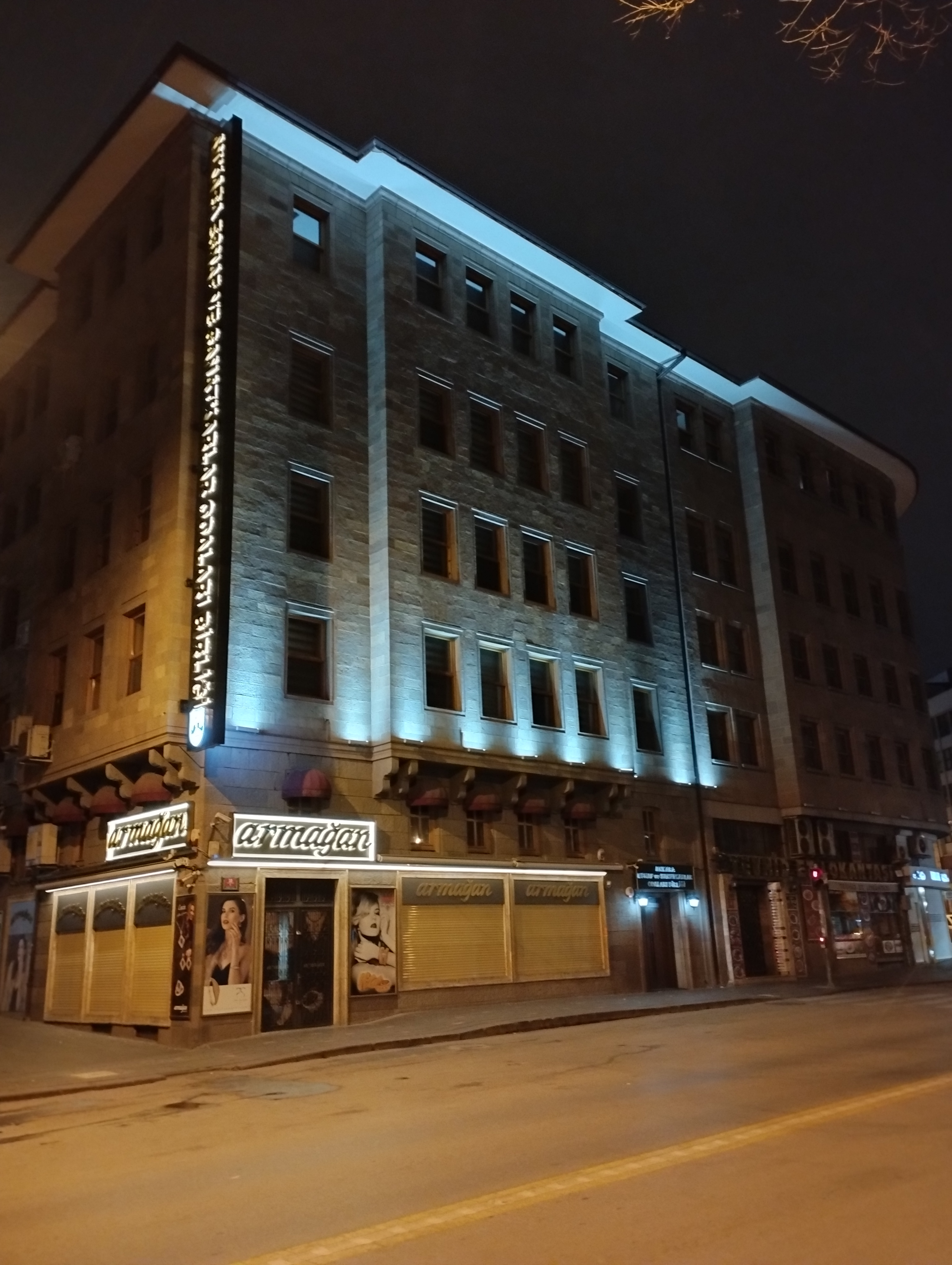
Ulus - Anafartalar avenue 3

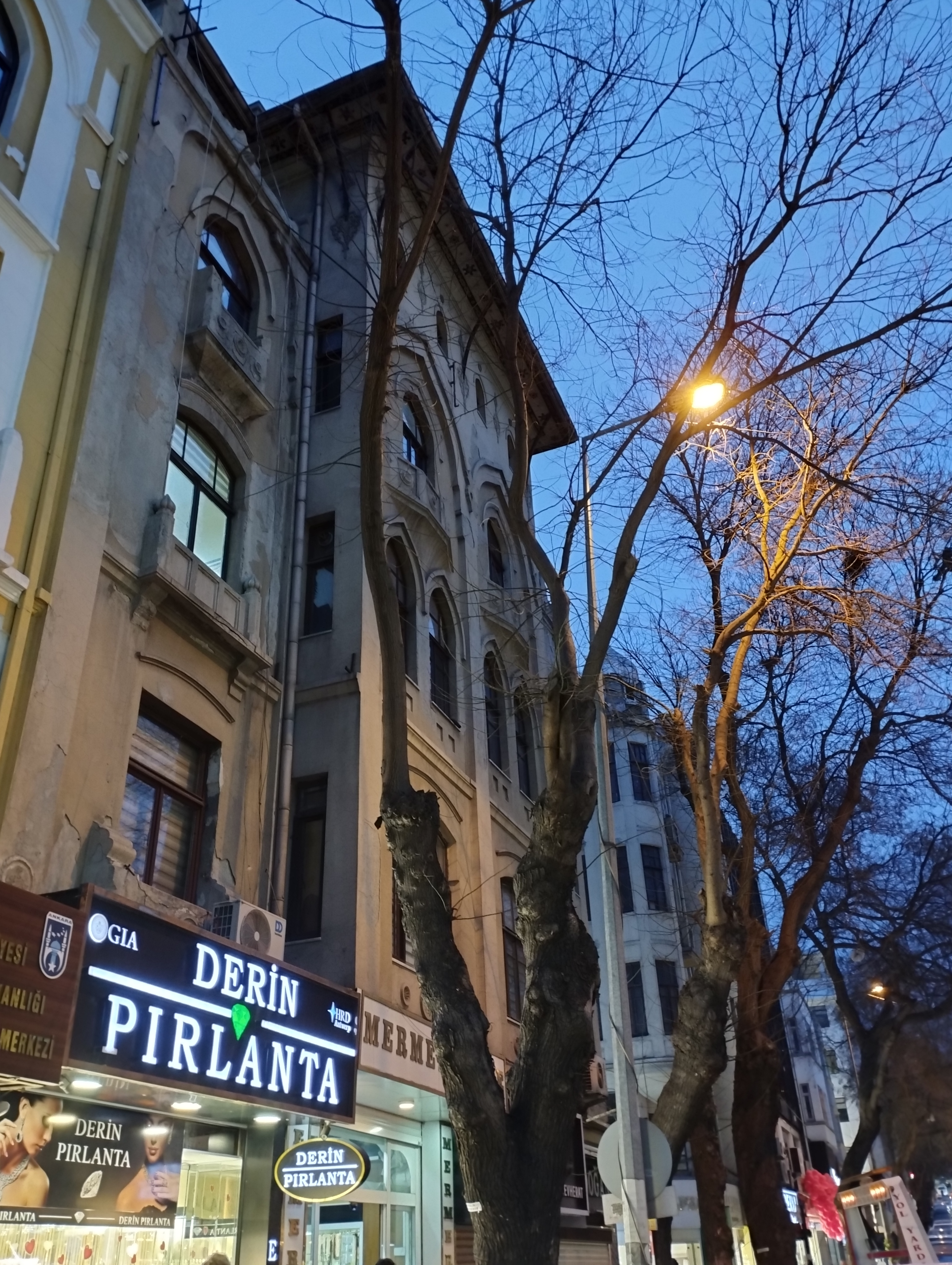
Ulus - Anafartalar avenue 4

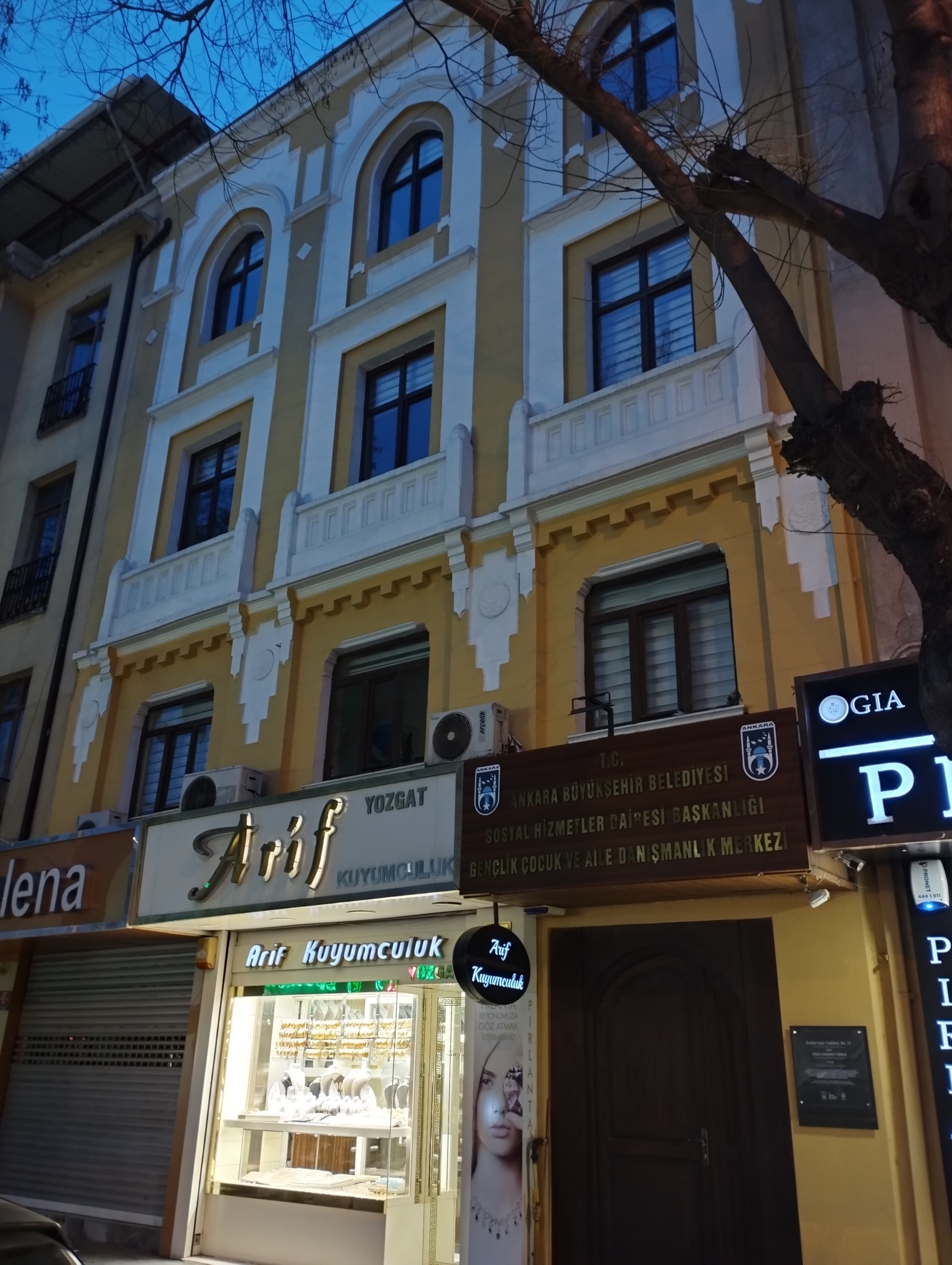
Ulus - Anafartalar avenue 5

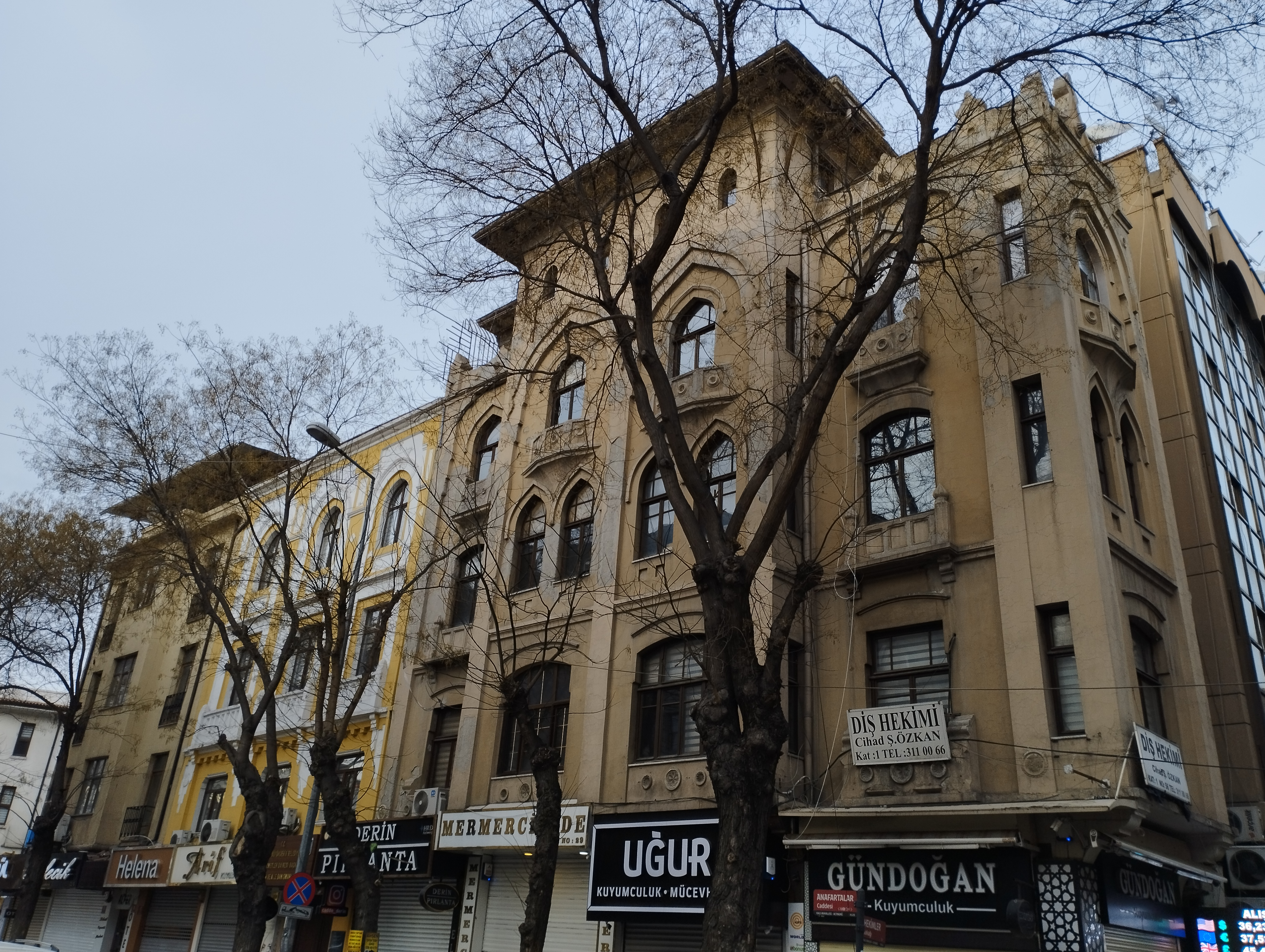
Anafartalar caddesi 1 - Ulus - Ankara

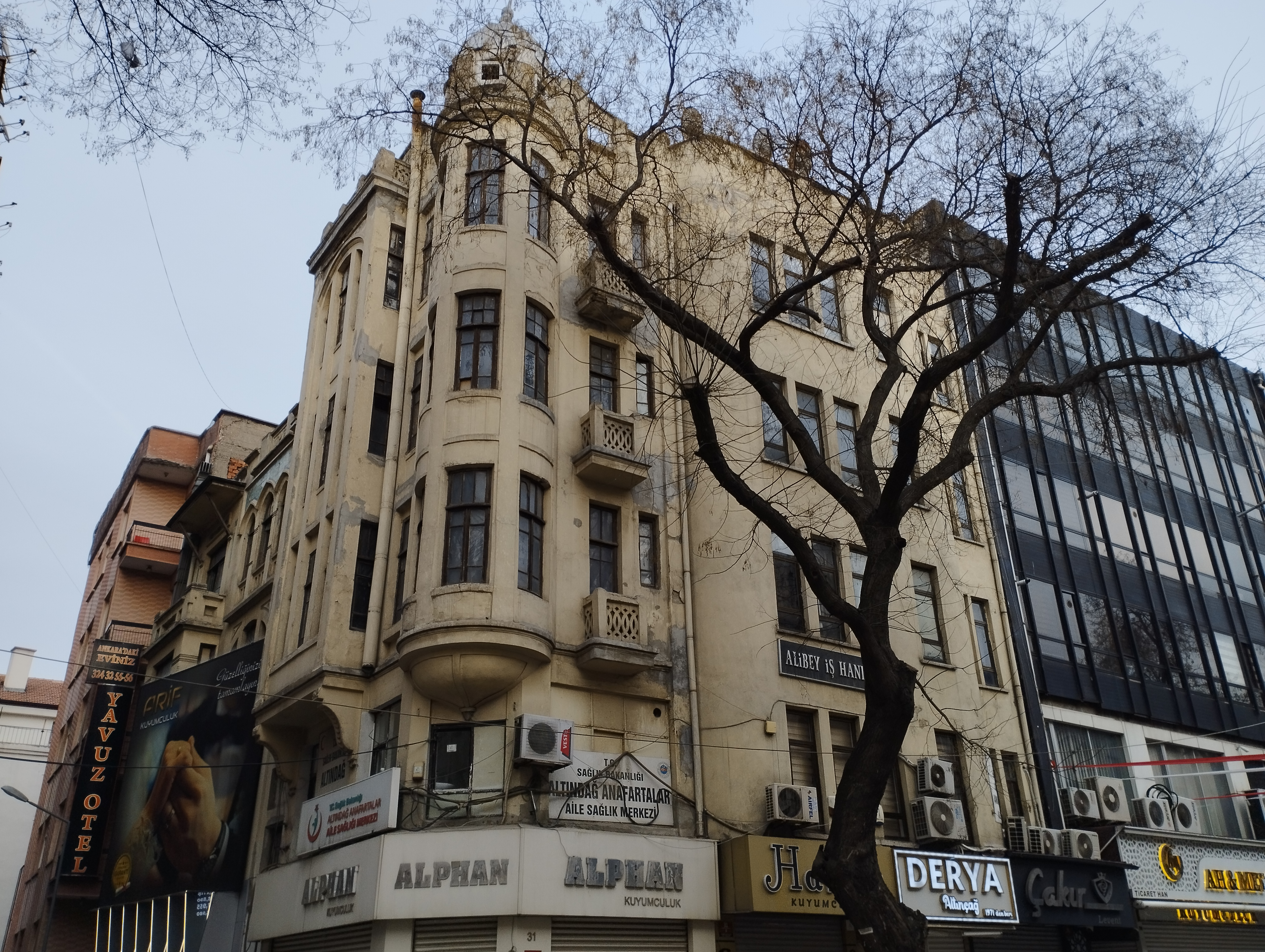
Anafartalar caddesi 2 - Ulus - Ankara

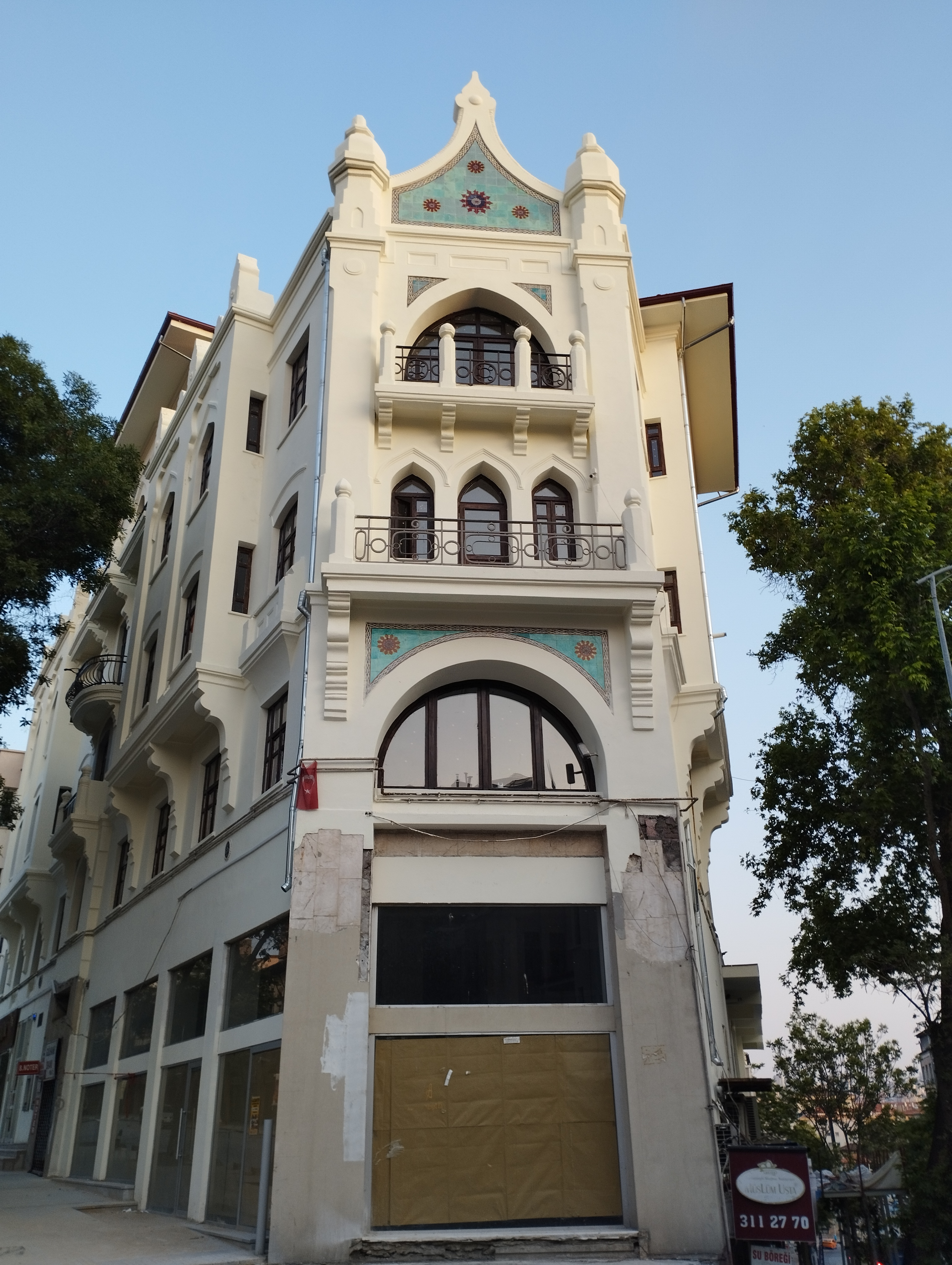
Ulus Anafartalar avenue

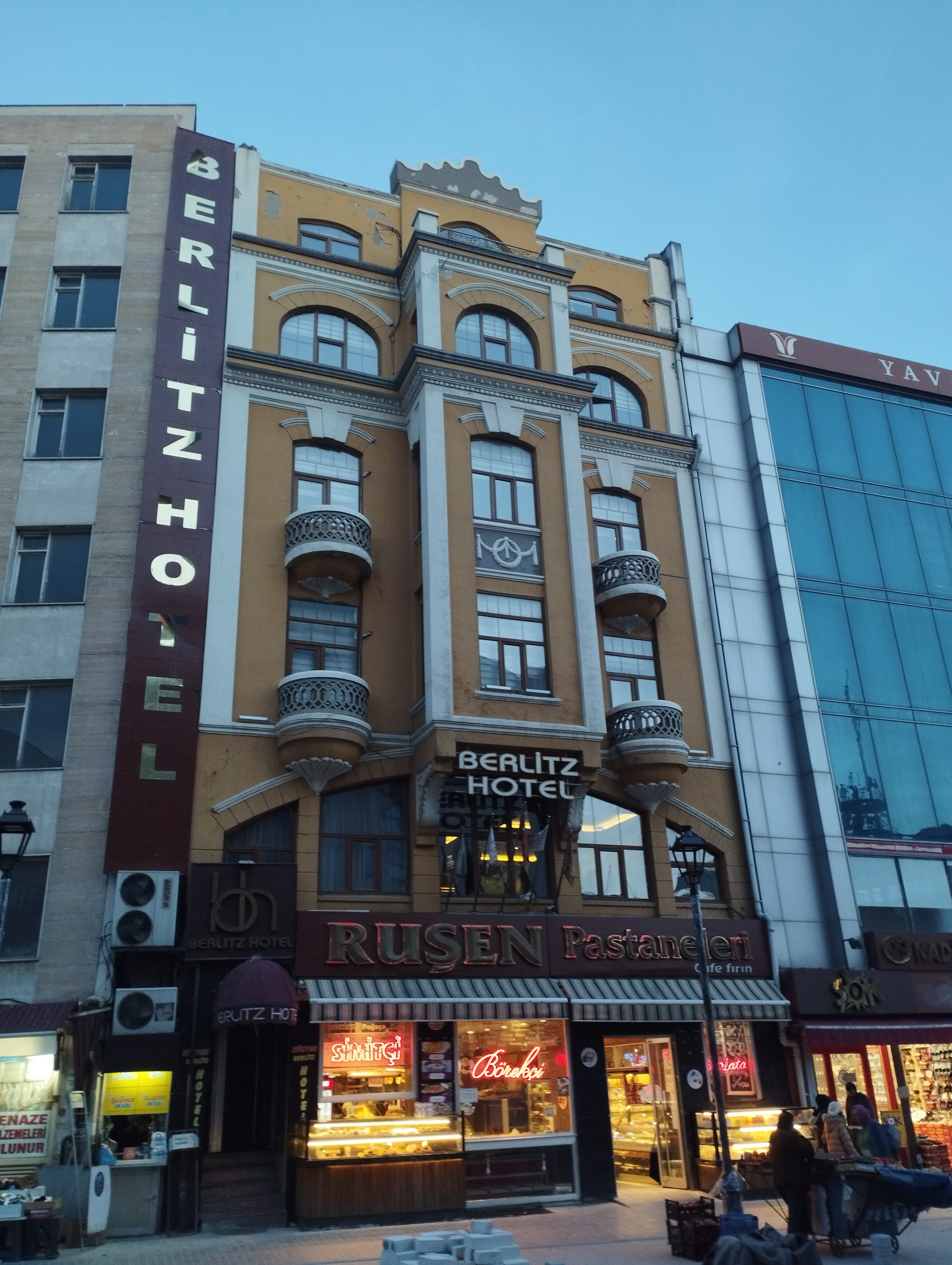
Ulus - Hükümet street

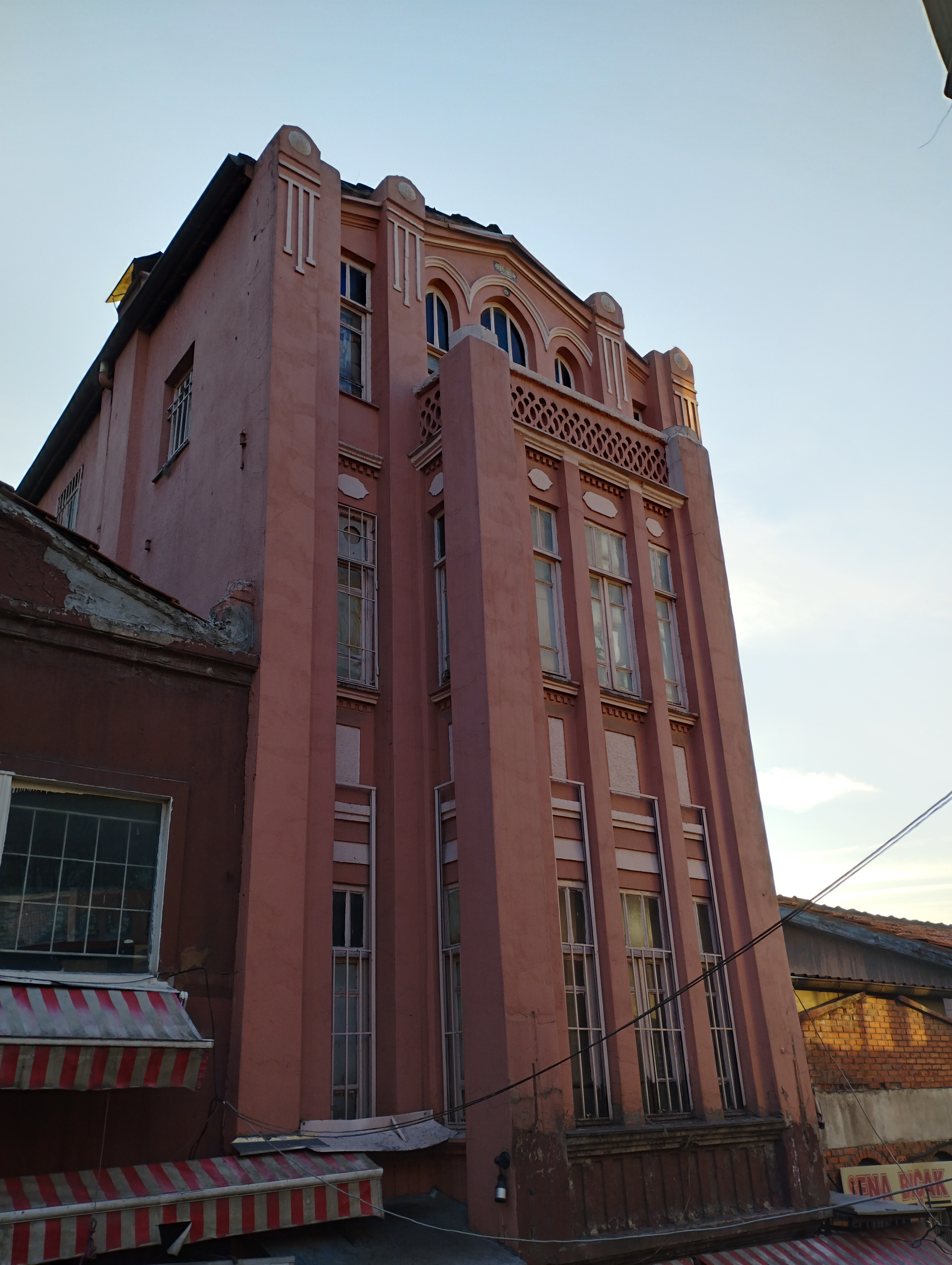
Ulus - Alsancak street

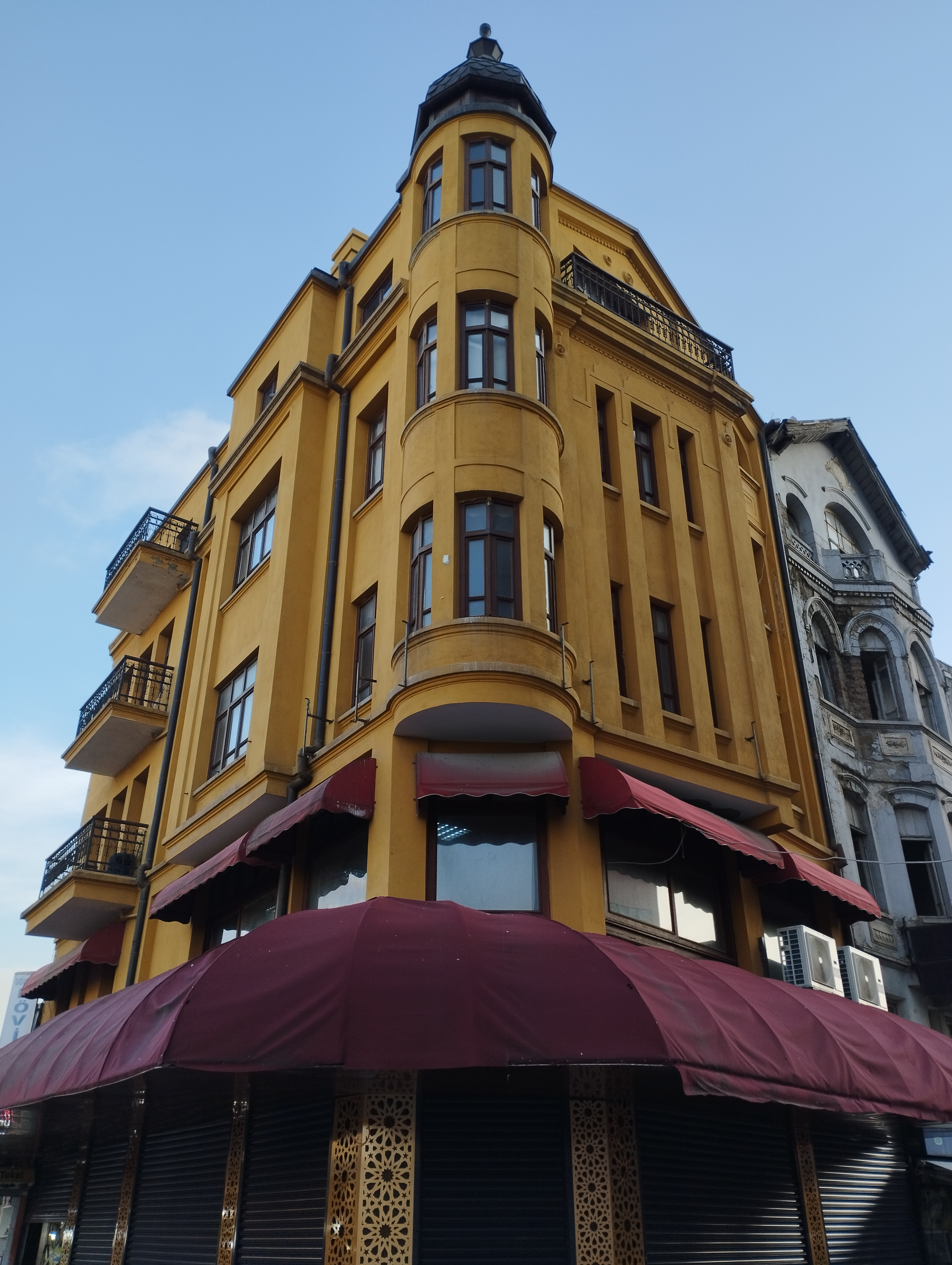
Ulus - Susam street

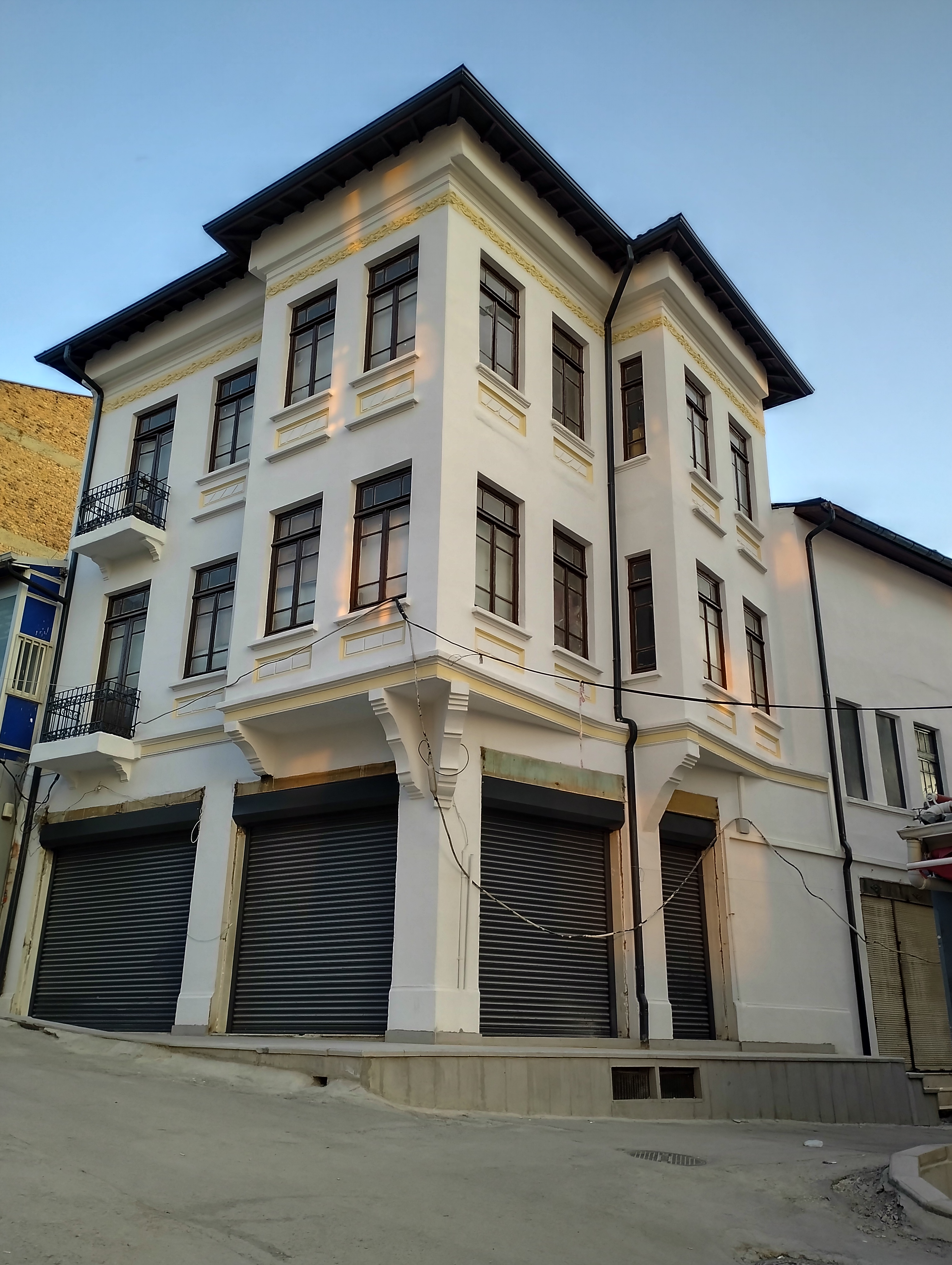
Çıkrıkçılar Yokuşu 1

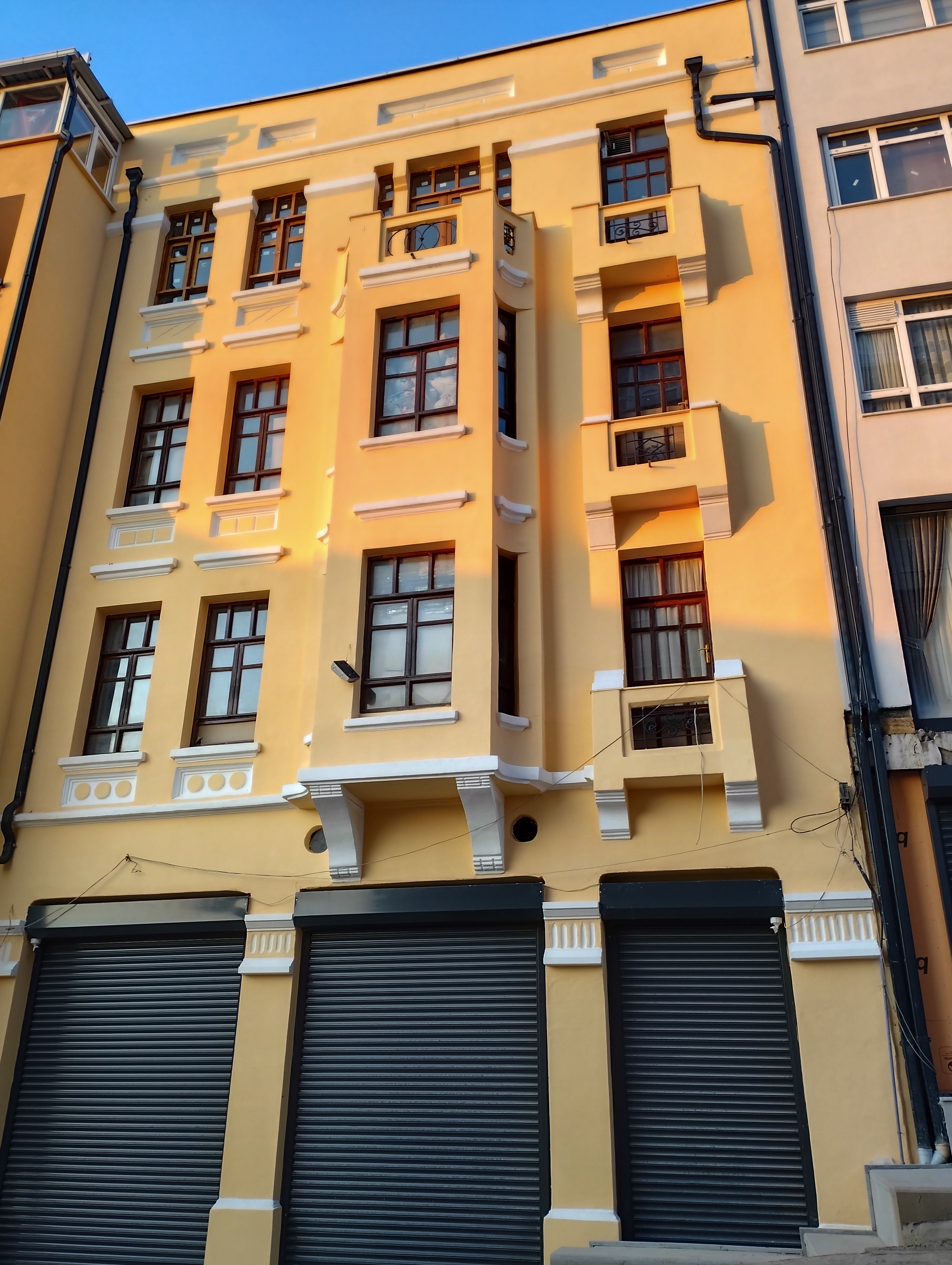
Çıkrıkçılar Yokuşu 3

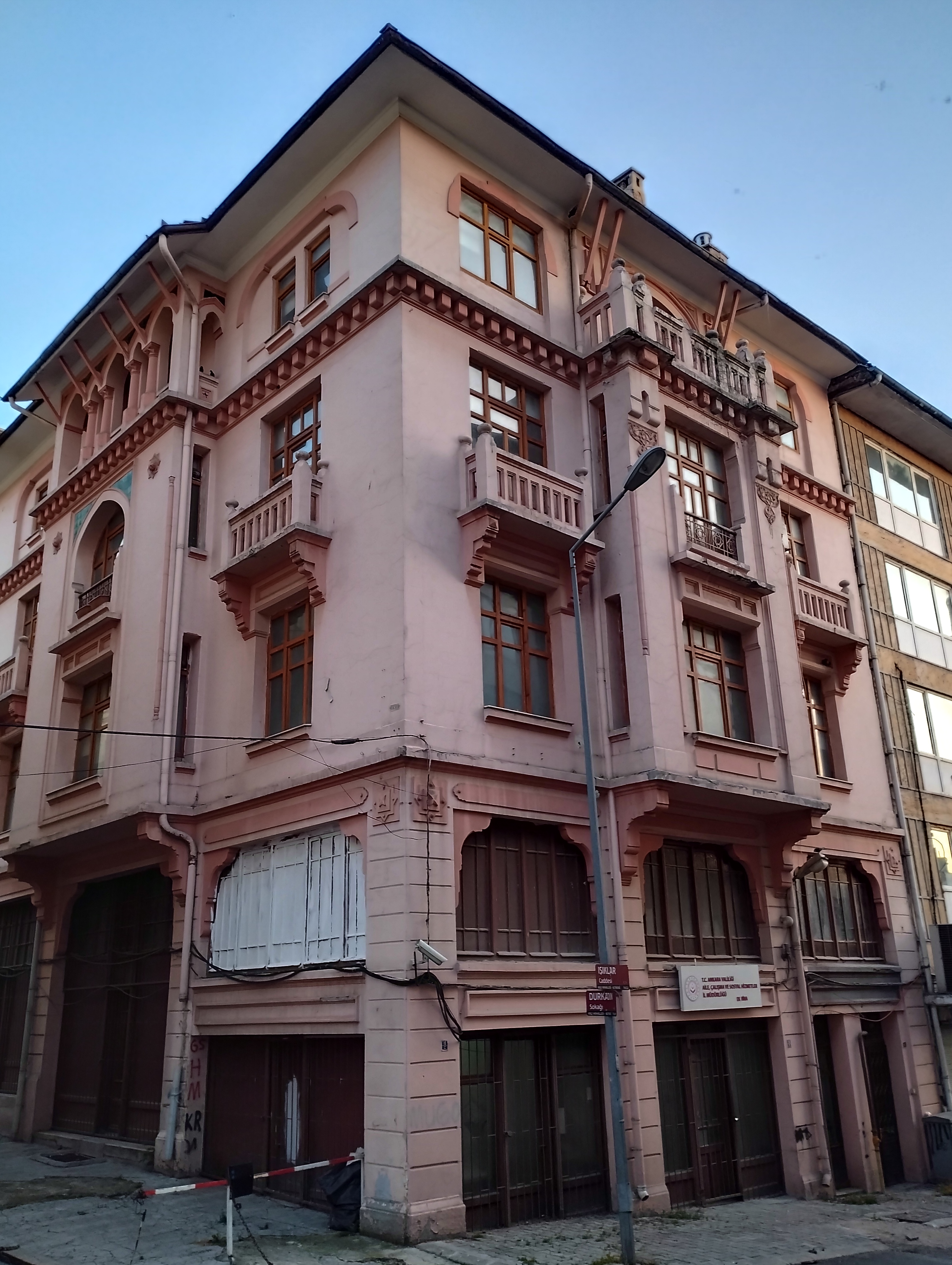
Ulus - Işıklar Avenue

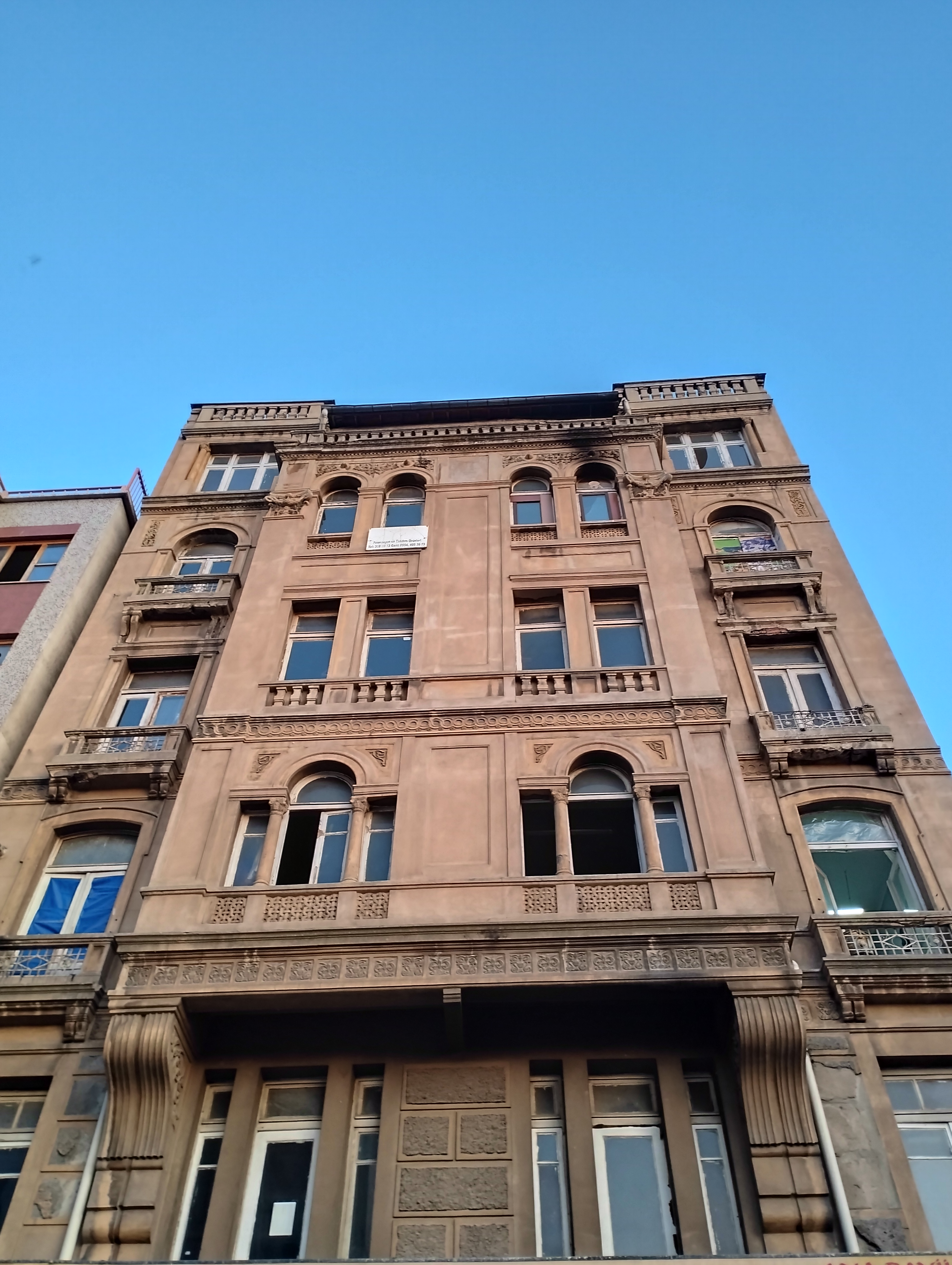
Ulus - Işıklar Avenue

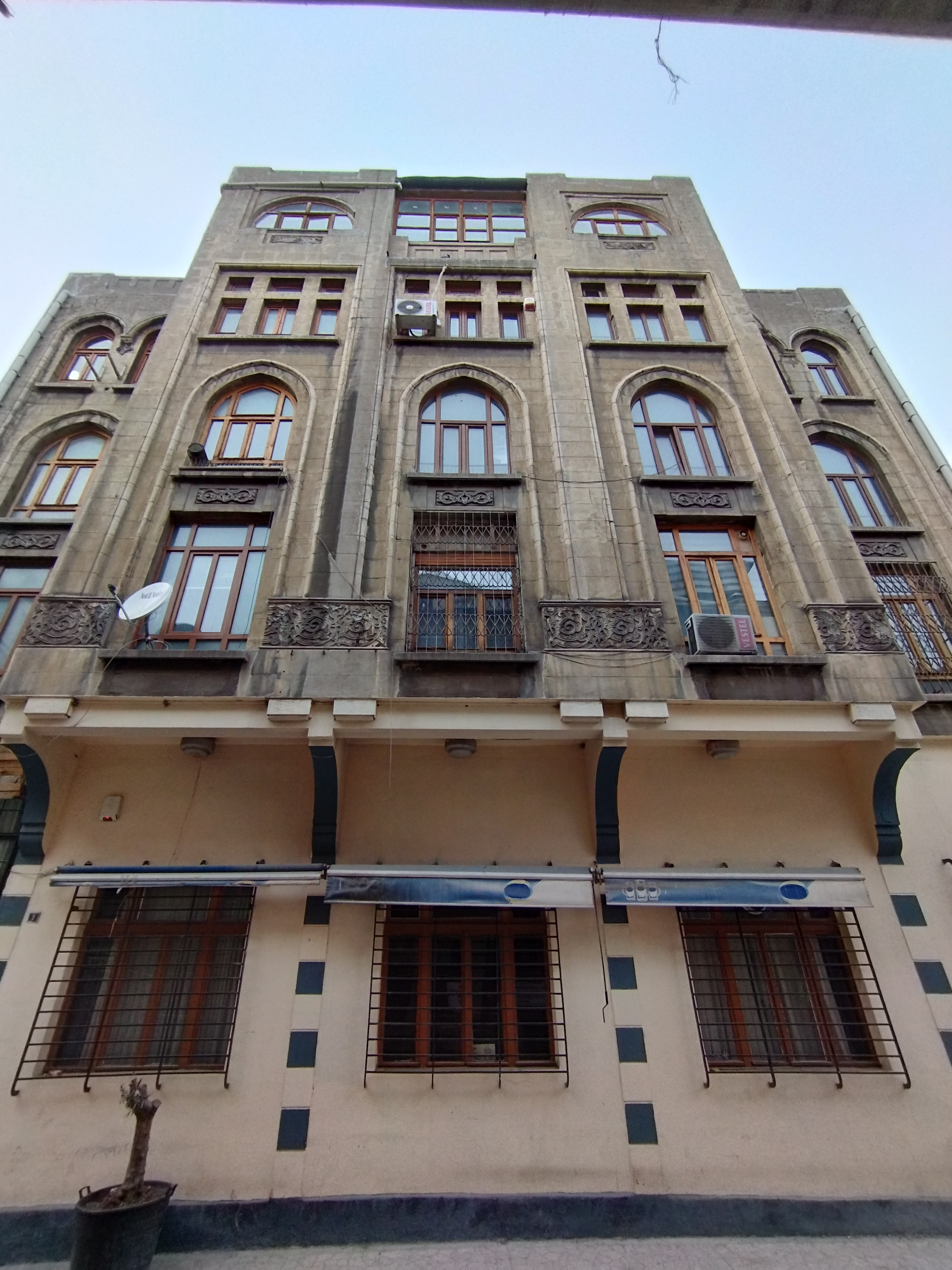
Konya sokak 1 - Ulus - Ankara

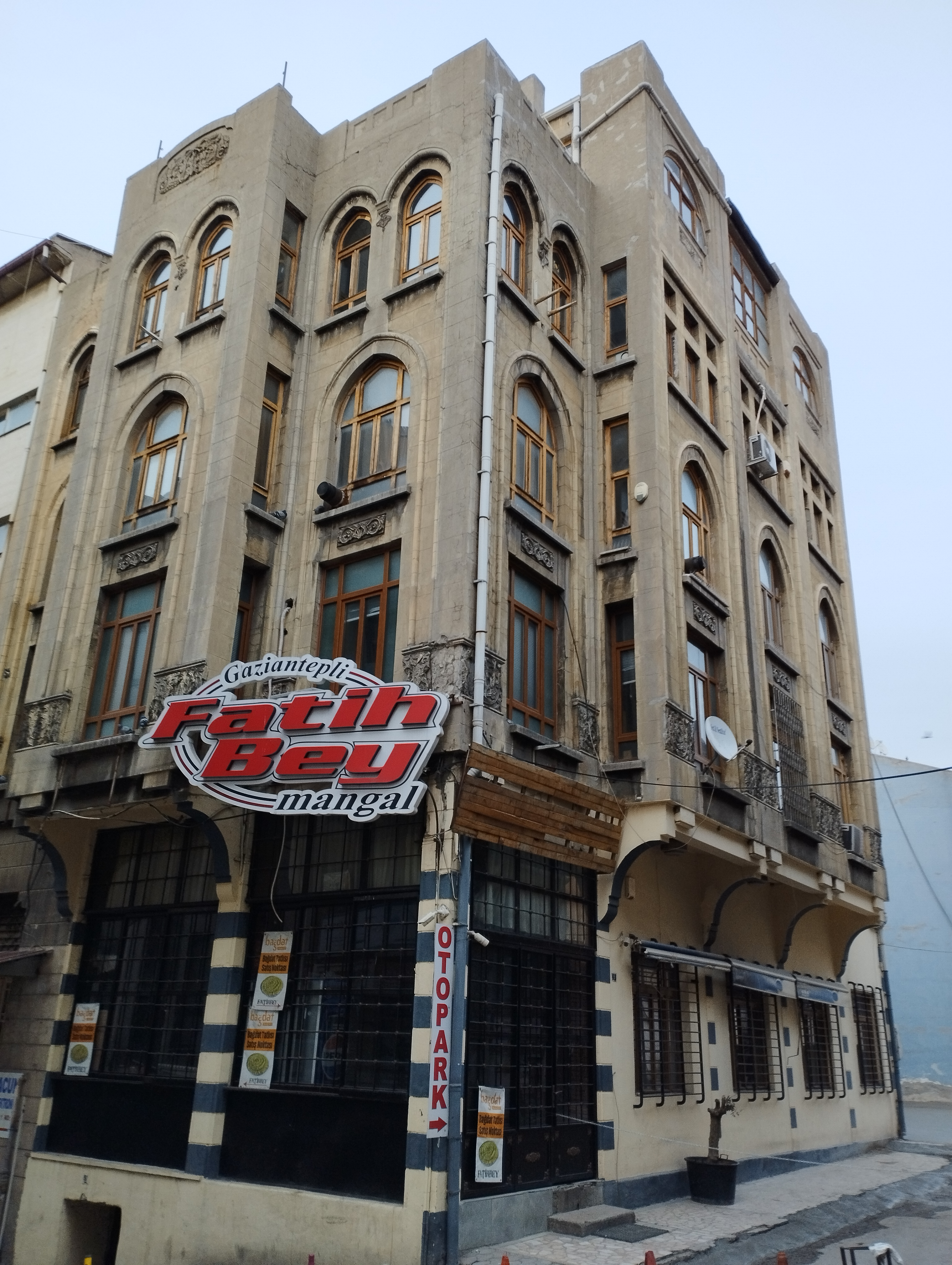
Konya sokak 2 - Ulus - Ankara

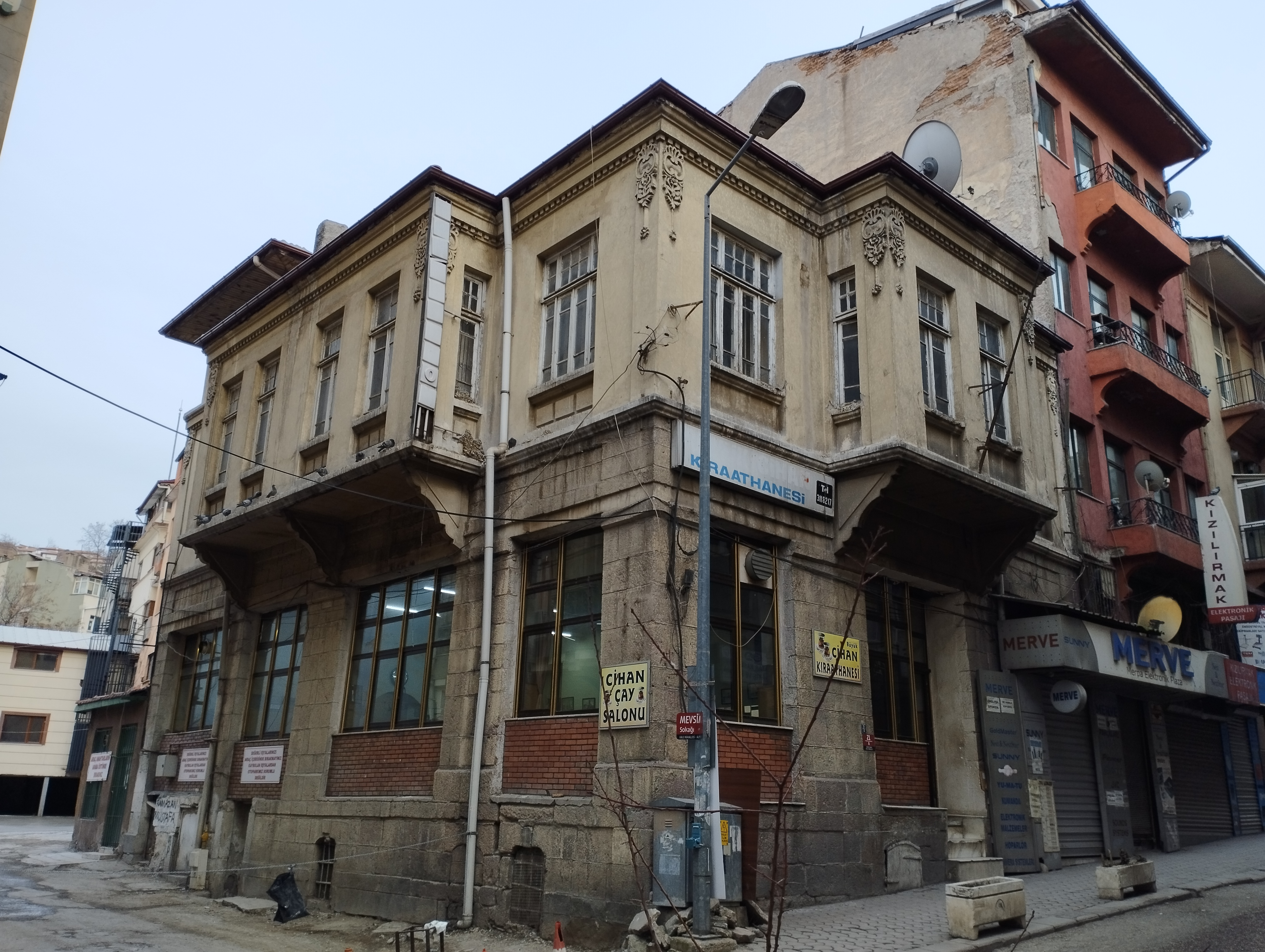
Konya sokak 3 - Ulus - Ankara

== See also ==
- 2007 Ankara bombing
