= Andrea Grill =

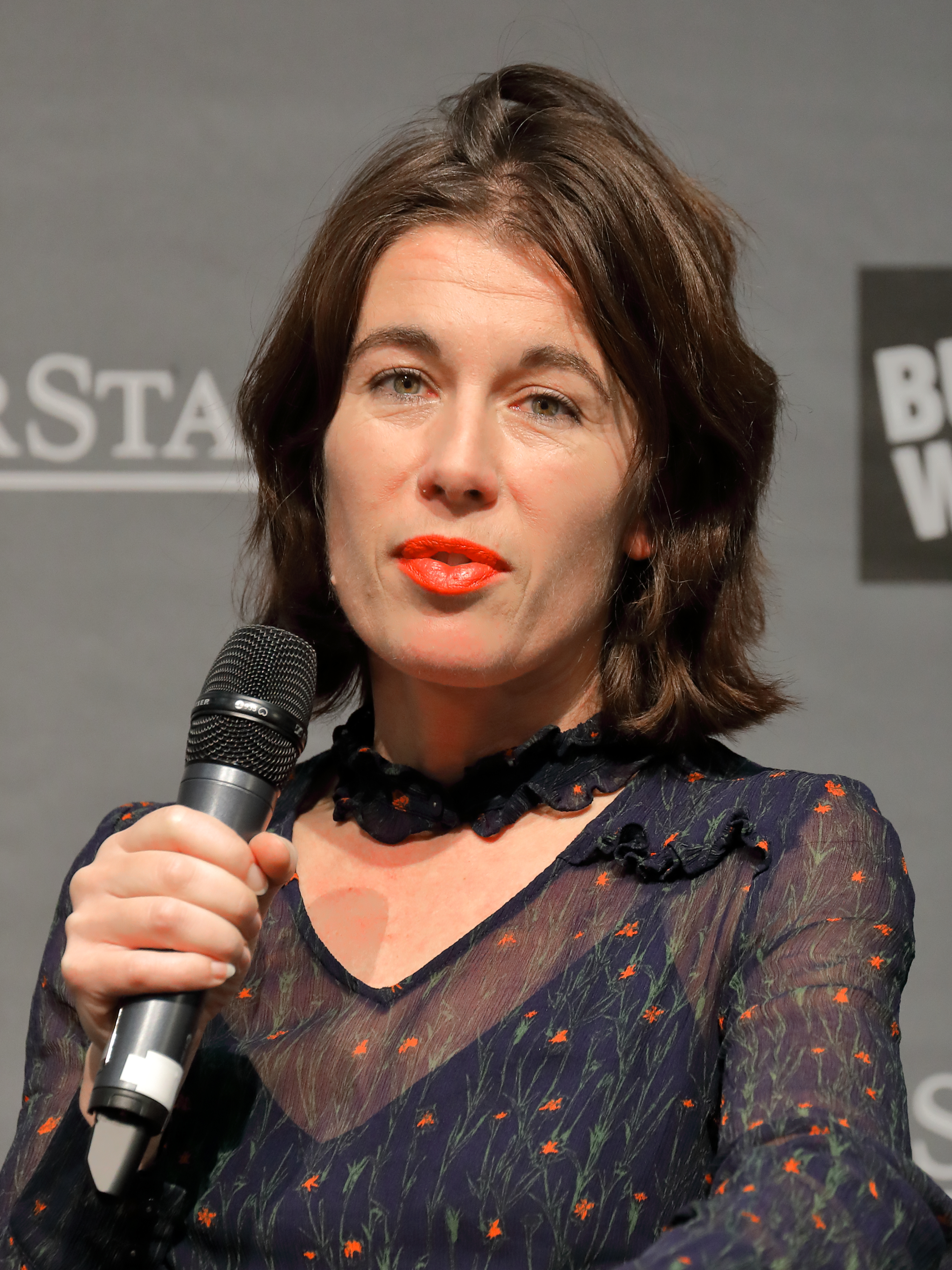
- Andrea Grill at Buch Wien in 2019
- Born: 16 January 1975 (age 51); Bad Ischl, Austria
- Occupations: writer, biologist

Andrea Grill (born 16 January 1975) is an Austrian writer and biologist.

== Biography ==
Andrea Grill studied biology, Italian, Spanish, and linguistics in Salzburg, Thessaloniki, and Tirana. She lived for several years in Cagliari, Sardinia, and received her doctorate in 2003 from the University of Amsterdam with a dissertation on Sardinian butterflies. Alongside her literary work, she was active in scientific research for many years and translates from Albanian. In 2007, she participated in the Ingeborg Bachmann Prize competition in Klagenfurt. After periods in Amsterdam, Neuchâtel, Bologna, Tirana, and Bern, she now lives in Vienna. She has been a fellow at the Literarisches Colloquium Berlin, at Schloss Wiepersdorf, and at the German House of NYU in New York.

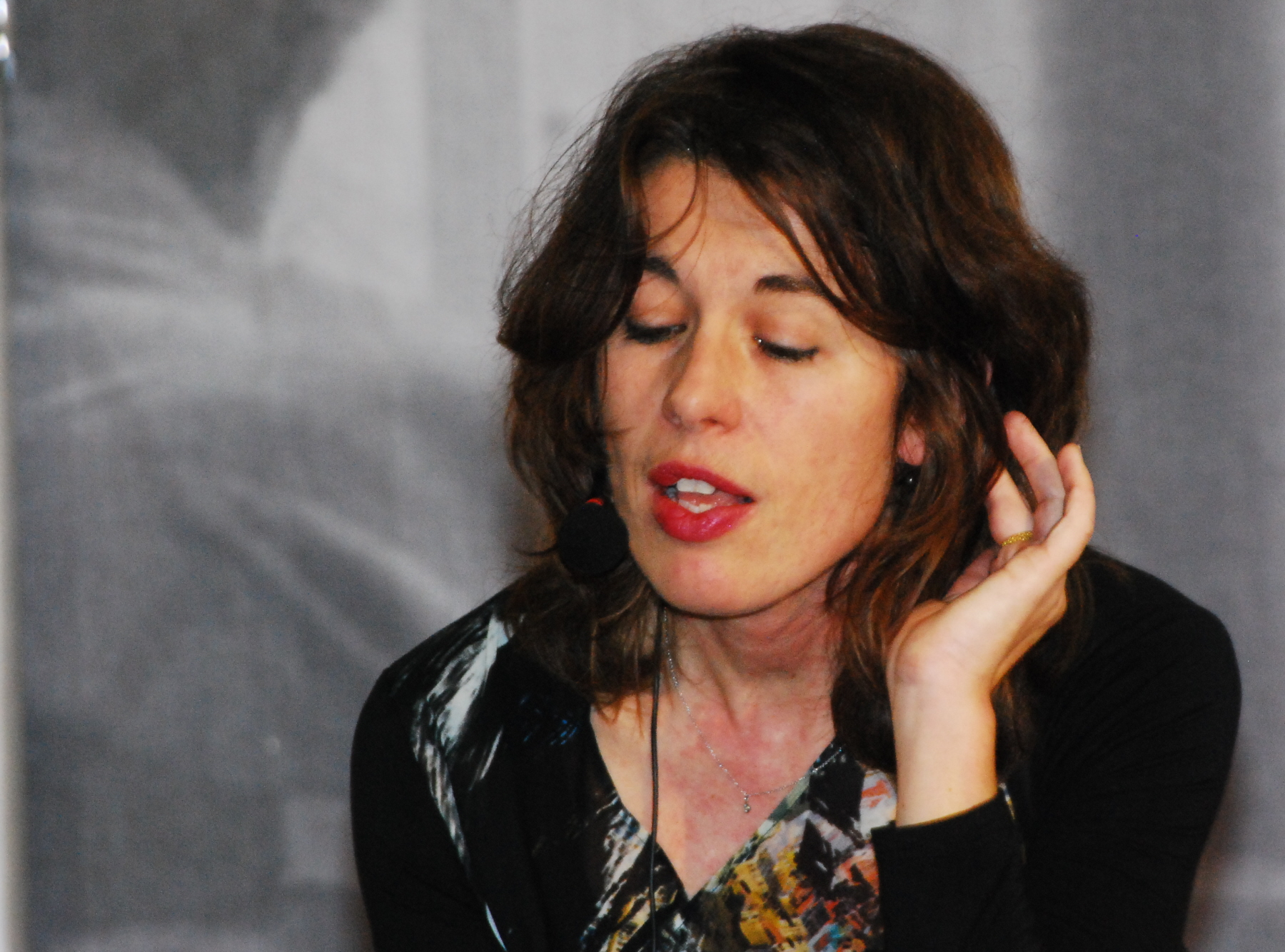
Andrea Grill in 2012

In her novel Cherubino (2019), inspired by the character of the same name from Mozart's opera Le nozze di Figaro, Grill deconstructs the contemporary ideal of the self-determined woman. She tells the story of a 39-year-old mezzo-soprano who wants to live alone but not in isolation. Her planned pregnancy, however, jeopardizes her future as a soprano, so she plays a game of hide-and-seek with herself and the world. Cherubino was longlisted for the German Book Prize in 2019.

== Works ==
- Endemism in Sardinia. Evolution, ecology, and conservation of the butterfly Maniola nurag. Amsterdam 2003.
- Der gelbe Onkel. Ein Familienalbum. Otto Müller Verlag, Salzburg/Wien 2005, ISBN 978-3-7013-1105-7.
- Zweischritt. Otto Müller Verlag, Salzburg/Wien 2007, ISBN 978-3-7013-1125-5.
- Tränenlachen. Roman. Otto Müller Verlag, Salzburg/Wien 2008, ISBN 978-3-7013-1153-8.
- Das Schöne und das Notwendige. Roman. Otto Müller Verlag, Salzburg/Wien 2010, ISBN 978-3-7013-1169-9.
- Happy Bastards. Gedichte. Otto Müller Verlag, Salzburg/Wien 2011, ISBN 978-3-7013-1188-0.
- Auf nach Salzburg. Verborgenes, Skurriles, Kulinarisches. Folio Verlag, Wien/Bozen 2011, ISBN 978-3-85256-553-8.
- Liebesmaschine N.Y.C. Otto Müller Verlag, Salzburg 2012, ISBN 978-3-7013-1199-6.
- Safari, innere Wildnis. Gedichte. Otto Müller Verlag, Salzburg 2014, ISBN 978-3-7013-1217-7.
- Das Paradies des Doktor Caspari. Paul Zsolnay Verlag, Wien 2015, ISBN 978-3-552-05744-9.
- Schmetterlinge. Ein Portrait. Verlag Matthes & Seitz Berlin, Berlin 2016, ISBN 978-3-95757-249-3.
- Fiffy + Maurice. Bilderbuch. Mit Bildern von Deborah Sengl. Luftschacht Verlag, Wien 2019, ISBN 978-3-903081-35-2.
- Cherubino. Roman. Paul Zsolnay Verlag, Wien 2019, ISBN 978-3-552-05949-8.
- stadtlandflussgetier.org. Gedichte (zusammen mit Anja Utler), www.stadtlandflussgetier.org
- Sam und die Evolution. Eine kurze Geschichte der Evolutionsbiologie. Illustriert von Raffaela Schöbitz. Tyrolia Verlag, Wien 2022.
- Bio-Diversi-Was? Reise in die fantastische Welt der Artenvielfalt. Kinderbuch. Leykam, Wien/Graz 2023, ISBN 978-3-7011-8288-6.
- Seepferdchen. Ein Portrait. Verlag Matthes & Seitz Berlin, Berlin 2023, ISBN 978-3-7518-4002-6.
- Perfekte Menschen. Roman. Leykam, Wien/Graz 2024, ISBN 978-3-7011-8321-0.
- Sonnenspiel. Roman. Leykam, Wien/Graz 2026, ISBN 978-3-7011-8393-7.

== Translations ==
- Mimoza Ahmeti: Milchkuss. Roman. Aus dem Albanischen von Andrea Grill. Otto Müller Verlag, Salzburg 2009.
- Jeton Neziraj: Yue Madeleine Yue. S. Fischer Theaterverlag, Frankfurt 2012.
- Ervina Halili: Der Schlaf des Oktopus. Aus dem Albanischen von Andrea Grill. Edition Korrespondenzen, Wien 2016.
- Luljeta Lleshanaku: Stadt der Äpfel. Gedichte. Aus dem Albanischen, ausgewählt und mit einem Nachwort von Andrea Grill. Hanser, München 2021.

== Awards and nominations ==
- 2010 Otto-Stoessl-Preis
- 2011 Förderpreis Bremer Literaturpreis
- 2013 Förderpreis für Literatur der Stadt Wien
- 2019 Deutscher Buchpreis – Longlist (Cherubino)
- 2021 Anton-Wildgans-Preis
- 2023 Wissenschaftsbuch des Jahres – nominiert
- 2024 Wissenschaftsbuch des Jahres – Shortlist
- 2024 Kinder- und Jugendbuchpreis der Stadt Wien für Bio-Diversi-Was? Reise in die fantastische Welt der Artenvielfalt

== Literature ==
- Theo Breuer: Zwanzig Tage – Zwanzig Romane: Ein Buchspiel. In: Matrix. Zeitschrift für Literatur und Kunst, 58. Ausgabe, Pop Verlag, Ludwigsburg 2019, S. 7–167.
