= This Song Doesn't End Here =

1999 album by Erdoğan

Bu Şarkı Burada Bitmez

Studio album by Recep Tayyip Erdoğan
- Released: 26 March 1999
- Genre: Lyric poetry
- Length: 35:45
- Label: Ulus Music
- Producer: İskender Ulus

This Song Doesn't End Here (Turkish: Bu Şarkı Burada Bitmez) is an album by Turkish politician Recep Tayyip Erdoğan. It was released on 26 March 1999, the same day that Erdoğan, then mayor of Istanbul, went to prison due to statements he made during a speech in a public gathering in Siirt on 6 December 1997. The album includes seven poems and a song. İskender Ulus undertook the production of the album, which was released under the Ulus Music label.

On the back cover of the album it was reported that all of the royalties that Erdoğan received from this album would be donated to the families of martyrs, widows, orphans and criminals of thought (via the Turkish Authors' Association). The album became the best-selling album of Turkey in 1999, selling over one million copies.

== Track listing ==
No.	Title	Writer(s)	Length
1.	"Zindandan Mehmed'e Mektup" (A Letter to Mehmed from prison)	Necip Fazıl Kısakürek	7:12
2.	"Sana Bana Vatanıma Ülkemin İnsanlarına Dair" (About You, Me, My Country, My Country's People)	Erdem Bayazıt	6:42
3.	"Bizim Yaşadığımız" (Ours Is Life as Well)	İbrahim Sadri	3:57
4.	"Canım İstanbul" (My Dear Istanbul)	Necip Fazıl Kısakürek	4:55
5.	"Beni Yakışına"	Nurullah Genç	3:40
6.	"Hayal Limanına Demirleyen Yelkenliyle" (Anchored in the Dream Harbor with Sailboat)	Nurullah Genç	3:06
7.	"Birazdan Gün Doğacak" (Soon the Sun Will Rise)	Erdem Bayazıt	3:39
8.	"Samanyol" (Milky Way)	Teoman Alpay	2:01
Total length:			35:45

== See also ==
- A Fairer World Is Possible
