= Nurullah =

Nurullah (Arabic: نورالله) is a masculine given name of Arabic origin, meaning light of God of Muslim origin. It is derived from the Arabi word nur, meaning light, and Allah, meaning God. It may also be romanized as Noorullah, Norullah, or Nourullah.

People named Nurullah include:

- Qazi Nurullah Shustari (1542–1610/11), Persian jurist (faqih) and scholar
- M. Nurullah Tuncer (born 1959), Turkish theatre director
- Nurullah Genç (born 1960), Turkish poet and novelist
- Nurullah Tevfik Ağansoy (1960–1996), Turkish mob boss
- Nurullah Sağlam (born 1966), Turkish football coach
- Noorullah (cricketer), Afghan cricketer
- Noorullah Noori, Afghan governor
- Nourallah Tabresi, Iranian cleric

== Places ==
- Nurollah Beyglu, village in Iran
- Nurulla Mosque, in Kazan, Russia

== See also ==
- List of Arabic theophoric names
