= Bilge Emin =

Turkish theatre director and translator

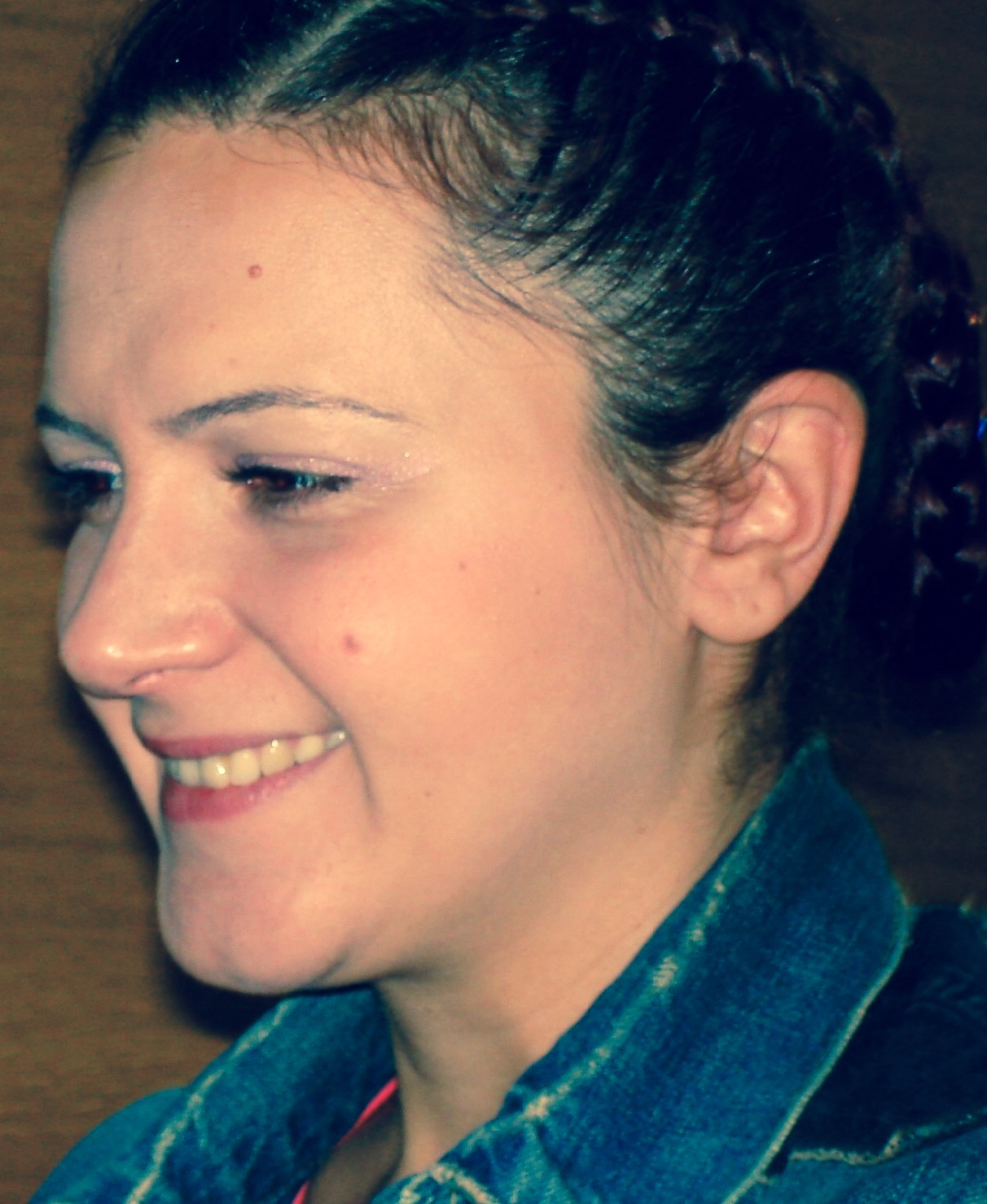
- Born: 15 August 1976 (age 49); Skopje, SR Macedonia, SFR Yugoslavia
- Citizenship: North Macedonia–Turkey
- Occupations: Theatre director; translator
- Agent: Mitos Boyut

Bilge Emin (born 15 August 1976) is a theatre director and translator working in Turkey and the Balkans. She is known for translating plays from Balkan languages into Turkish, including works by Serbian playwright Dušan Kovačević.

== Life ==
Emin was born in 1976 in Skopje. Her mother is the journalist Emire Emin; her father is the writer İlhami Emin, a representative of Turkish literature in North Macedonia. She encountered theatre at an early age due to her family background.

She pursued higher education in Turkey and graduated from the Journalism Department of Ankara University in 2000. She received a master's degree in the Radio, Television and Cinema program with a thesis titled Women in the Cinema of Halit Refiğ.

She later undertook graduate studies in theatre directing at the Faculty of Dramatic Arts of Ss. Cyril and Methodius University of Skopje. She completed her degree with a thesis based on Marius von Mayenburg’s play The Stone, which she directed at the Skopje Turkish Theatre.

She has translated plays by playwrights such as Dušan Kovačević, Deyan Dukovski, Jeton Neziraj, and Lyubomir Djurković. In 2010, she received the Translator of the Year award at the 8th Theatre Awards organized by Tiyatro... Tiyatro... magazine for her translation of Kovačević’s play The Dress Rehearsal for the Suicide.

As a dramaturg and assistant director, she worked with directors including Rahim Burhan, Nikita Milivojević, Martin Kočovski, and Macit Koper. She received the Director of the Year award at the 4th Rotary Theatre Awards (2015–2016) for the play If This Were a Film....

In 2018, she received the Achievement Award at the 5th Anatolian Theatre Awards.

She has served on juries and selection committees at international theatre festivals, including the Risto Šiškov International Chamber Theatre Festival, the MOT International Theatre Festival, the European Theatre Festival, and the Baghdad International Theatre Festival.

== Selected works ==
(Complete lists preserved in draft history; selected works listed here in accordance with English Wikipedia style.)

=== Theatre productions directed ===
- If This Were a Film... (2015)
- The Stone (2013)
- A Doll’s House, Part 2 (2023)
- No Electricity for the Electric Chair (2024)

=== Translations into Turkish ===
- The Dress Rehearsal for the Suicide – Dušan Kovačević
- The Balkan Spy – Dušan Kovačević
- Spring in January / Underground – Dušan Kovačević

== Awards ==
- Translator of the Year – Tiyatro... Tiyatro... Awards (2010)
- Director of the Year – Rotary Theatre Awards (2015–2016)
- Achievement Award – Anatolian Theatre Awards (2018)
