= M. Nurullah Tuncer =

M.Nurullah Tuncer
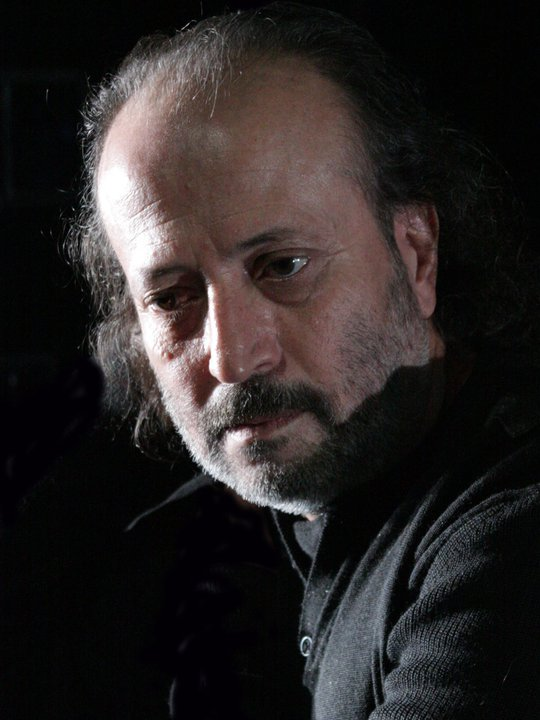
- Born: 1959 (age 66–67); ERCİŞ Turkey
- Education: Mimar Sinan University
- Occupations: Theatre Director, stage designer, costume designer

M.Nurullah Tuncer (born 1959 in Van, Turkey), graduated from Mimar Sinan University, Faculty of Fine Arts, Department of Stage and Costume Design with his B.A. and master's degrees. He then worked as an academic for Mimar Sinan University, Department of stage and visual arts from 1985 till 2002. He has been an artist of Istanbul Municipality City Theatres since 1985 as well. He has contributed more than a hundred plays within the company as a stage designer, costume designer and lighting designer. He paints oil paintings since 1987 and has exhibited twice in Istanbul in 1990 and 1996.

== Stage designer ==
- 2016 "Empty Rooms" by Stanislav Stratiev, directed by Bilge Emin - Trabzon State Theatre
- 2015 " Under The Table" by Roland Topor, directed by Bilge Emin - Skopje Albanian National Theatre
- 2013 Marius von Mayenburg's "The Stone", directed by Bilge Emin - Skopje Turkish National Theatre
- 2010 "Red", based on the novel My Name is Red by Orhan Pamuk, directed by Martin Kocovski - Festival MESS-Sarajevo, Festival Exponto-Ljubljana, Montenegrin National Theater, Small Drama Theater-Bitola, National Theatre Sarajevo, National Theatre Bitola, Primorski Summer Festival-Koper, Production B.M.-Skopje.
- 2009 "Black Pen" by Jordan Plevnes & İlhami Emin, directed by Vlado Cvetanovski - Skopje Turkish National Theatre
- 2008 Molière's "Tartuffe", directed by Rahim Burhan - Kosovo National Theatre
- 2008 "The Castle" by Mesa Selimovic, adapted and directed by Nebojsa Bradic - Kruchevo Theatre/Belgrade Drama Theatre
- 2007 "La Bohème" by Giacomo Puccini, directed by Sulejman Kupusović - Sarajevo National Opera and Theatre
- 2006 "The Merry Widow" by Franz Lehár, directed by Stephanie Jamnicky - Croatia National Theatre and Opera

== Theatre director ==
- 2016 "Peacetime" by Ahmet Hamdi Tanpınar, adapted by Kenan Işık - Istanbul State Theatre
- 2015 "The General of the Dead Army" by İsmail Kadare, adapted by Jeton Neziraj - Istanbul Municipal Theatre
- 2014 ""General Rehearsal of Suicide" by Dusan Kovacevic - Van State Theatre
- 2013 "Yunus Emre" by Recep Bilginer - Sivas State Theatre
- 2012 "Life in Tight Shoes" bu Dusan Kovacevic - Istanbul Municipal Theatre
- 2011 "The Gathering Place" by Dusan Kovacevic - Istanbul Municipal Theatre
- 2010 "Somewhere in the Middle of the World" by Özen Yula - Istanbul Municipal Theatre
- 2009 "General Rehearsal of Suicide" by Dusan Kovacevic - Istanbul Municipal Theatre
- 2009 "The Dervish and Death" by Mesa Selimovic, adapted by Nebojsa Bradic - Kocaeli Municipal Theatre
- 2008 "Somewhere in the Middle of the World" by Özen Yula - Bosnia National Theatre
- 2007 "Titanic Orchestra" by Hristo Boytchev - Qatar Theatre Group
- 2006 "Ocra with Minced Meat in Pressure Cooker" by Mehmet Baydur - Bosnian National Theatre
- 2006 "Mannequin" by Dala Al Rahbi - Syria National Theatre

He has received numerous national and international theatre awards. The plays he directed have been performed at many theatre festivals.
