= Küçük Theatre =

Theatre stage in Ankara, Turkey

- Küçük Tiyatro
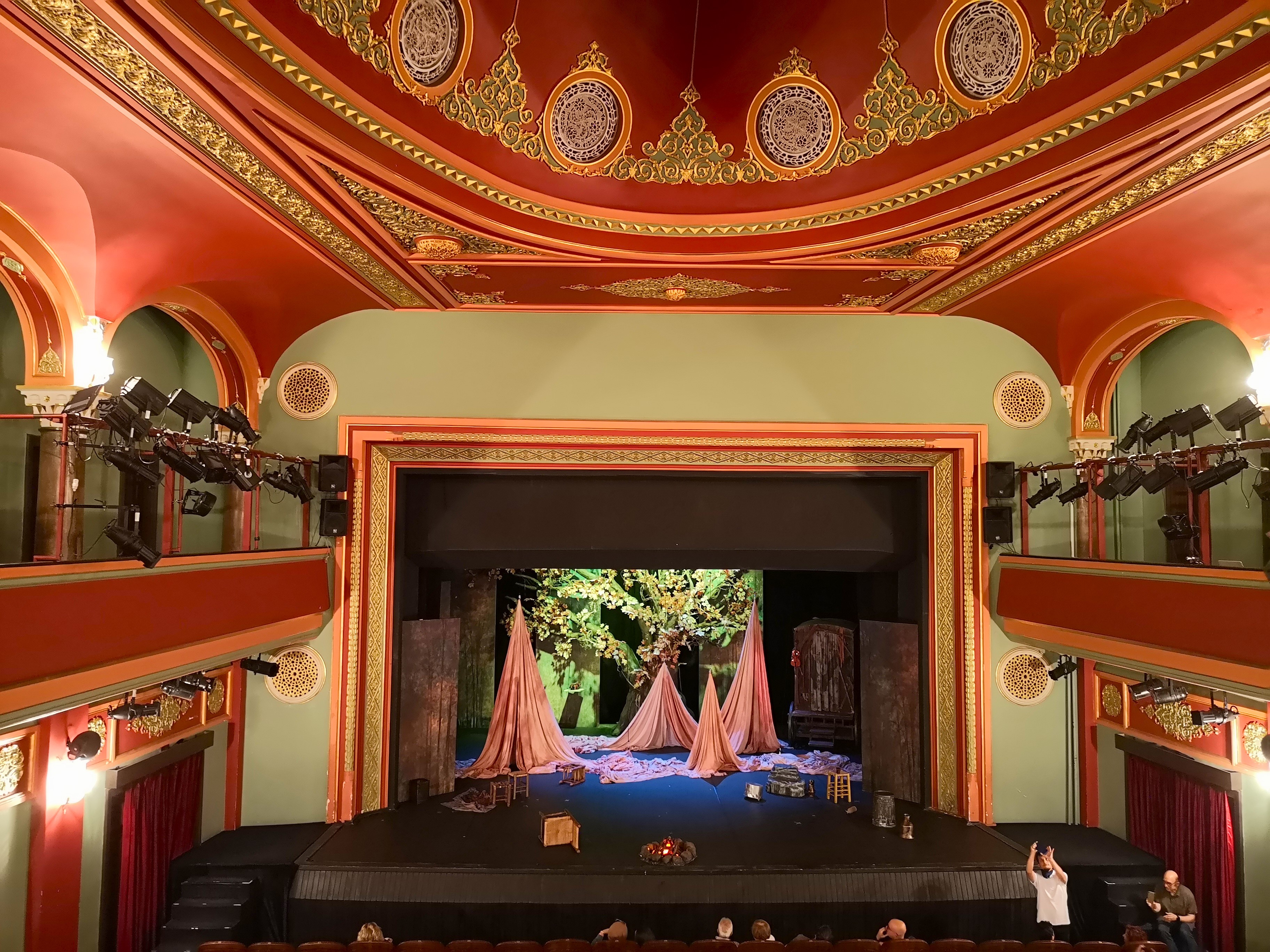
- The decor for the play 'Periferi' staged on the Küçük Theatre
- Interactive map of Küçük Theatre
- Location: Altındağ, Ankara, Turkey
- Owner: Directorate General of Foundations (Turkey)
- Operator: Turkish State Theatres
- Type: Theatre stage

Construction
- Built: 1930
- Opened: December 27, 1947
- Years active: 1947–present
- Architect: Mimar Kemaleddin

Küçük Theatre is a theatre stage located in Altındağ District of Ankara. Although it is the oldest theatre in the city, it was renamed as Küçük (Little) Theatre after the counstruction of Büyük Theatre (Grand Theatre). Together with Oda Theatre and General Directorate of Turkish State Theatres, it is located inside of II. Evkaf Apartmanı. Today, it is actively used in performances staged by the Ankara State Theatre.

== History ==
Today's Küçük Theatre was originally planned as a private theatre hall of II. Evkaf Apartmanı which was built by the architect Ahmed Kemaleddin. Despite its completion during the early 1930s, there were not any theater company in Ankara at that time. Thus, this stage remained unused for a long time. In 1940, when the Musiki Muallim Mektebi (Music Teachers' School) was converted into the Ankara State Conservatory and a theatre class was opened, the stage was rented by the Ministry of National Education and converted into a warehouse for the sets of plays performed at the school.

In 1947, Muhsin Ertuğrul, who was appointed to lead the Tatbikat Sahnesi (Practice Stage) during that period, decided to convert that storage space back into a theater stage again for facilitating the performances of conservatory students. With the support of Reşat Şemsettin Sirer, Rüştü Uzel, Halil Vedat Fıratlı, Tevfik Ararat, Abidin Mortaş and Ahmet Kutsi Tecer, the stage underwent a couple of renovation works and finally on 27 October 1947, it has started to host regular performances. Tecer's play "Köşebaşı" (Corner) was the f first premiere of Küçük Theatre. That play, which was staged 56 times until 15 February 1948, broke a record as one of the most frequently performed plays in a single season in Turkey. Additionally, as a part of the children's theatre initiatives during this period, Mümtaz Zeki Taşhan's plays "Altın Bilezik" (The Golden Bracelet) and "Karaböcek" (Black Beetle), along with Afif Obay's play "Büyükbabanın Pireleri" (Grandfather's Fleas), were also staged at the Küçük Tiyatro, introducing approximately 41,000 children to theater by the end of 1949.

While those two-year period lasted until 1949 marked the preparatory and transitional phase before the establishment of the State Theaters, Küçük Tiyatro witnessed the significant milestones in the history of Turkish theater during the Republican era. Artists such as Mahir Canova, Madde Tanır, Cüneyt Gökçer, Muazzez Lutas, Salih Canar and Saim Alpago performed at the Küçük Tiyatro during this period. Right after the establishment of the Ankara State Theatre, the first play staged here became Cevat Fehmi Başkut's "Küçük Şehir" (Small Town) on 1 October 1949.

== Architecture ==
Küçük Theatre is designed with an elliptical dome over a rectangular plan. In contrast to the plain architecture of the building, it can be said that the stage is decorated with quite elaborate interior embellishments. Besides the golden embroidered dome and gilding on the ceiling, muqarnas and arched columns are frequently featured. The walls, painted in dark colors, are accompanied by parquet flooring and buttoned wooden seats.

With a proscenium stage system, the stage is separated from the audience area via a raised platform, and there is no orchestra pit in front of it. Considering the physical characteristics of the stage, it is observed to be more suitable for the staging of theater plays and musicals. The audience section is constructed in two stages, consisting of the main hall and a "U"-shaped balcony. While the balcony has a curved and sloping plan, the seats in the main hall are arranged in a straight manner. The clear usage area of the hall is 472 m^{2} with a total volume of 4680 m³. The current seating capacity is 467.
