= Buch Wien =

International book fair in Vienna

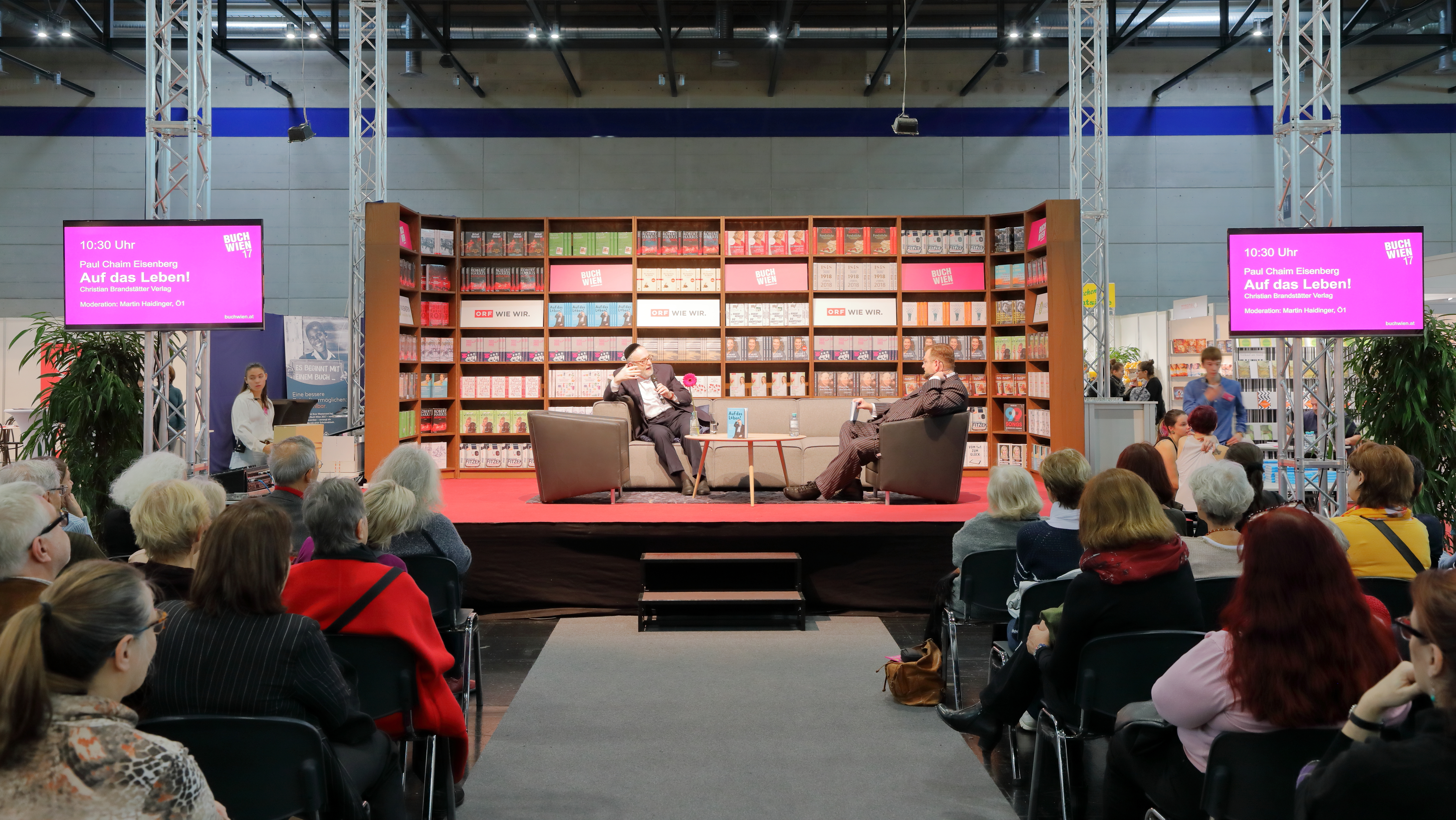
Buch Wien 17: ORF stage with Oberrabbi Paul Chaim Eisenberg and moderator Martin Haidinger

Buch Wien is a four-day international book fair in Vienna, which takes place annually in November on the grounds of the Messe Wien in the Hall D. A total of around 400 events will take place as part of "Buch Wien". Since 2014, Buch Wien has started with the "Long Night of Books" the night before the fair.

== General ==
Readings, autograph sessions, discussions and new publications of all genres - fiction and crime, cooking and non-fiction, world literature - are part of the program. The children's and youth program includes workshops, readings and talks on various topics such as comics, classic media and social networks and journalistic production. The organizer of the fair is Literatur- und Contentmarketing Ges.m.b.H., owned by the Main Association of the Austrian Book Trade (HVB).

With the introduction of the 2008 Buch Wien, there is also the newly created Reading Festival Week, which is supported by the City of Vienna and the Federal Ministry of Education. As part of this Reading Festival Week, readings, author talks, book signings, and discussion events take place at various locations in Vienna.

== History and statistics ==
Buch Wien has existed in its current form since 2008 and replaced Book Week, which had been held in the Vienna City Hall since 1948 with free admission. Buch Wien lasts for four days and can be visited with a valid ticket.

The first trade fair was opened by the Federal President Heinz Fischer and had around 21,600 visitors and therefore only about a third of the visitors compared to the previous event in the town hall. There were 271 exhibitors from 14 countries, presenting around 500 editorials and 6 scenarios. Together with the Reading Festival Week, 31,100 people interested in Literature mobilized at their will. In the second fair of 2009 there were 228 exhibitors from eleven countries with 25,042 visitors. Together with the Reading Festival Week there were 34,500 visitors.

In 2011, the writer and literary critic Günter Kaindlstorfer took over the direction of the BUCH WIEN program from Gabriele Madeja.

On the 10-year anniversary in 2017, a new audience record was set with 48,500 visitors. There were a total of 451 events with 381 authors and 350 exhibitors from 20 countries, providing 8,000 square meters of exhibition space.

In 2018, the exhibition area was expanded to 11,000 m^{2}. There were 51,000 visitors, the number of exhibitors was 370 and more than 400 events were organized.

The twelfth book fair in 2019 had 55,000 visitors, which in turn set a new record. The area was expanded by 1,000 m^{2} to 12,000 m^{2}. A total of 385 exhibitors from 25 countries presented their publishers and institutions. 575 authors and contributors participated in more than 500 events over five days at the fair and at 35 locations in Vienna.

In 2020, the event was canceled due to the COVID-19 pandemic.

In 2021, the book fair took place under pandemic conditions and had 41,000 visitors. The area was 12,150m² in which the exhibitors presented themselves. 513 authors and contributors participated in more than 400 events over five days at the fair and at 23 locations in Vienna.

== The Long Night of Books ==
In 2014, the first Long Night of Books took place, which has since opened Buch Wien. On Wednesday evening, the exhibit hall opens its doors and invites readers to a series of exciting and entertaining events, including a concert, numerous readings and book signings, and a public contest. The keynote speech is a highlight and is considered the beginning of the book fair.

== Keynote speaker since 2008 ==
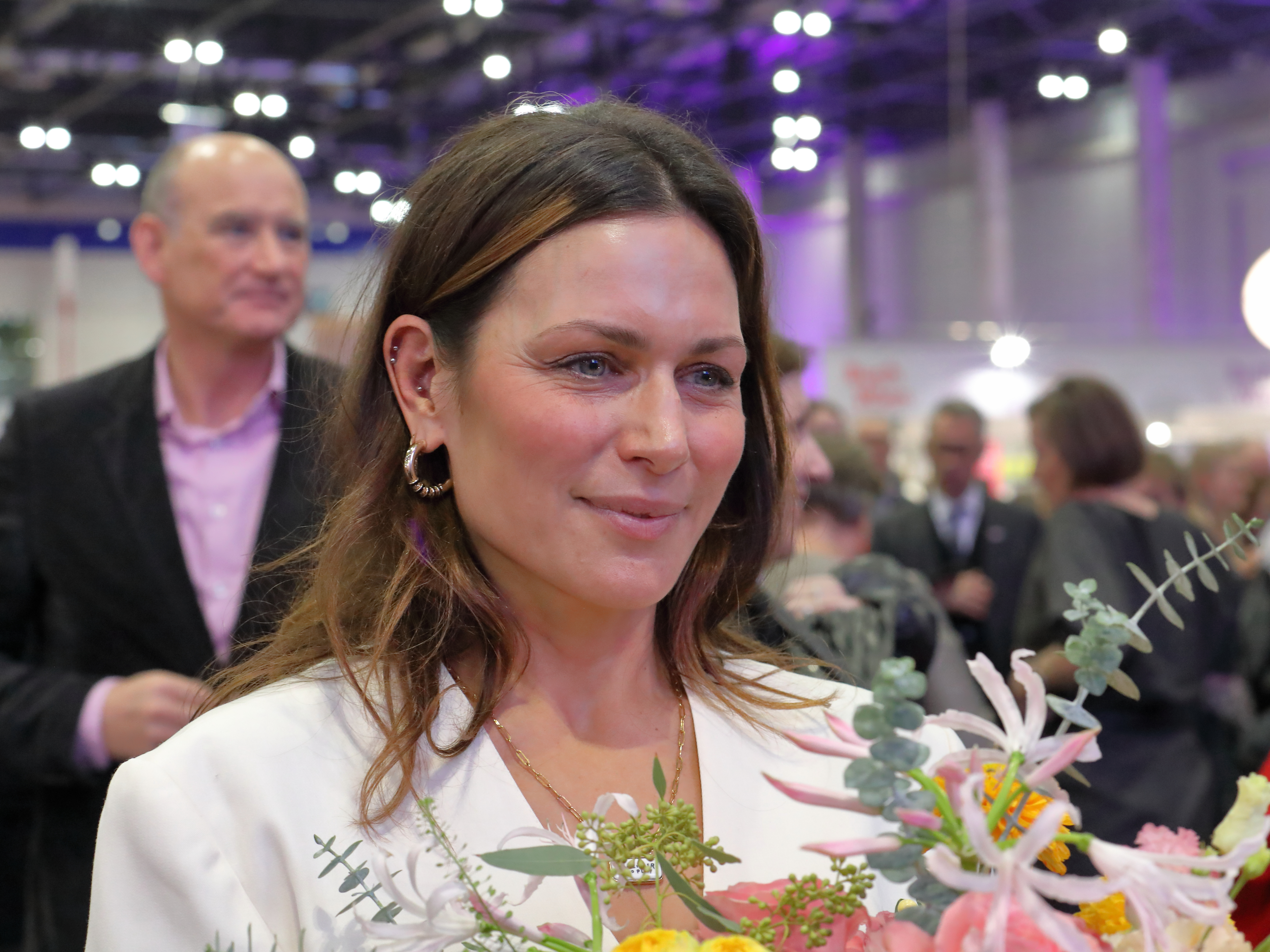
Shila Behjat, keynote speaker 2025

- Shila Behjat (2025)
- Julian Nida-Rümelin (2024)
- A. L. Kennedy (2023)
- Herfried Munkler (2022)
- Isolda Charim (2021)
- Armin Thurnher (2019)
- Svenja Flasspoehler (2018)
- Karl-Markus Gauss (2017)
- Terezia Mora (2016)
- Adolf Muschg (2015)
- Yuri Andrukhovych (2014)
- Sibylle Lewitscharoff (2013)
- Carl Djerassi (2012)
- Petros Markaris (2011)
- Christian Ankowitsch (2010)
- Eva Menasse (2009)
- Ilija Trojanow (2008)
