= A Fairer World Is Possible =

Book written by Recep Tayyip Erdoğan

- Author: Recep Tayyip Erdoğan
- Original title: Daha Adil Bir Dünya Mümkün
- Language: Turkish, English, Arabic, German, French, Russian, Spanish
- Published: 2021 (Turkuvaz Kitap)
- Publisher: Turkuvaz Kitap
- Publication place: Turkey
- Pages: 216 pages
- ISBN: 6257548179

A Fairer World Is Possible (Turkish: Daha Adil Bir Dünya Mümkün) is a non-fiction book by Turkish president Recep Tayyip Erdoğan which was published in seven languages in 2021.

== Overview ==
The book, which sets out with the doctrine "The world is bigger than 5", states that the global politics should not rest on a small minority of countries. The book touches on the duties of the United Nations for a sustainable and fair world.

In the book, global problems such as injustice, corruption, the refugee crisis, the world's spectacle of what is happening in the Middle East, international terrorism and Islamophobia are addressed.
