= Messe Wien =

Trade fair in Austria

Coordinates: 48.2164°N 16.4089°E

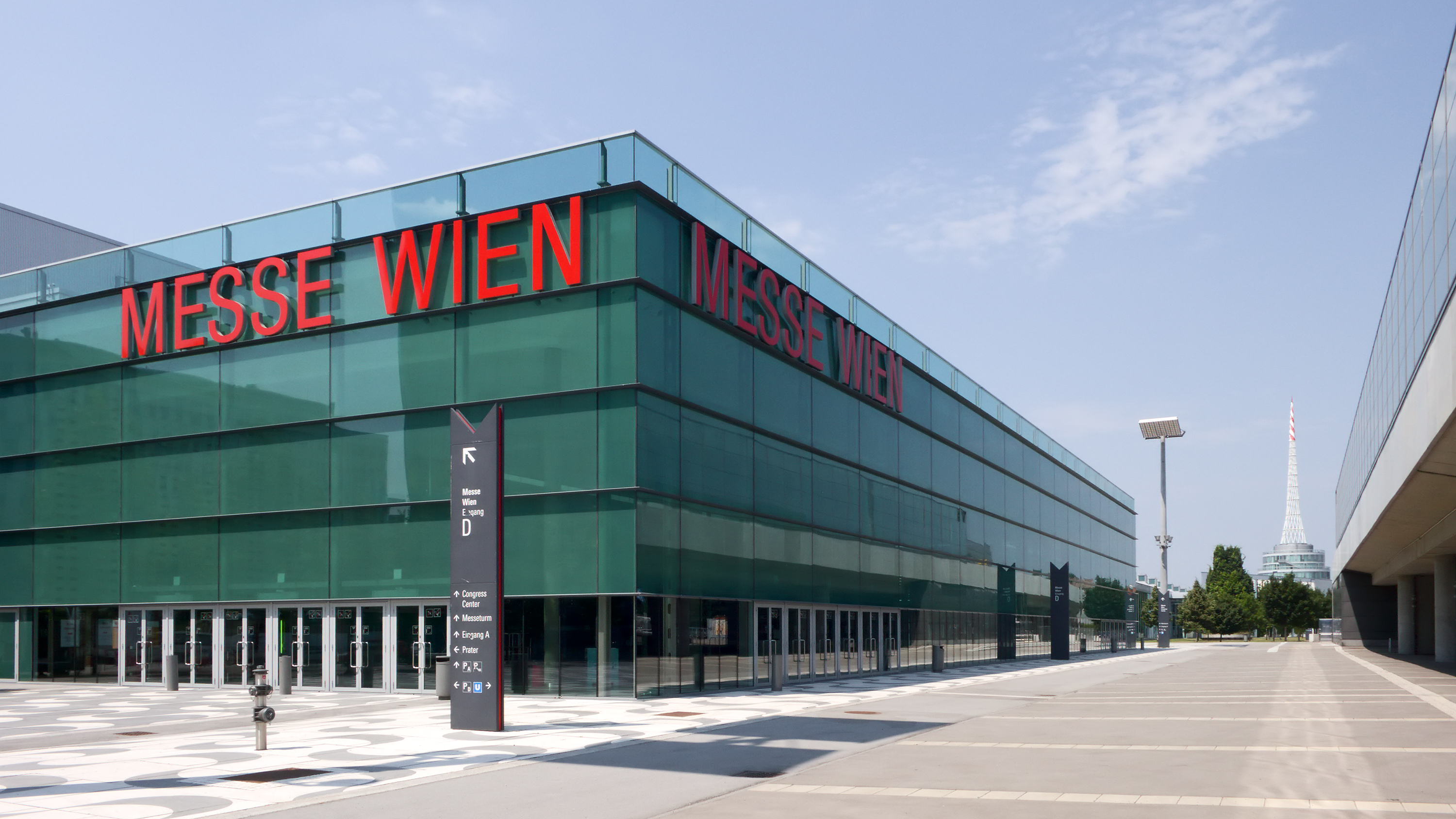
East facade, Messe Wien

Messe Wien (English: Trade Fair of Vienna) is the biggest trade fair in Austria and one of the most important economic factors of Vienna. This venue failed to win the bid for hosting the Eurovision Song Contest 2015, after Conchita Wurst won the final in 2014.
