= Deborah Sengl =

Austrian artist

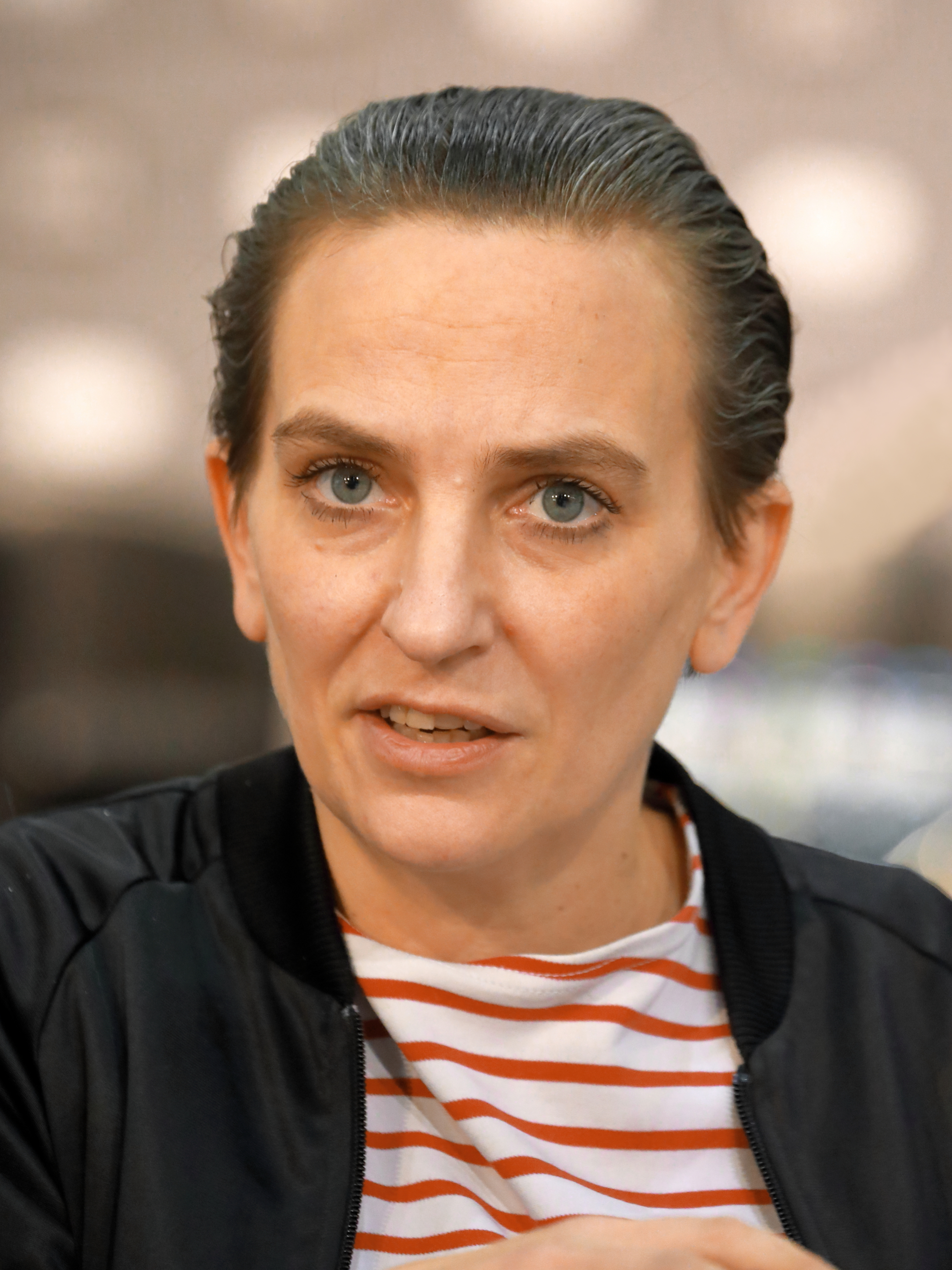
- Born: 2 January 1974 (age 52); Vienna, Austria
- Education: University of Applied Arts Vienna (1997)
- Known for: Painting; Sculpture
- Website: Official website

Deborah Sengl (born 2 January 1974) is an Austrian painter and artist. She attended the University of Applied Arts Vienna and received a diploma in 1997. Sengl is the daughter of the painter Peter Sengl and the artist Susanne Lacombe.
