= Jeton Neziraj =

Kosovar playwright and writer (born 1977)

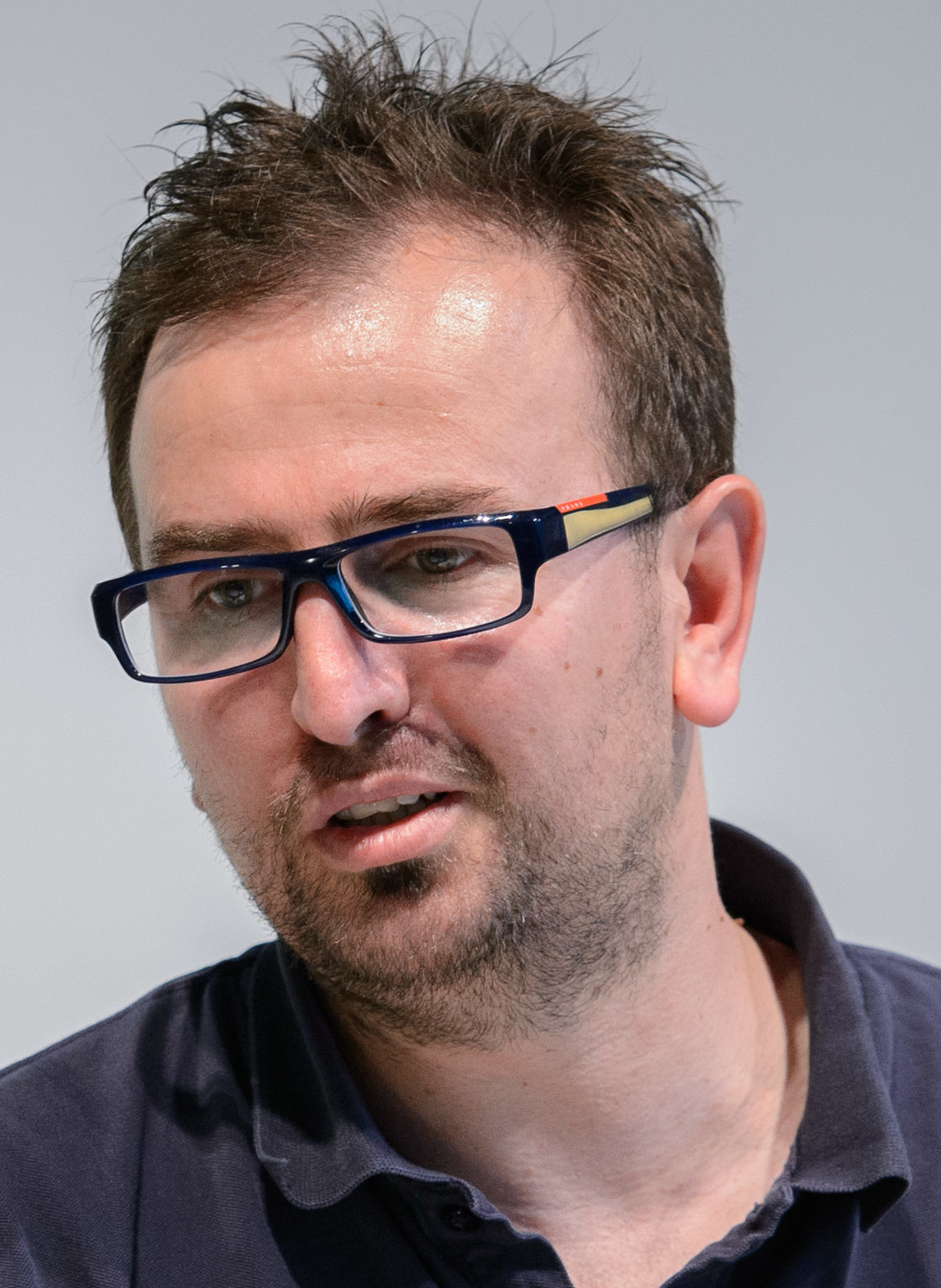
Jeton Neziraj, 2013

Jeton Neziraj is a playwright from Kosovo. He was the Artistic Director of the National Theatre of Kosovo and now he is the Director of Qendra Multimedia, a cultural production company based in Prishtina.

== Background ==
Neziraj has written over 25 plays that have been staged and performed in Europe as well as in the USA. His plays and his writings have been translated and published in more than 20 languages, such as: German, English, French, Italian, Slovak, Macedonian, Iranian, Slovenian, Croatian, Romanian, Bosnian, Spanish, Turkish, Bulgarian, Serbian, Greek etc.

As a playwright, he has worked and had his plays shown in various theatres, including La MaMa in New York, Volksbühne Berlin, Volkstheater Vienna, Piccolo Teatro di Milano, Vidy Theater in Lausanne, National Theater of Kosovo, City Garage Theater in Los Angeles, National Theater of Montenegro, Turkish National Theater, etc.

"The plays of Jeton Neziraj are raucous, irreverent and absurdist. They invoke Ibsen, Molière and Kafka...”, The Guardian wrote about his work. While the German theatre magazine Theater der Zeit and the German Radio Deutschlandfunk Kultur have described him as ‘Kafka of the Balkans’. Los Angeles Times called him “a world- class playwright who challenges our complacency at every twist and turn”.

Neziraj is the author of many articles on cultural and political issues, published in local and international magazines and journals. He is also the author of various books, including a book on the famous Kosovar actor Faruk Begolli. Neziraj is the founder and the director of Qendra Multimedia, a cultural production company based in Pristina. He was also Professor of Dramaturgy at the Faculty of Arts at the University of Pristina during the year 2007–2008. He has given speeches and has run theater workshops at several festivals, conferences and universities throughout the world.

He is member of the European Cultural Parliament and Kosovo coordinator of the EURODRAM network. He was board member of Dokufest (Prizren), and Kosovo patron for the New Plays from Europe Festival in Wiesbaden.

== Awards ==
- With his play Lisa is Sleeping he won the first prize at Buzuku competition for the best Albanian Play in 2006.
- He is the 2011 winner of the INPO prize for Accelerating the debate.
- His play One Flew Over the Kosovo Theater won the Special Award at the 8th edition of the JoakimInterFest (2013).
- He won the Best play award in the National Drama Festival in Ferizaj, 2016, for the play A Theater Play with Four Actors....
- In 2018, the European Union Office in Kosovo awarded him with the European of the Year award. This award is granted to individuals whose work and achievements have promoted European ideas and values.
- His play The Windmills (Die Windmühlen) was nominated for the German award Deutschen Kindertheaterpreis 2018.
- Neziraj is the winner of the EuropeCultureAward 2020
- He is winner of the International Theatremakers Award (2021) which is given by Playwrights Realm based in New York.
- His play The Handke Project won the French theatre award "Journées de Lyon des Auteurs de Théâtre".
- With his plays he won the "Katarina Josipi" award, in 2023 and 2024.

== Selected staged plays ==
=== 2025–2026 ===
- Under the Shade of a Tree I Sat and Wept - Qendra Multimedia (Prishtina, Kosovo), The Market Theatre (Johannesburg, South Africa), São Luiz Teatro Municipal (Lisboa, Portugal), Teatro Della Pergola (Firenze, Italy), Theater Dortmund (Dortmund, Germany), Black Box teater (Oslo, Norway), Mittelfest (Cividale del Friuli – Italy), Théâtre de la Ville (Paris, France).
- Fluturimi mbi Teatrin e Kosovës [One Flew Over the Kosovo Theatre] - City Theatre Ferizaj (Kosovo), 2025
- Prishtina – The Premeditated Killing of a Dream - Qendra multimedia (Prishtina, Kosovo), 2025
- ΠΤΗΣΗ / ΚΟΣΟΒΟ [One Flew Over the Kosovo Theatre] - Theatro Nous - Creative space (Athens, Greece), 2025
- The Handke Project - Norwegian Theatre Academy & Black Box teater / Oslo Internasjonale Teaterfestival (Norway), 2025
- Ojos de gato - Centro para las Artes TETIEM (Mexico), 2025

=== 2023–2024 ===
- Six Against Turkey - Qendra Multimedia (Kosovo) & Gerçek Tyiatrosu (Turkey), 2024
- The Internationals - Between the Seas: Mediterranean Performance LAB (Greece), 2024
- Bëje ose vdis - Gjakova City Theatre (Kosovo), 2024
- Balkan Bordello - Uppsala Stadsteaater (Sweden), 2024
- War in Times of Love - Bornova Belediyesi Sehir Tiyatrosu (Turkey), 2024
- Charles III - Qendra Multimedia (Kosovo), 2024
- Audience by Vaclav Havel - Tiyatro Teras Oyunculuk Atolye (Turkey), 2023
- Negotiating Peace - Qendra Multimedia in association with: Teatro della Pergola (Italy); euro-scene Leipzig (Germany); Prague City Theaters (Czech Republic); R.A.A.A.M (Estonia); Mittelfest (Italy); Kontakt (Bosnia and Herzegovina); Black Box Teater (Norway) and My Balkans (USA/Serbia), 2023
- GADJO (The Young Europeans) - Qendra Multimedia (Kosovo) and National Experimental Theatre "Kujtim Spahivogli" (Albania), 2023
- Peer Gynt from Kosovo - Tetovo City Theatre (North Macedonia), 2023
- One Flew Over the Kosovo Theatre - Kumanovo City Theatre (North Macedonia), 2023
- Audience by Vaclav Havel - National Experimental Theatre "Kujtim Spahivogli" (Albania), 2023

=== 2021–2022 ===
- A.P Department Acındırma Propaganda Birimi - Oyun Atölyesi, Istanbul, Turkey, 2022
- The Handke Project - Qendra Multimedia in association with Mittelfest & Teatro della Pergola (Italy), Theater Dortmund (Germany), National Theater Sarajevo & International Theater Festival - Scene MESS (Bosnia and Herzegovina), 2022
- Audience by Vaclav Havel Audients - RAAAM Theatre (Estonia), 2022
- Father and Father - Integra, Prishtina, Kosovo, 2022
- The Sworn Virgin - Qendra Multimedia, Prishtina, Kosovo, 2022
- Marxists-Leninists of Switzerland - Adriana' City Theatre, Ferizaj, Kosovo, 2022
- A Play with Four Actors and Some Pigs and Some Cows and Some Horses and a Prime Minister and a Milka Cow and Some Local and International Inspectors - Collectif7, Lyon - France (2021 - 2022)
- Balkan Bordello - La MaMa Theatre - New York, in association with Qendra Multimedia - Prishtina and Theater Atelje 212 - Belgrade
- Audience by Václav Havel (Radio play) - HRT - Hrvatski Radio, 2021
- Yue Madeleine Yue - (Το περιστατικό της Μαντλέν), Rialto Theatre - Θέατρο Ριάλτο, Limassol, Cyprus, 2021
- Kosovo for Dummies - City Theater, Gjilan, 2021
- Peer Gynt from Kosovo - (ΠΕΕΡ ΓΚΥΝΤ ΑΠΟ ΤΟ ΚΟΣΣΟΒΟ), Theatre Skala - ΘΕΑΤΡΟ ΣΚΑΛΑ, Larnaka, Cyprus, 2021

=== 2019–2020 ===
- The Bridge [Most] - Bosnian National Theater in Zenica, Bosnia and Hercegovina, 2020
- AUDIENCE BY VACLAV HAVEL - Qendra Multimedia, 2020
- ΠΤΗΣΗ 1702 08 ΚΟΣΣΟΒΟ [One Flew over the Kosovo Theater] - Θέατρο Τσέπης, Limassol, Cyprus, 2020
- The Return of Karl May - [Volksbühne Berlin, Qendra Multimedia, National Theater of Kosovo], Berlin, 2020
- Swiss Connection - Theater Winkelwiese, Zürich, 2020
- Şehir Büyüyor [Yue Madeleine Yue] - Tiyatro Tezgah, Istanbul, 2020
- a.y.l.a.n - City Theater, Gjilan, 2019
- In Five Seasons: An Enemy of the People - Qendra Multimedia, 2019
- Department of Dreams - City Garage Theatre, Los Angeles (2019)
- The Internationals - Between the Seas Festival and Theaterlab, New York (2019)
- 55 Shades of Gay - La MaMa - New York (2019)

=== 2017–2018 ===
- Peer Gynt from Kosovo (Kosovali Peer Gynt) - Turkish State Theater in Istanbul (2018)
- Lisa Is Sleeping Günah Çıkarma - Dina Tyiatro Turkey, 2018
- The Hypocrites or the English Patient - Qendra Multimedia, 2018
- Sworn Virgin - forever productions Zurich & Schlachthaus Theater Bern & Theater Winkelwiese Zürich & Kleintheater Luzern & Kellertheater Winterthur (2018)
- The Windmills (Mullinjët e erës) - CTC - Skopje/Shkup (2018)
- Mbreti Gjumash - City Theater - Kumanovë (2018)
- Patriotic Hypermarket - Théâtre de l’Opprimé // Théâtre national de Syldavie / Maison d’Europe et D’Orient - Paris (2017)
- 55 Shades of Gay - Qendra Multimedia (2017)
- Peer Gynt from Kosovo - Qendra Multimedia (2017)
- The Windmills (Die Windmühlen) - Theater Heilbronn (2017)
- Bordel Balkan - National Theater of Kosovo (2017)

=== 2015–2016 ===
- Carla del Ponte Trinkt in Pristina Einen Vanilla Chai Latte - Jochen Roller, Berlin, & FFT, Düsseldorf & Qendra Multimedia, Prishtina (2016)
- A Play with Four Actors and Some Pigs and Some Cows and Some Horses and a Prime Minister and a Milka Cow and Some Local and International Inspectors - Qendra Multimedia, Prishtina (2016)
- Lisa Is Sleeping (Lilza UYUYOR) - Menfi Tiyatro - Istanbul (2016)
- Yue Madeleine Yue (Şehir Büyüyor) - Tiyatro TEMAS - Istanbul (2016)
- KOSOVO FOR DUMMIES - Schlachthaus Theater Bern, Theater Winkelwiese Zürich, Kleintheater Luzern (2015)
- The Bridge - Spinning Dot Theatre - Michigan (2015)
- War in Times of Love (La Guerre au Temps de l’Amour) - THÉÂTRE DU GRENIER - Bougival / Compagnie GRAINS DE SCÈNE (2015)
- o.rest.es in Peace - National Theater of Montenegro (2015)
- General of the Dead Army (adaptation of the Ismail Kadare's novel) - Istanbul Municipal Theater (2015)
- War in Times of Love - Qendra Multimedia (2015)

=== 2013–2014 ===
- In Paradise Artists Can Fly - Qendra Multimedia, Prishtina (Kosovo) & Pisa (Italy), 2014
- One Flew Over the Kosovo Theater [Geçtim Ama Tiyatrodan] - Istanbul State Theater (Istanbul) / 2014
- A P ДeПartament - Skampa Theater, Elbasan Albania & City Theater, Ferizaj, Kosovo & Skampa International Theater Festival / 2014
- War in Times of Love (La Guerre au Temps de l'Amour) - GARE AU THÉÂTRE & TERMOS (Paris, France) / 2014
- Peer Gynt from Kosovo - Hessisches Staatstheater Wiesbaden (Wiesbaden, Germany), Teater de Vill (Stockholm, Sweden), Qendra Multimedia (Prishtina, Kosovo) / 2014
- Yue Madeleine Yue (Büyük Şehir) - Aatiyatro & BO SAHNE (Istanbul, Turkey) / 2014
- The Demolition of the Eiffel Tower - Qendra Multimedia (Prishtina, Kosovo) / 2013
- Yue Madeleine Yue – Luzerner Theater - (Luzern, Switzerland) / 2013
- The Hustler – Qendra Multimedia (Prishtina, Kosovo) / 2013
- The Around The Globe Chain Play - Lark Play Development Center / USA 2013 (co-written with: Dominique Morisseau (USA), Bekah Brunstetter (USA), Van Badham (Australia), Mixkaela Villalon (Philippines), Janice Poon (Hong Kong), Abdelrahem Alawji (Lebanon), John Freedman (Russia), Ulrike Syha (Germany), Enver Husicic (Netherlands), Zainabu Jallo (Nigeria), Beatriz Cabur (Spain), Sarah Grochala (UK), Sigtryggur Magnason (Iceland), Noe Morales Munoz (Mexico) and Caridad Svich (USA).

=== 2011–2012 ===
- One Flew Over the Kosovo Theater - 2012 - Qendra Multimedia, Pristina / National Theater of Kosovo, Pristina / National Theater of Albania, Tirana / CTC, Skopje / CZKD, Belgrade
- Yue Madeleine Yue - 2012 - Volkstheater - (Vienna, Austria), Qendra Multimedia (Prishtina, Kosovo)
- The Bridge (Die Brücke) - 2012 - Hessisches Staatstheater Wiesbaden (Wiesbaden, Germany)
- The Demolition of the Eiffel Tower - 2011 - Gerald W. Lynch Theater – (New York, USA)
- The Demolition of the Eiffel Tower –2011 - SARTR Theater - Sarajevo / MESS International Theater Festival – (Sarajevo, Bosnia and Herzegovina)
- Patriotic Hypermarket (co-author) – 2011 - Bitef Theater / Kulturanova/ Qendra Multimedia - (Belgrade and Pristina)

=== 2009–2010 ===
- War in Times of Love – 2010, Yale Drama Coalition (USA)
- The Demolition of the Eiffel Tower - 2010, Fabrique Ephéméride (Paris, France)
- The Odyssey Project - 2010 - (co-author with Sebastien Joanniez (France), Sigtryggur Magnason (Iceland), Joel Horwood (England), Ozen Yula (Turkey), Nikolai Khalezin (Belarus) - The Internationalists - (New York, USA)
- The General of the Dead Army - 2010 - (adaptation of the Ismail Kadare's novel) –Albanian Theatre – (Skopje, Macedonia)
- An American Tune – 2009 - (co-author) National Theatre of Macedonia (Bitola, Macedonia)

=== 2007–2008 ===
- Punch and Judy Murder Love – (co-author) 2008, Theatre of Prizren (Prizren)
- The Bridge – 2008, Children's Theatre Center (Skopje, Macedonia)
- The Bridge – 2007, Qendra Multimedia / CCTD (Pristina)
- Liza is Sleeping – 2007 - National Theatre of Kosovo (Pristina)
- War in Times of Love – 2008 - Nomad Theatre (UK)
- The Last Supper – 2007 - Qendra Multimedia & Markus Zohner Theatre Company, (Pristina / Lugano)
- Madeleine's war – 2007 - Oda Theatre (Pristina)

=== 2005–2006 ===
- Aeneas Wounded – 2006, Qendra Multimedia & 2007 Glej Theatre (Ljubljana, Slovenia)
- The Subversive Donkey – 2006, National Theatre (Gnjilane)
- Speckled Blue Eyes – 2005, Albanian Drama Theatre (Skopje, Macedonia)
- Le Roi, Le Clown, L`homme au Fouet et le Barbier – 2005, Gare au Theatre (Paris, France)
- The Longest Winter, 2005, CCTD & OMPF (Pristina)

=== 2002–2004 ===
- Forbidden Lesson – 2004, CCTD & Dodona Theatre (Pristina)
- Voyage to Unmikistan (co-author) 2002, L`espace d'un instant (Pristina / Paris)
- The Well – 2002, City Theater Gjilan

== Existing translations of his plays ==
- Negotiating Peace - English, German, Czech, Croatian, Italian, Norwegian
- Gadjo - English
- The Handke Project - English, Serbian, Italian, German, French, Slovenian, Czech
- Father and Father - English, Serbian, Turkish
- Audience by Václav Havel - English, German, Persian, Croatian, Serbian, Turkish, Estonian
- The return of Karl May - English, German, Serbian, French, Romanian, Polish
- Swiss Connection - German, French, English
- a.y.l.a.n - English, German, French
- In Five Seasons: An Enemy of the People - English, German, Turkish, French, Serbian
- The Hypocrites or the English Patient - English, German, Turkish
- Wales Gets a King - English, Macedonian
- Sworn Virgin - German, English, Italian, Serbian
- 55 shades of Gay - English, German, Serbian, Hungarian, Macedonian, Slovenian, Polish
- Department of Dreams - English, Turkish, Dutch
- The Internationals - English, Greek, German
- A Play with Four Actors and Some Pigs and Some Cows and Some Horses and a Prime Minister and a Milka Cow and Some Local and International Inspectors - English, German, Croatian, Italian, French, Finnish
- The Windmills - Albanian, German
- Kosovo for Dummies - German, English, Macedonian, Polish
- Bordel Balkan - Montenegrin, English, German, Slovenian, French, Italian, Macedonian, Polish, Swedish
- Peer Gynt from Kosovo - German, English, Serbian, Turkish, Italian, Macedonian, French, Greek
- One Flew over the Kosovo theater - English, Greek, French, German, Serbian, Turkish, Italian, Slovenian, Macedonian
- Yue Madeleine Yue- German, English, Turkish, Croatian, Greek
- The Demolition of the Eiffel Tower - Italian, Bosnian, English, French, German, Turkish, Macedonian, Polish, Czech
- War in Times of Love - English, German, French, Turkish, Bulgarian, Serbian, Polish, Italian, Spanish
- In Paradise Artists can Fly- English
- Aeneas Wounded - Albanian, English, Slovenian, Serbian, Romanian, Turkish
- The Hustler - English, Turkish, German
- “The Bridge” - Albanian, English, German, Bosnian, Turkish
- Patriotic Hypermarket- Albanian, Serbian, English, French
- “The General of the Dead Army” - Serbian, Turkish
- Speckled Blue Eyes - English, Macedonian, Spanish, Turkish
- Liza is Sleeping - English, Bulgarian, Turkish, Kurdish
- Voyage to Unmikistan - Albanian, French
