= Oda Theatre =

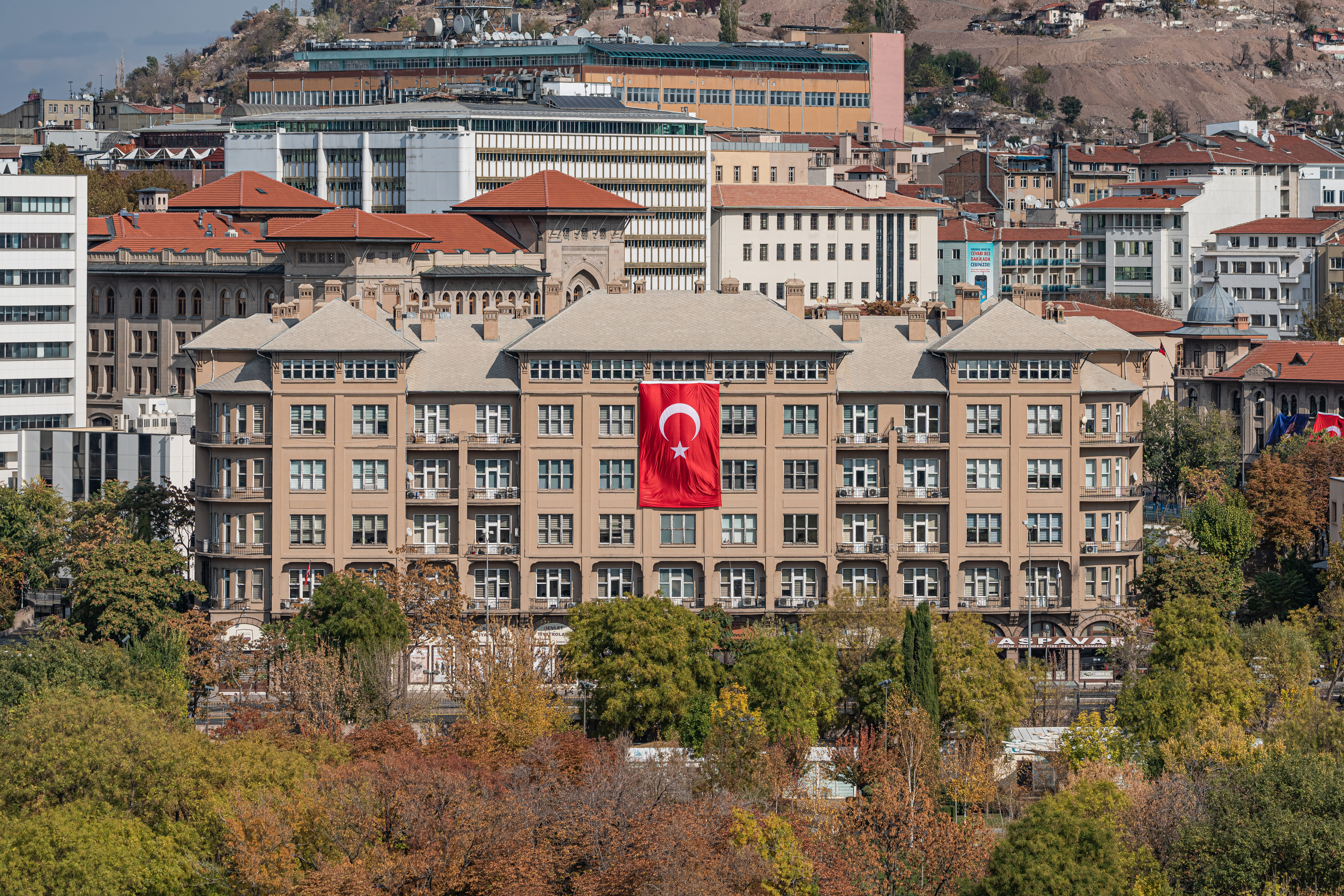
TST head office building

Oda Theatre (Turkish: Oda Tiyatrosu), literally Chamber Theatre, is a theatre in Ulus quarter of Altındağ district in Ankara, Turkey. It is operated by the Turkish State Theatres, and is located in the Evkaf Apartmanı. This is the same building that houses the head office of the Turkish State Theatres. The building also contains the Küçük Theatre. The theatre has opened the works by Turkish playwrights including Pusuda by Cahit Atay.
