= Nurullah Genç =

Turkish poet and novelist

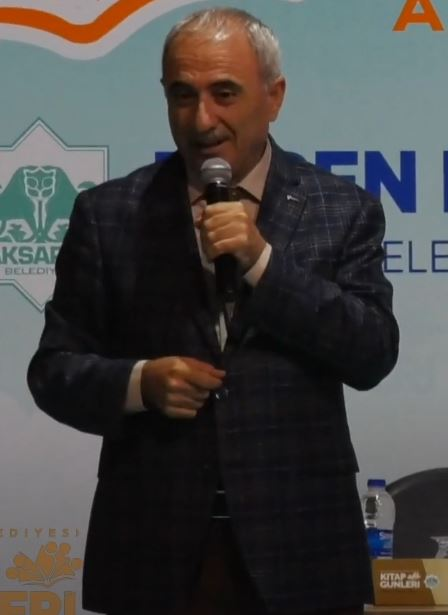
- Born: September 9, 1960; Horasan, Erzurum, Turkey
- Occupations: Author, poet
- Writing career
- Subjects: Poetry, Islam

Nurullah Genç (born September 9, 1960) is a noted Turkish poet and novelist. The Cambridge History of Turkey cites him as a principal Turkish author for the period 1981–1999.

== Poetry books ==
- Çiçekler Üşümesin
- Nuyageva
- Yankı ve Hüzün
- Aşkım İsyandır Benim
- Siyah Gözlerine Beni de Götür
- Yanılgı Saatleri
- Yağmur
- Rüveyda Yıldırım
- Denizin Son Martıları
- Aşk Ölümcül Bir Hülyadır
- Hüznün Lalesidir Dünya
- Gül ve Ben
- Yürüyelim Seninle İstanbul'da
- Müptelâdır Gemiler Benim Denizlerime
- Sensiz Kalan Bu Şehri Yakmayı Çok istedim
- Birkaç Deli Güvercin
- Çanakkale:Her Şey Yanıp Gül Oldu
- Ateş Semazenleri
- Ölüm Noktürnü

== Novels ==
- Tutkular Keder Oldu
- Yollar Dönüşe Gider
- İntizar

== Occupational Books ==
- Zirveye Götüren Yol:Yönetim
- Yönetim El Kitabı
- Başarı Bedel İster
- Yönetim ve Organizasyon
- Kalite Liderliği
- Ortaklık Kültürü
