= Korean Park =

Park in Ankara, Turkey

- Kore Parkı
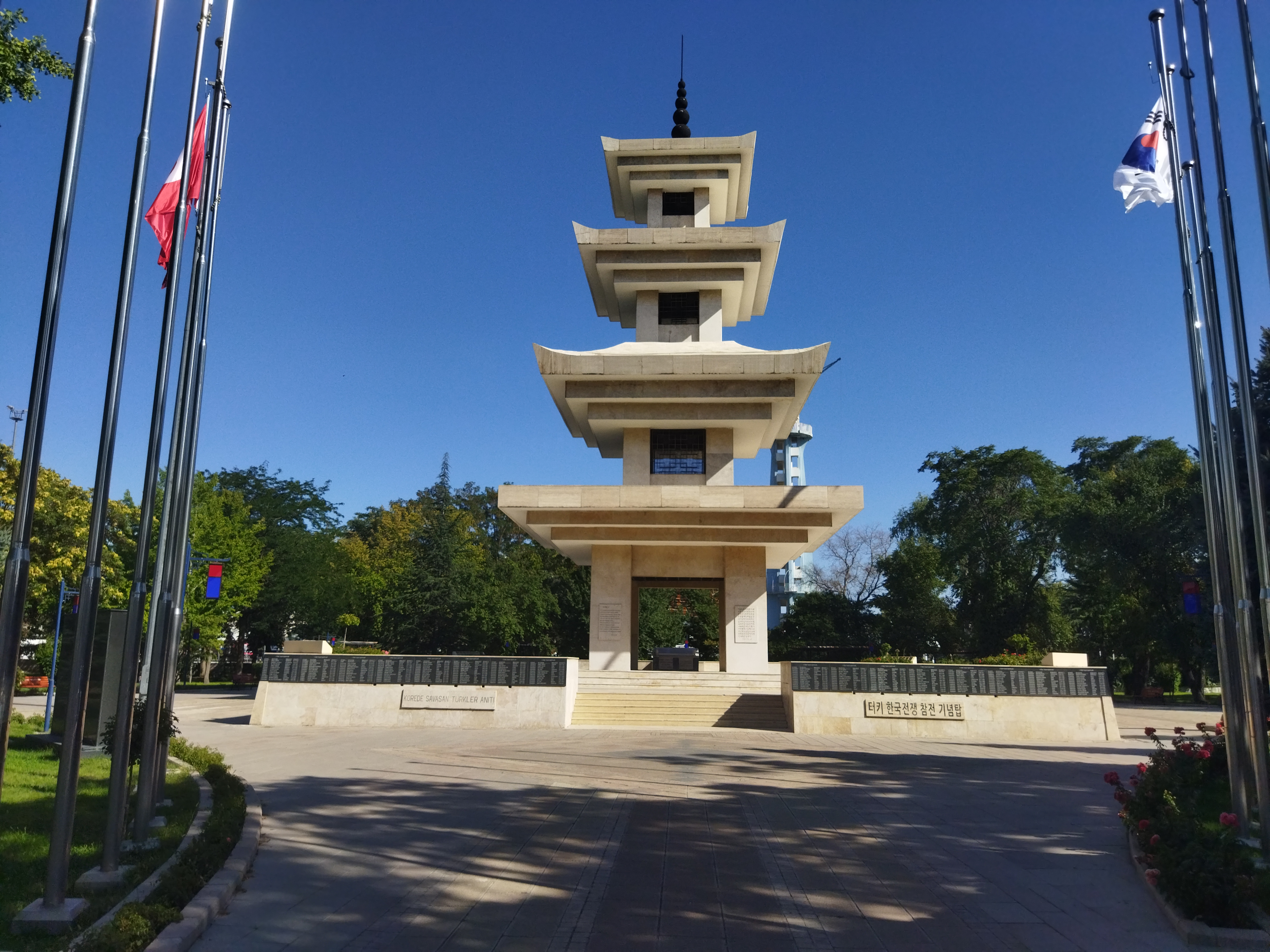
- Interactive map of the Korean Park area

General information
- Location: Ankara, Turkey
- Coordinates: 39°56′20″N 32°50′30″E

Korean Park (Turkish: Kore Parkı) is a park located in Ankara, the capital of Turkey. Within the park stands a memorial tower inscribed with the names of Turkish soldiers who lost their lives during the Korean War, opened in 1973. The monument was renovated in 2010.
