= MEB Şura Salonu =

Concert hall in Ankara, Turkey

Coordinates: 39°56′10″N 32°49′30″E

MEB Şura Salonu also known as Festival Hall is a concert hall in Ankara. It is noted for its tango performances.
