= Athenocles =

Athenocles (Ancient Greek: Ἀθηνοκλῆς) is a name of ancient Greece that may refer to one of several people:

- Athenocles of Athens, possibly fictional Greek leader in certain historical traditions
- Athenocles of Cyzicus (fl. 3rd or 2nd centuries BCE), ancient Greek grammarian
- Athenocles, a celebrated chaser of unknown age, mentioned by Athenaeus in his Deipnosophistae (xi. pp. 781, e., 782, b.)
