= Samsun =

City in northern Turkey

- Metropolitan municipality
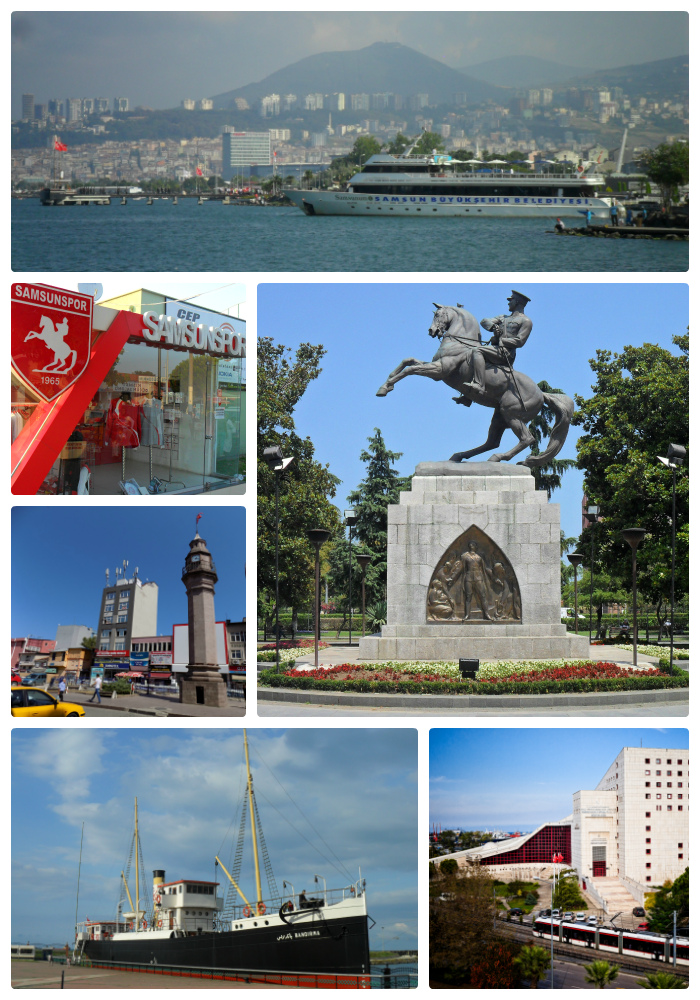
- Clockwise from top right: Samsunum-1 ship and coast, Statue of Honor, Atatürk Culture Centre, Bandırma Ferry and National Struggle Park Open Air Museum, Saathane Square, Store 55

- Emblem of Samsun Metropolitan Municipality

- Location of Samsun within Turkey Samsun (Black Sea)
- Coordinates: 41°17′25″N 36°20′01″E
- Country: Turkey
- Region: Black Sea
- Province: Samsun
- Boroughs: List: Atakum; Canik; İlkadım; Tekkeköy

Government
  - Mayor: Halit Doğan (AK Party)

Area
  - Total: 9,579 km^{2} (3,698 sq mi)
- Elevation: 4 m (13 ft)

Population (2025)
  - Total: 1,392,403
  - Density: 145.4/km^{2} (376.5/sq mi)

GDP (nominal, 2024)
  - Metropolitan municipality: ₺512.982 billion (US$15.646 billion)
  - Per capita: ₺369,415 (US$11,253)
- Time zone: UTC+03:00 (TRT)
- Postal code: 55
- Area code: (+90) 362
- Licence plate: 55
- Climate: Cfa
- Website: www.samsun.bel.tr www.samsun.gov.tr

Samsun is a city on the north coast of Turkey and a major Black Sea port. The urban area recorded a population of 738,692 in 2022. The city is the capital of Samsun Province which has a population of 1,382,376. The city is home to Ondokuz Mayıs University, several hospitals, three large shopping malls, Samsunspor football club, an opera house and a large and modern manufacturing district. The city is best known as the place where Mustafa Kemal Atatürk began the Turkish War of Independence in 1919.

== Name ==
Although Amisos is attested in Greek historical sources, the -ssos / -sos suffix is widely discussed in scholarship as reflecting an Anatolian, especially Luwian, substrate rather than a straightforward Greek derivation.

The present name of the city is believed to have come from its former Greek name of Amisós (Αμισός) by a reinterpretation of eís Amisón (meaning "to Amisós") and ounta (Greek suffix for place names) to [eí]s Am[p]s-únta (Σαμψούντα: Sampsúnta) and then Samsun (pronounced [samsun]).

The early Greek historian Hecataeus wrote that Amisos was formerly called Enete, the place mentioned in Homer's Iliad. In Book II, Homer says that the ἐνετοί (Enetoi) inhabited Paphlagonia on the southern coast of the Black Sea in the time of the Trojan War (c. 1200 BC). The Paphlagonians are listed among the allies of the Trojans in the war, where their king Pylaemenes and his son Harpalion perished. Strabo mentioned that the inhabitants had disappeared by his time.

Samsun has also been known as Peiraieos by Athenian settlers and even briefly as Pompeiopolis by Gnaeus Pompeius Magnus.

The city was called Simisso by the Genoese. It was during the Ottoman Empire, that its present name was written as Ottoman Turkish: صامسون (Ṣāmsūn). The city has been known as Samsun since the formation of the Turkish Republic in 1923.

== History ==
=== Prehistory and foundation ===
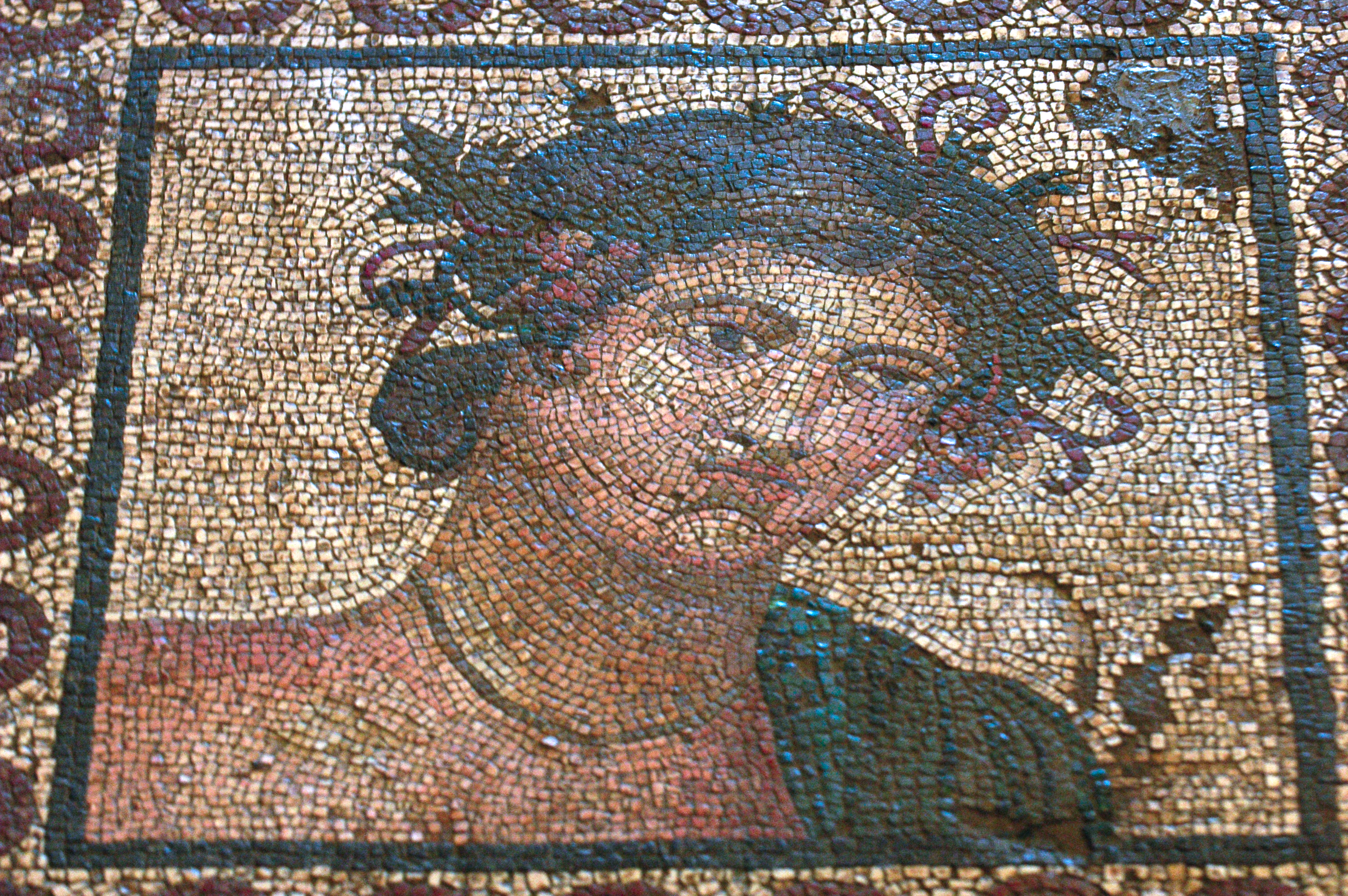
A mosaic in the Samsun Museum

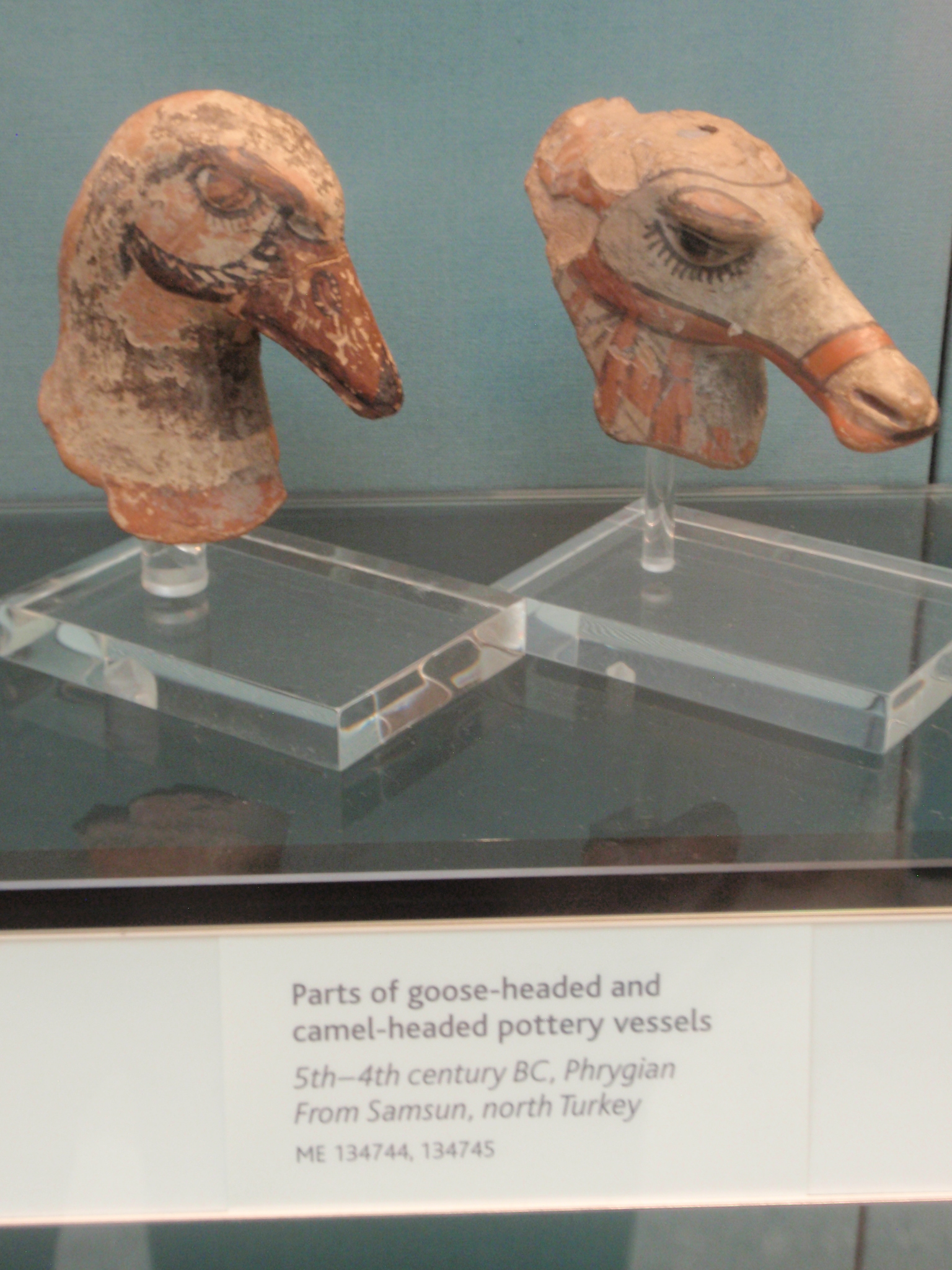
Parts of goose-headed and camel-headed Phrygian pottery vessels

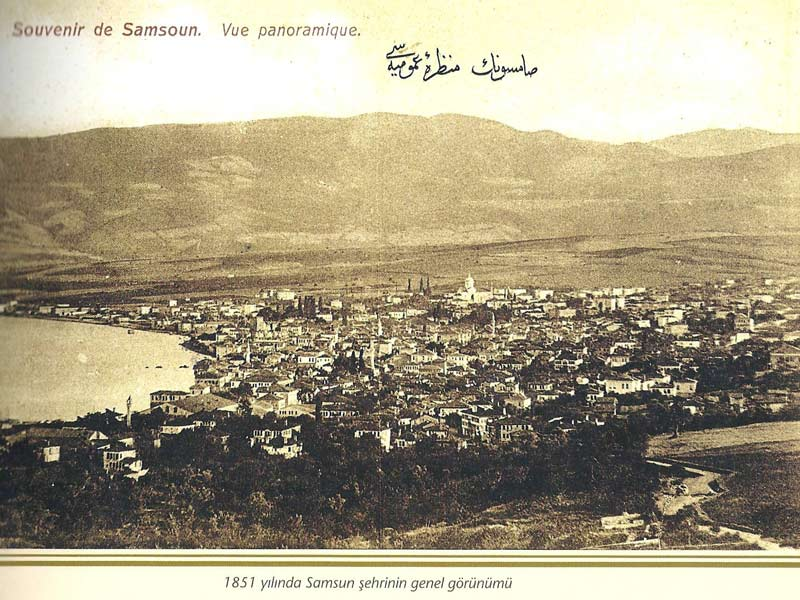
General view of Samsun, circa 1851.

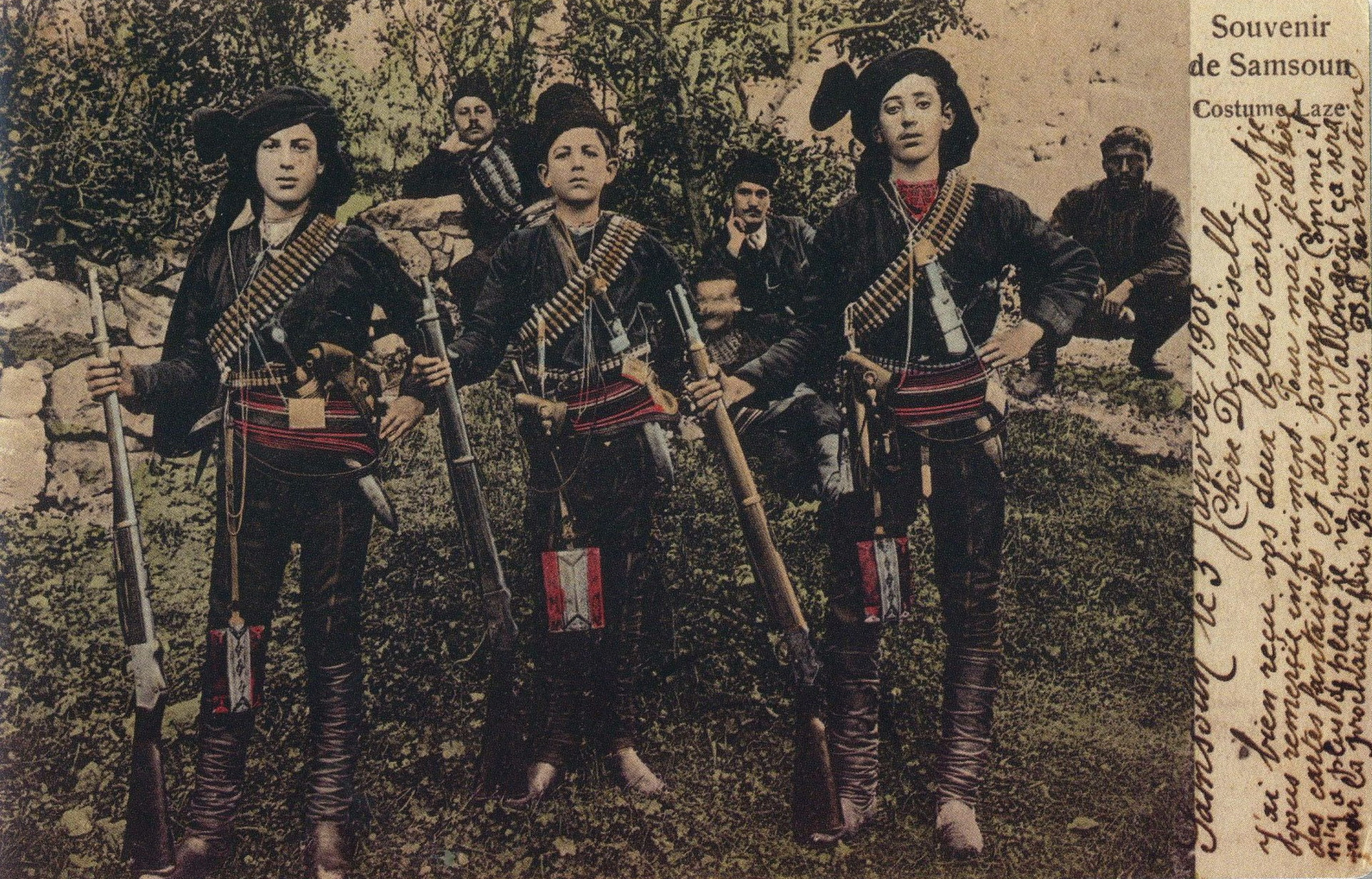
People from Samsun. National costumes in Ottoman era, 1910s

Paleolithic artifacts found in the Tekkeköy Caves can be seen in Samsun Archaeology Museum.

The earliest layer excavated of the höyük of Dündartepe revealed a Chalcolithic settlement. Early Bronze Age and Hittite settlements were also found there and at Tekkeköy.

Samsun (then known as Amisos, Greek Αμισός, alternative spelling Amisus) was settled in about 760–750 BC by Ionians from Miletus, who established a flourishing trade relationship with the ancient peoples of Anatolia. The city's ideal combination of fertile ground and shallow waters attracted numerous traders.

Historical affiliations

Hittites c. 1600–1200 BC
Phrygia c. 800–695 BC
Achaemenid Empire c. 547–333 BC
Macedonian Empire 333–323 BC
Kingdom of Pontus c. 281–63 BC
Roman Empire 63 BC–395 AD
Byzantine Empire 395–1071
Seljuk Empire 1071–1080s
Danishmendids c. 1080–1178
Sultanate of Rum 1178–1243
Ilkhanate 1243–1335
Eretna Beylik 1335–1381
Ottoman Empire c. 1428–1922
Turkey 1923–present

Amisus was settled by the Ionian Milesians in the 6th century BC; it is believed that there was significant Greek activity along the coast of the Black Sea, although the archaeological evidence for this is very fragmentary. The only archaeological evidence we have as early as the 6th century is a fragment of Wild Goat style Greek pottery, in the Louvre.

=== Persian, Classical and Hellenistic Periods ===
The city was captured by the Persians in 550 BC and became part of the satrapy of Cappadocia. In the 5th century BC, Amisus became a free state and one of the members of the Delian League led by the Athenians; it was then renamed Peiraeus under Pericles. A historical tradition from Theopompus by way of Strabo has it that the city was originally colonized by the Greeks by a man named Athenocles. Starting in the 3rd century BC, the city came under the control of Mithridates I, later founder of the Kingdom of Pontus. The Amisos treasure may have belonged to one of the kings.

Tumuli, containing tombs dated between 300 BC and 30 BC, can be seen at Amisos Hill but unfortunately Toraman Tepe was mostly flattened during construction of the 20th century radar base. The artisanal production included Terracotta products in a Greek style.

The economic advantages of Amisos lay primarily in its mineral resources, agricultural production, and inland transportation networks. The city had access to iron resources, probably traded from the Chalybes, while the surrounding countryside was suitable for olive cultivationand the nearby Pontic Mountains yielded some silver.Although Amisos lacked a good natural harbour and was not situated near the mouth of a major river,its geographical location facilitated connections between central Anatolia and the maritime routes of the southern Black Sea.An overland route across the so-called “Isthmus of Asia,”passing through Amaseia, Zela, and Kaisareia, also connected the city with Tarsos. Consequently, the economic foundations of Amisos depended not solely on maritime commerce but also on mineral resources, agricultural production, and land-based trade routes linking the Black Sea coast with the Anatolian interior.

=== Roman Period ===
The Romans conquered Amisus in 71 BC during the Third Mithridatic War. and Amisus became part of Bithynia et Pontus province. Around 46 BC, during the reign of Julius Caesar, Amisus became the capital of Roman Pontus. From the period of the Second Triumvirate up to Nero, Pontus was ruled by several client kings, as well as one client queen, Pythodorida of Pontus, a granddaughter of Marcus Antonius. From 62 CE it was directly ruled by Roman governors, most famously by Trajan's appointee Pliny. Pliny the Younger's address to the Emperor Trajan in the 1st century CE "By your indulgence, sir, they have the benefit of their own laws," is interpreted by John Boyle Orrery to indicate that the freedoms won for those in Pontus by the Romans was not pure freedom and depended on the generosity of the Roman emperor.

The estimated population of the city around 150 AD is between 20,000 and 25,000 people, classifying it as a relatively large city for that time. The city functioned as the commercial capital for the province of Pontus; beating its rival Sinope (now Sinop) due to its position at the head of the trans-Anatolia highway.

In Late Antiquity, the city became part of the Dioecesis Pontica within the eastern Roman Empire; later still it was part of the Armeniac Theme.

Samsun Castle was built on the seaside in 1192; it was demolished between 1909 and 1918.

=== Early Christianity ===
With its ancient Hellenic roots, that date back to its founding during the period of Greek colonisation, Samsun subsequently became the center of an early Christian congregation. Its function as a commercial metropolis in northern Asia Minor was a contributing factor to enable the spread of Christian influence. As a large port city – the commercial capital of Pontus – travel to and from Christian hotbeds like Jerusalem was not uncommon. According to Josephus, there was a large Jewish diaspora in Asia Minor. Early Christian missionary work focused on Jewish diaspora communities, and given that the Jewish community in Amisus was a geographically accessible group with a mixed heritage, Amisus was an appealing site for missionary activities. The author of 1 Peter 1:1 addresses the Jewish diaspora of the province of Pontus, along with four other provinces: "Peter, an apostle of Jesus Christ, To God's elect, exiles scattered throughout the provinces of Pontus, Galatia, Cappadocia, Asia and Bithynia." (Peter 1:1) As Amisus would have been the largest commercial port-city in the province, it is believed certain that the spread of Christianity in the region would have begun there. In the 1st century Pliny the Younger documents accounts of Christians in and around the cities of Pontus. His accounts center on his conflicts with the Christians when he served under the Emperor Trajan and describe early Christian communities, his condemnation of their refusal to renounce their religion, but also describes his tolerance for some Christian practices like Christian charitable societies. Many great early Christian figures had connections to Amisus, including Caesarea Mazaca, Gregory the Illuminator (raised as a Christian from 257 CE when he was brought to Amisus) and Basil the Great (Bishop of the city 330–379 CE).

Christian bishops of Amisus include Antonius, who took part in the Council of Chalcedon in 451; Erythraeus, a signatory of the letter that the bishops of Helenopontus wrote to Emperor Leo I the Thracian after the killing of Patriarch Proterius of Alexandria; the late 6th-century bishop Florus, venerated as a saint in the Greek menologion; and Tiberius, who attended the Third Council of Constantinople (680), Leo, the Second Council of Nicaea (787), and Basilius, the Council of Constantinople of 879. The diocese is no longer mentioned in the Greek Notitiae Episcopatuum after the 15th century and thereafter the city was considered part of the see of Amasea. However, some Greek bishops of the 18th and 19th centuries bore the title of Amisus as titular bishops. In the 13th century the Franciscans had a convent at Amisus, which became a Latin bishopric some time before 1345, when its bishop Paulus was transferred to the recently conquered city of Smyrna and was replaced by the Dominican Benedict, who was followed by an Italian Armenian called Thomas. No longer a residential diocese, it is today listed by the Catholic Church as a titular see.

=== Medieval history ===
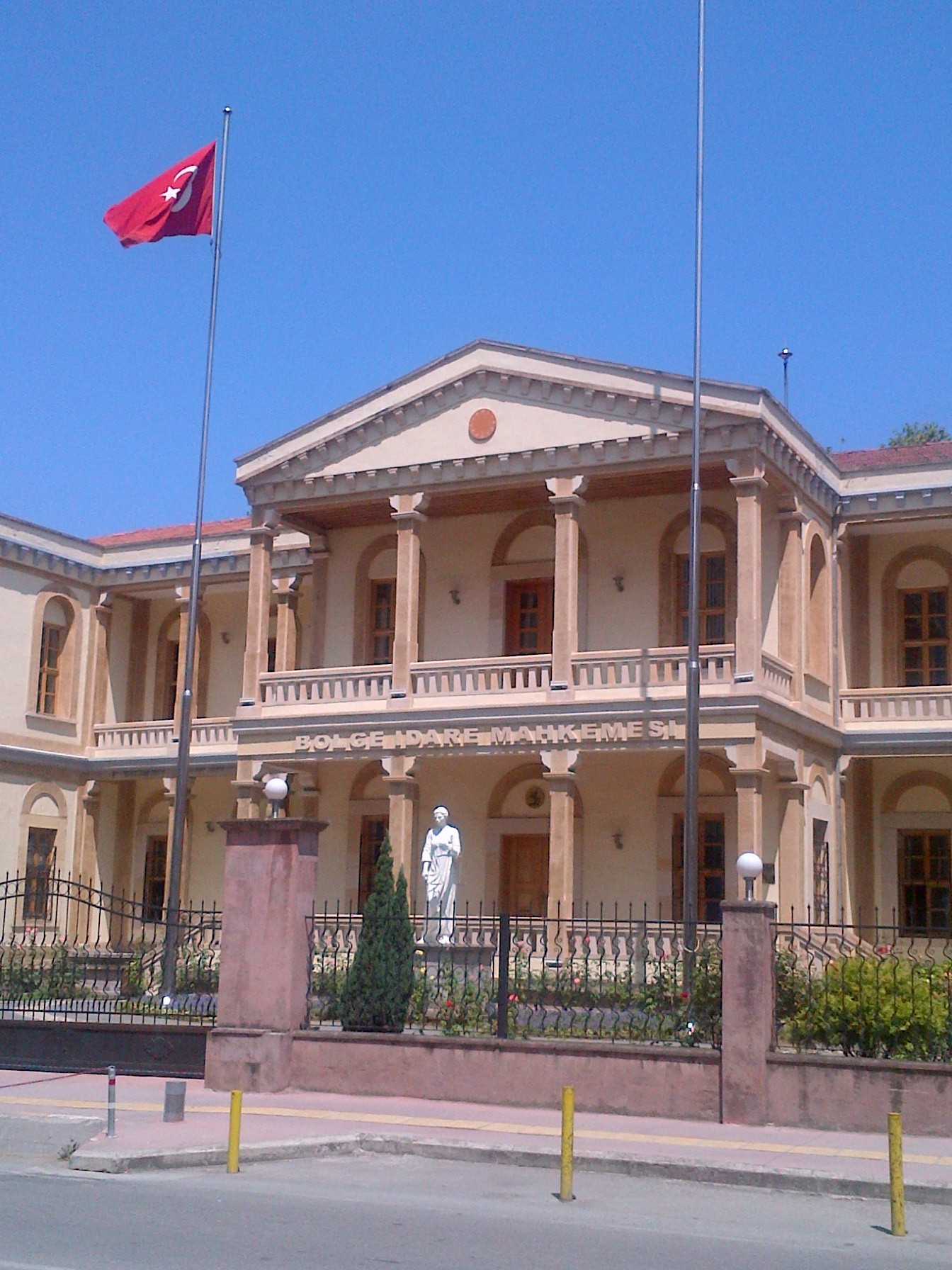
The Governor's House ("Vali Konağı") in Samsun, Turkey

Samsun was part of the Seljuk Empire, the Sultanate of Rum, the Empire of Trebizond, and was one of the Genoese colonies. After the breakup of the Seljuk Empire into small principalities (beyliks) in the late 13th century, the city was ruled by one of them, the Isfendiyarids. It was captured from the Isfendiyarids at the end of the 14th century by the rival Ottoman beylik (later the Ottoman Empire) under sultan Bayezid I, but was lost again shortly afterwards.

The Ottomans permanently conquered the town in the weeks following 11 August 1420.

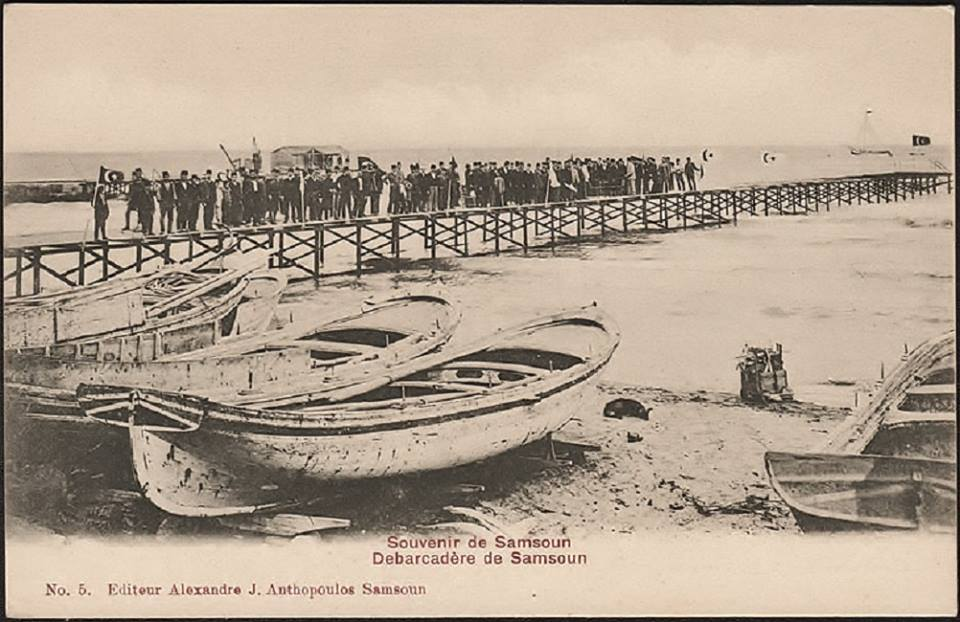
A photograph of a customs and passenger pier from 1900.

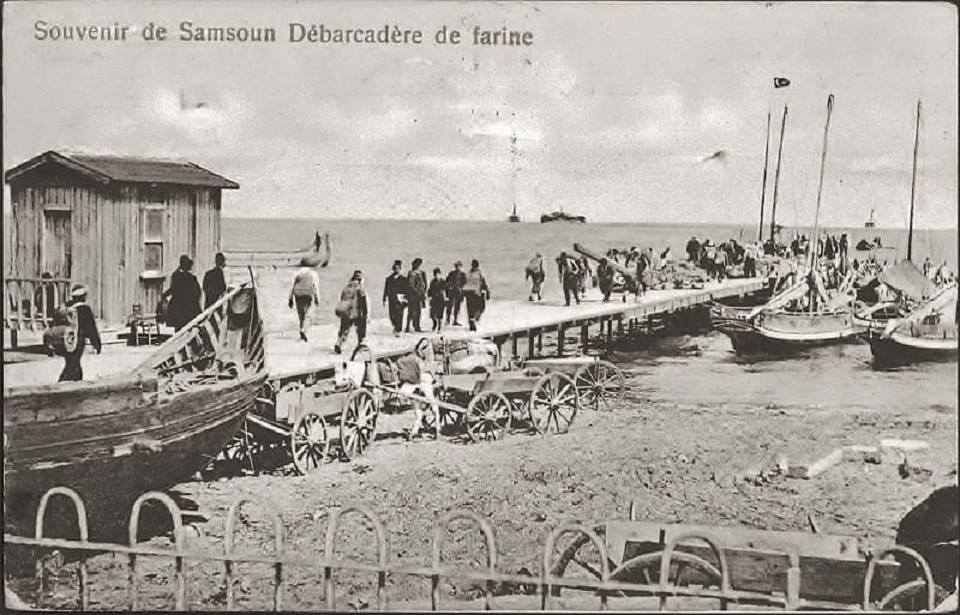
A photograph from the 1900s of a passenger and cargo pier.

In the later Ottoman period, it became part of the Sanjak of Canik (Turkish: Canik Sancağı), which was at first part of the Rûm Eyalet. The land around the town mainly produced tobacco, with its own type being grown in Samsun, the Samsun-Bafra, which the British described as having "small but very aromatic leaves", and commanding a "high price." The town was connected to the railway system in the second half of the 19th century, and tobacco trade boomed. There was a British consulate in the town from 1837 to 1863.

=== Modern history ===
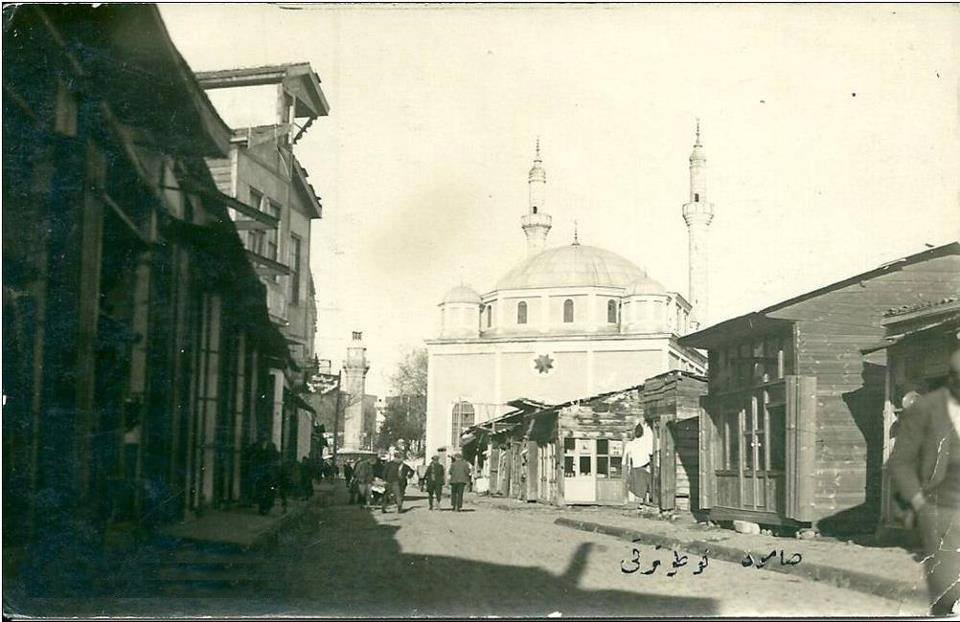
A view of the Grand Mosque and Samsun Clock Tower from the street now known as Bankalar Street, 1920s

Mustafa Kemal Atatürk established the Turkish national movement against the Allies in Samsun on May 19, 1919, the date which traditionally marks the beginning of the Turkish War of Independence. Atatürk, appointed by the Ottoman government as Inspector of the Ninth Army Troops Inspectorate of the Empire in eastern Anatolia, left Constantinople aboard the now-famous SS Bandırma on May 16 for Samsun. Instead of obeying the orders of the Ottoman government, then under the control of the occupying Allies, he and a number of colleagues declared the beginning of the Turkish national movement. The Allies claimed that the Greek population of Samsun was subject looting by Turkish irregular groups, as noted by representatives of the American Near East Relief, an Allied organization. The Turkish National Movement became alarmed due to the presence of Greek warships in the vicinity of Samsun and undertook the deportation which entailed the deportation of 21,000 local Greeks to the interior of Anatolia. By 1920, Samsun's population totaled about 36,000, though this figure declined due to the impacts of war and deportations.

Later, in early June 1922, the city was bombarded by the Allied navy, consisting of American and Greek warships. The Allied bombardment against the Turks was a strategic failure. Following Turkey's victory, the Greek population left for Greece after the 1923 Population Exchange founding villages including Nea Sampsounda in Preveza, Greece.

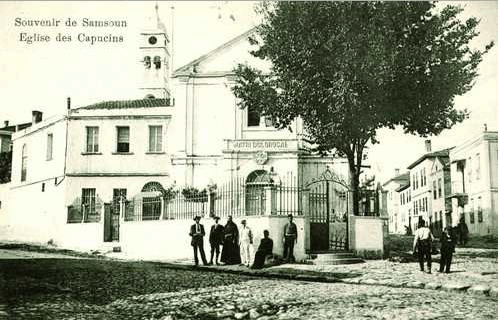
A photograph of the Mater Dolorosa Catholic Church from the Ottoman period

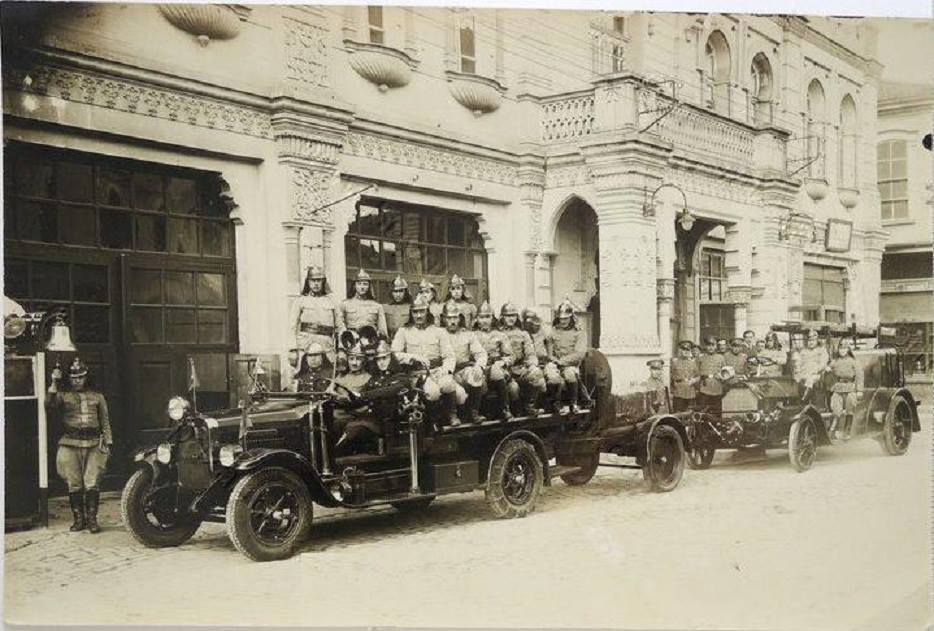
Samsun Fire Department Headquarters 1920s.

After the establishment of the Republic, Samsun was declared a province with five districts Bafra, Çarşamba, Havza, Terme and Vezirköprü. Samsun added additional districts in later years. In 1928, Ladik was established as a district. In 1934, district was Kavak was established followed by Alaçam in 1944 which brought the number of districts in Samsun Province to eight. With the law number 3392 adopted on 19 June 1983 Salıpazarı, Asarcık, Ondokuzmayıs and Tekkeköy districts were established. With the law number 3644 adopted on 9 May 1990, Ayvacık and Yakakent two more districts were established. Samsun entered into a period of economic and population recovery in the years after the establishment of the Republic and quickly restored its status as a vital Black Sea port for Turkey.

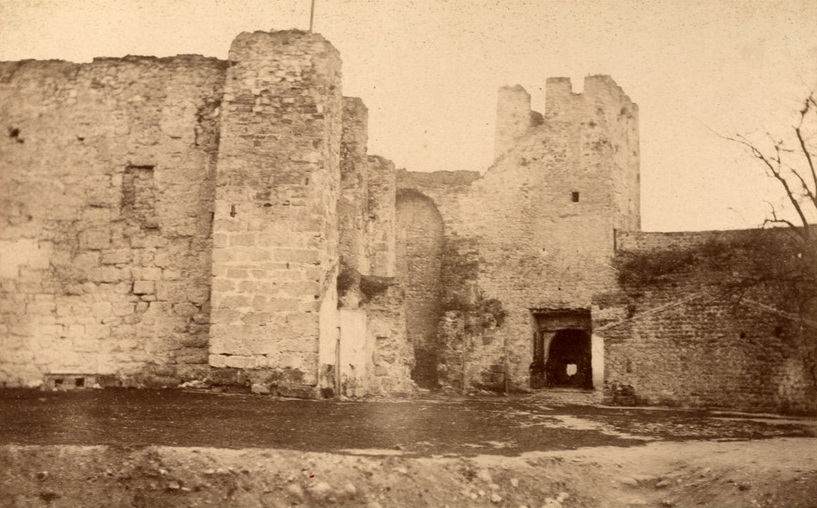
The only photograph of Samsun Castle. It is registered in the archives of the Istanbul University Library and Documentation Department.

Reconstruction of Samsun began quickly after the establishment of the Republic of Turkey. In 1929, the region's first electric power plant began operations. Railway access to the city was established in the early 1950s with service to Sivas and Ankara. Major investments in the regions road network were made beginning in the 1960s. In 1975, per law No. 1873, Ondokuz Mayıs University was established in neighboring Atakum. The construction of the university was a major development to the region, bringing a highly regarded and well-funded educational institution and state hospital to Samsun. The region was connect by air in 1998 with the construction of Samsun-Çarşamba Airport 23 km east of the city center. The airport is primarily serviced by Turkish Airlines with service to Istanbul Airport and Ankara Esenboğa Airport but also has international service to Germany and Iraq. In 2008, the Metropolitan Municipality opened the 36.5 km Samsun Tram network which connects Ondokuz Mayıs University to Samsun 19 Mayıs Stadium.

In 1993, Samsun was established as a metropolitan municipality by decree of the national government in Ankara. The decree further enhanced Samsun's status as one of Turkey's largest and most important cities. As Samsun grew, as did its environs. Neighboring Atakum, a suburb to the west of the city center was established in 2008 with the merger of Atakent, Kurupelit, Altınkum, Çatalçam and Taflan towns into one municipality. Atakum in recent years has become a bedroom community to Samsun and home to much of the region's professional class.

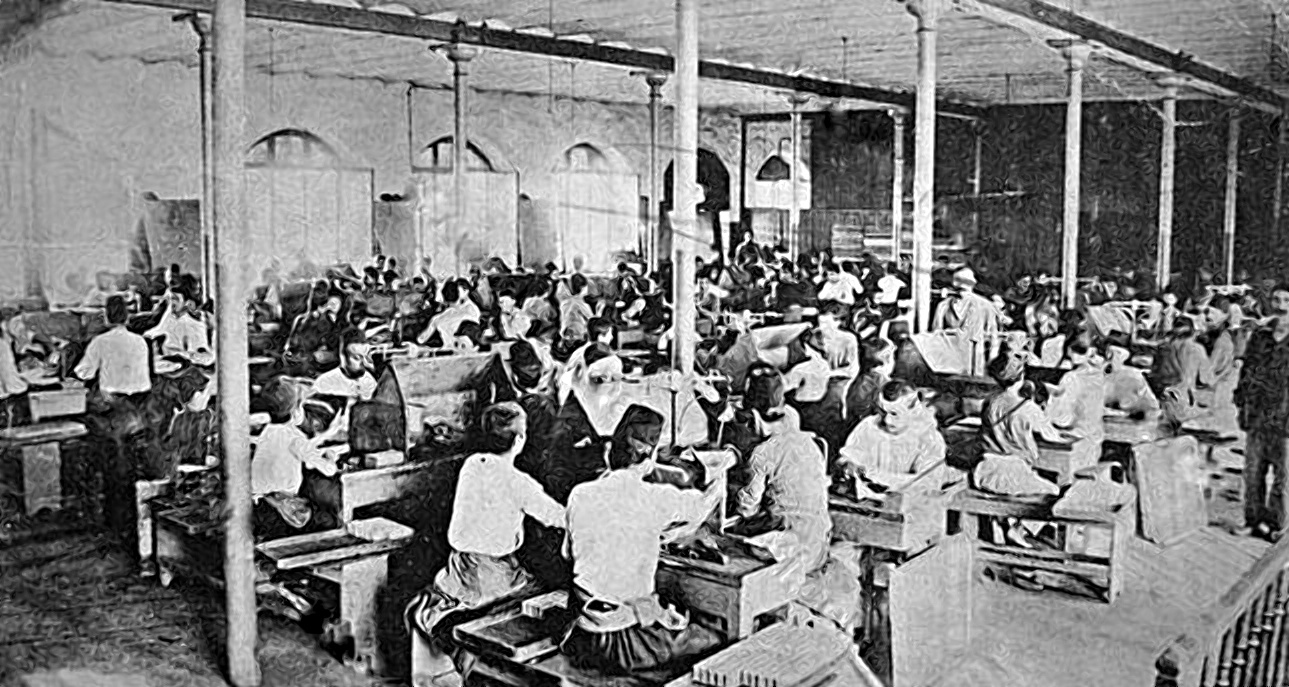
Workers at the Samsun Tobacco Factory in the early 20th century.

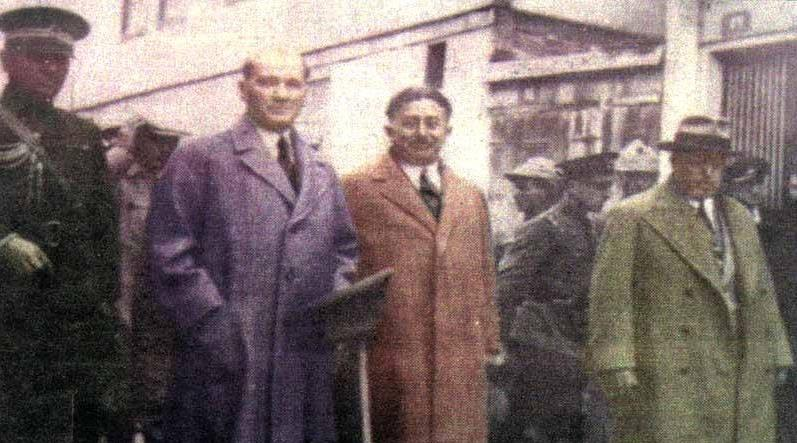
A photograph from Mustafa Kemal Atatürk's visit to Samsun in 1928. The location is in front of what is now the Bafra Business Center

Multiple other large developments have further established Samsun as a major urban center. In 2013, Piazza Samsun a 160 store shopping mall, the largest in the Central Black Sea region, opened in the city center. The opening of the mall was followed by the construction of 115 m tall Sheraton Hotel Samsun. Now the second tallest building in the region, the hotel at the time was the first building in Samsun's history to stand more than 100 m. In 2017, Samsunspor opened a new 30,000 person stadium in Tekkeköy. Gökdelen Towers is now the tallest building in the Samsun region and representative of a recent trend towards high-rise residential housing.

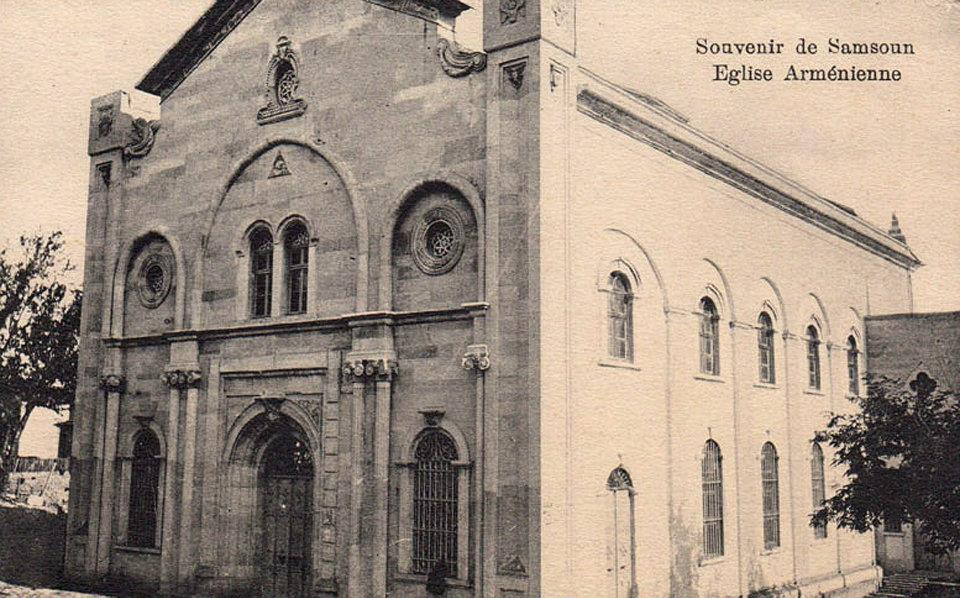
The Canik Surp Nigoğayos Armenian Church

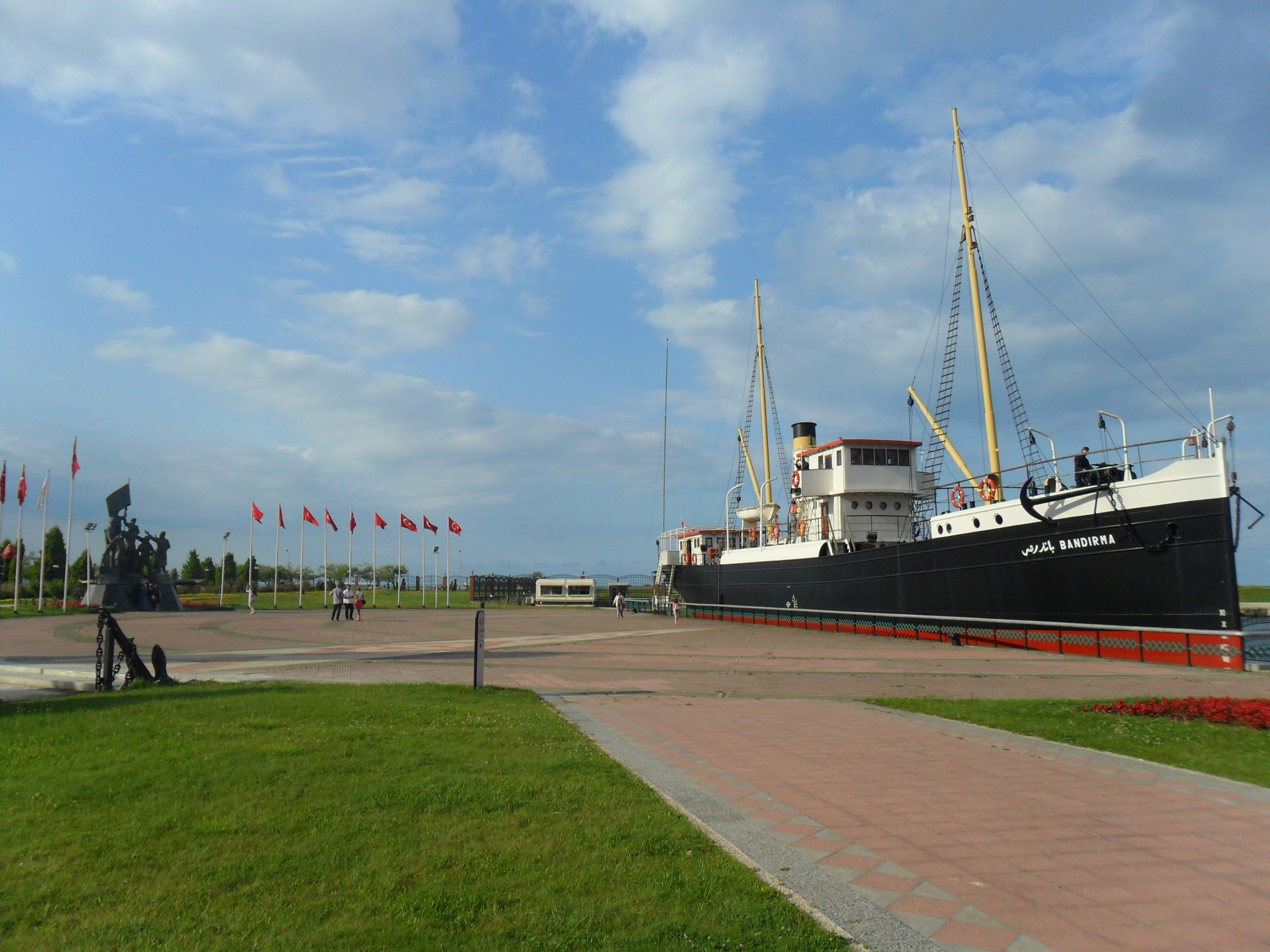
Replica of the cargo ship SS Bandırma, which carried Atatürk from Istanbul and arrived in Samsun on 19 May 1919, the date which traditionally marks the beginning of the Turkish War of Independence

Under the leadership of Metropolitan Mayor Mustafa Demir, the Samsun regional government has undertaken several major transportation and housing development projects in the city center. Projects include the restoration of the Mert River, the construction of the new National Garden, the restoration of Tarihi Şifa Hamamı and the construction of Samsun Saathane Square.

== Geography ==
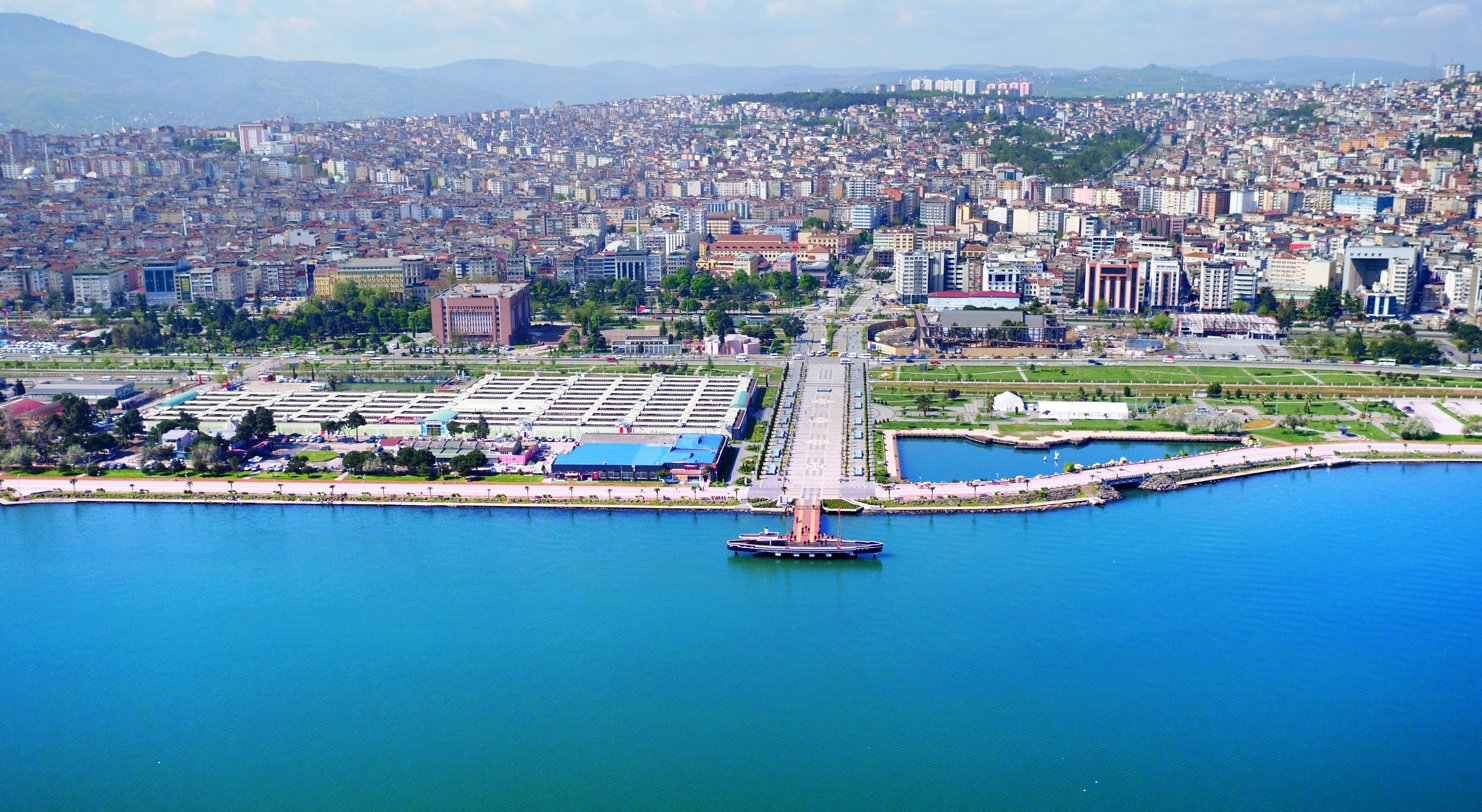
Samsun seen from the sea

Samsun is a long city which extends along the coast between two river deltas which jut into the Black Sea. It is located at the end of an ancient route from Cappadocia: the Amisos of antiquity lay on the headland northwest of the modern city center.

The city is growing fast: land has been reclaimed from the sea and many more apartment blocks and shopping malls are currently being built. Industry is tending to move (or be moved) east, further away from the city center and towards the airport.

=== Rivers ===
To Samsun's west, lies the Kızılırmak ("Red River", the Halys of antiquity), one of the longest rivers in Anatolia and its fertile delta. To the east, lie the Yeşilırmak ("Green River", the Iris of antiquity) and its delta. The River Mert reaches the sea at the city.

=== Climate ===
Samsun has a humid subtropical climate (Köppen: Cfa, Trewartha: Cf), typical for the region, but Samsun is nevertheless drier during summer and milder during winter than most of the southern Black Sea coast.

Summers are warm, the average maximum temperature is around 27 °C (81 °F) in August. Winters are cool to mild and wet, the lowest average minimum temperature is around 4 °C (39 °F) in January.

Precipitation is heaviest in late autumn and early winter. Snow sometimes occurs between the months of December and March, but temperatures below the freezing point rarely last more than a couple of days.

The water temperature is generally mild, fluctuating between 8–20 °C (46–68 °F) throughout the year.

Climate data for Samsun (1991–2020, extremes 1929–2023)
Month	Jan	Feb	Mar	Apr	May	Jun	Jul	Aug	Sep	Oct	Nov	Dec	Year
Record high °C (°F)	24.2 (75.6)	26.5 (79.7)	33.6 (92.5)	37.0 (98.6)	37.4 (99.3)	37.4 (99.3)	37.5 (99.5)	39.0 (102.2)	38.7 (101.7)	38.4 (101.1)	32.4 (90.3)	28.9 (84.0)	39.0 (102.2)
Mean daily maximum °C (°F)	11.1 (52.0)	11.3 (52.3)	12.8 (55.0)	15.3 (59.5)	19.4 (66.9)	24.4 (75.9)	27.4 (81.3)	28.2 (82.8)	24.8 (76.6)	20.8 (69.4)	16.7 (62.1)	13.1 (55.6)	18.8 (65.8)
Daily mean °C (°F)	7.5 (45.5)	7.3 (45.1)	8.7 (47.7)	11.3 (52.3)	15.9 (60.6)	20.8 (69.4)	23.9 (75.0)	24.5 (76.1)	20.9 (69.6)	17.0 (62.6)	12.6 (54.7)	9.4 (48.9)	15.0 (59.0)
Mean daily minimum °C (°F)	4.4 (39.9)	4.1 (39.4)	5.2 (41.4)	7.9 (46.2)	12.4 (54.3)	17.0 (62.6)	20.0 (68.0)	20.7 (69.3)	17.3 (63.1)	13.6 (56.5)	9.1 (48.4)	6.5 (43.7)	11.5 (52.7)
Record low °C (°F)	−8.1 (17.4)	−9.8 (14.4)	−7.0 (19.4)	−2.4 (27.7)	2.7 (36.9)	7.8 (46.0)	13.4 (56.1)	12.4 (54.3)	6.8 (44.2)	1.5 (34.7)	−2.8 (27.0)	−5.0 (23.0)	−9.8 (14.4)
Average precipitation mm (inches)	72.5 (2.85)	53.5 (2.11)	68.5 (2.70)	54.0 (2.13)	54.1 (2.13)	51.6 (2.03)	38.9 (1.53)	47.2 (1.86)	51.8 (2.04)	79.0 (3.11)	76.1 (3.00)	82.5 (3.25)	729.7 (28.73)
Average precipitation days	14.7	13.9	15.97	14.13	12.63	10.43	6.03	6.53	10.43	13.07	11.73	13.87	143.4
Average relative humidity (%)	65.9	67.8	72.5	76.8	78.0	74.0	71.2	70.9	72.2	73.6	67.8	64.4	71.2
Mean monthly sunshine hours	84.1	94.6	118.4	160.5	201.8	248.8	277.3	264.6	199.6	147.2	118.6	90.9	2,006.4
Mean daily sunshine hours	2.8	3.4	3.9	5.4	6.5	8.3	9.0	8.5	6.7	4.8	4.0	2.9	5.5
Source 1: Turkish State Meteorological Service (extremes)
Source 2: NOAA (humidity, sun 1991–2020)

== Demographics ==
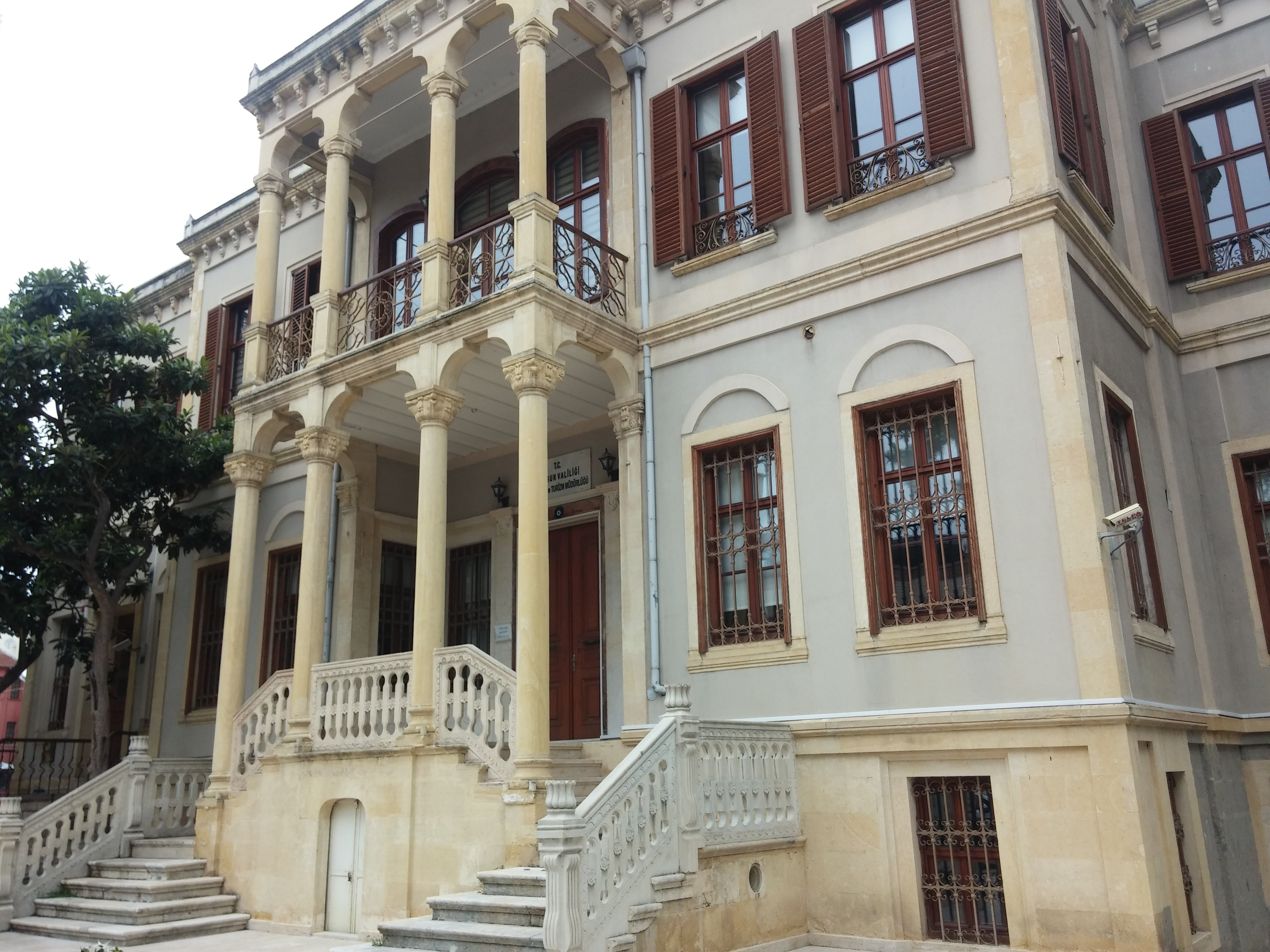
Historical building of the Culture and Tourism Directorate

During the Tanzimat period and the subsequent wars, Ottoman Muslims were exiled from the Balkans and Circassians were expelled from the Caucasus region. Many of the present inhabitants trace their origins from further west or east on the Black Sea coast. The overwhelming majority of people are Muslim. Due to depressed economic conditions, Samsun saw slow but gradual population growth until 1990. Beginning with the economic liberalization Turkey, the city's population began to rapidly increase. In 1990, the city reported a population of 322,982. That figure grew to 388,509 by 2000, 461,640 in 2008, to 511,601 in 2015. In 2020, the city had an estimated population of 710,000.

== Government ==
Samsun holds an important historical role in the political development of the Republic of Turkey. The city is where the first branch of the Free Republican Party and the first provincial branch of the Democrat Party were opened. For that reason, the city occupies an important place in the history of politics in Turkey. Samsun has traditionally voted for right-wing and nationalistic parties both in local and national elections. In this respect, in Samsun, which is described as the "vote depot of the right". Until the 2018, nearly 80% of the populace voted for right-wing parties while the membership rate to political parties is around 20%. The majority of the deputies have been from the right in all general elections since 1950. Only in 1989 and 1994 did a candidate from a left-wing party, Muzaffer Önder was elected mayor.

The city's political view has been changed dramatically at 2002 general elections. The city was governed by Republican People's Party for long years, but Justice and Development Party took it at 2002 elections and did not lose at this city since then.

Today, 6 of the 9 deputies of Samsun's delegation to the Turkish Grand National Assembly are members of right-wing parties with the exception of those from Atakum. The mayor of the Metropolitan Municipality Mustafa Demir is a member of the Justice and Development Party. Of the members of parliament from Samsun, Ahmet Demircan, Yusuf Ziya Yılmaz, Çiğdem Karaaslan, Fuat Köktaş and Orhan Kırcalı are from the Justice and Development Party, while two are from the Republican People's Party, one from Good Party and one from the Nationalist Movement Party.

=== Districts ===
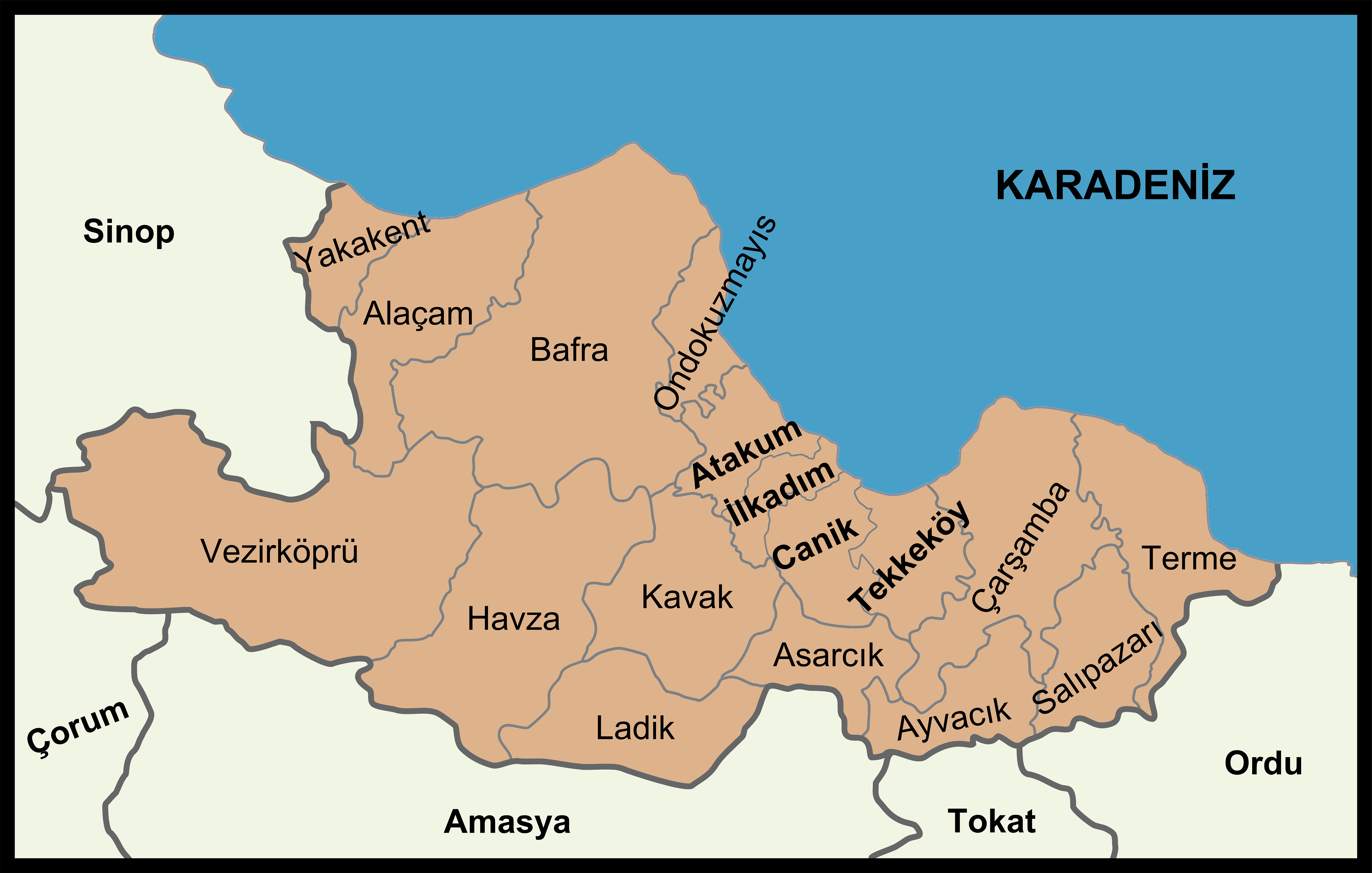
Districts of Samsun (clickable map)

Samsun province is divided into 17 districts.

- 19 Mayıs
- Alaçam
- Asarcık
- Atakum
- Ayvacık
- Bafra
- Canik
- Çarşamba
- Havza
- İlkadım
- Kavak
- Ladik
- Salıpazarı
- Tekkeköy
- Terme
- Vezirköprü
- Yakakent

=== Pollution ===
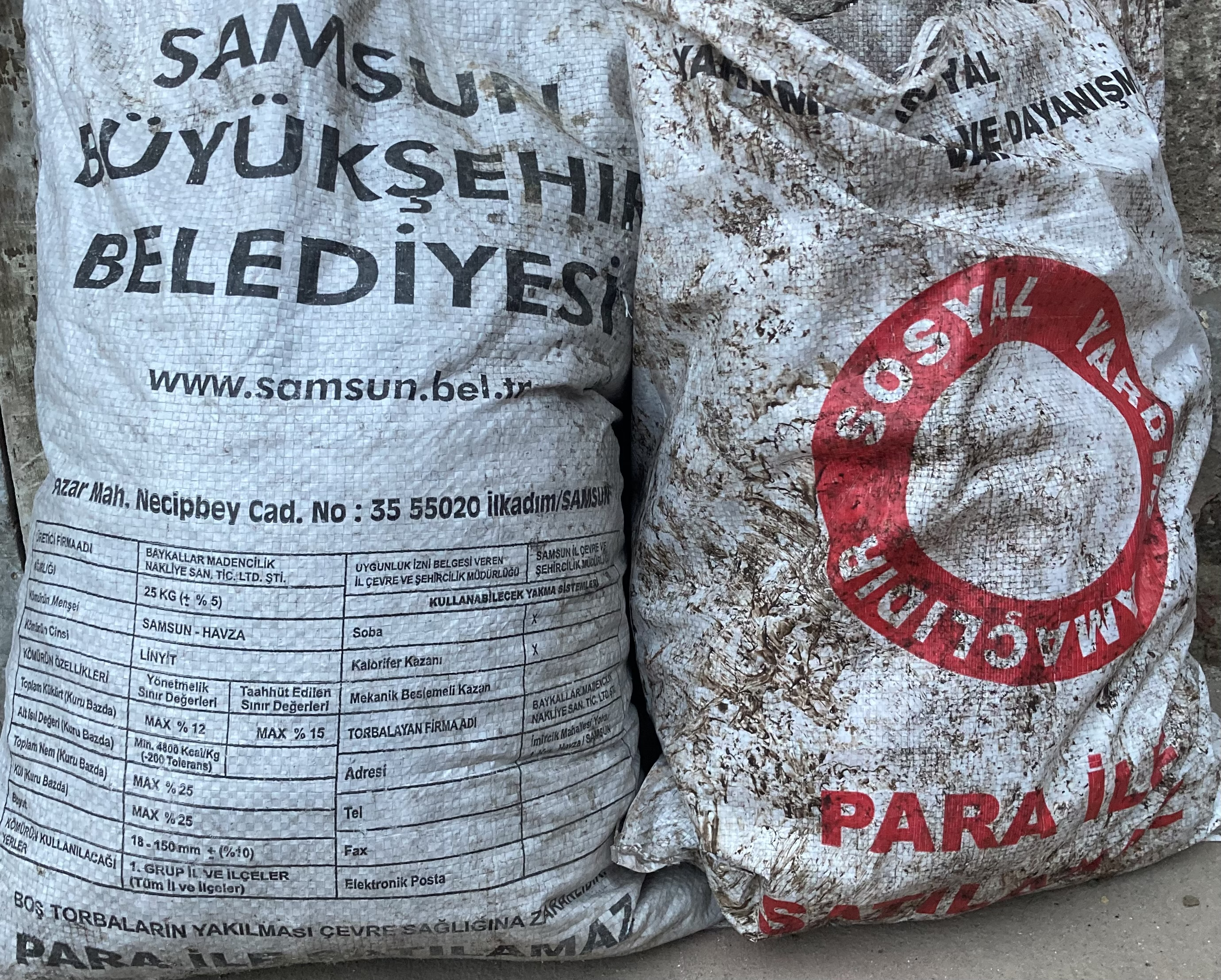
Lignite supplied free by the city council and central government in 2024

Air pollution is a problem in some parts of the city, especially in winter when free coal is supplied to poor families by the government. NOx levels from traffic on Yüzüncüyıl Boulevard are among the highest in the country.

== Architecture ==
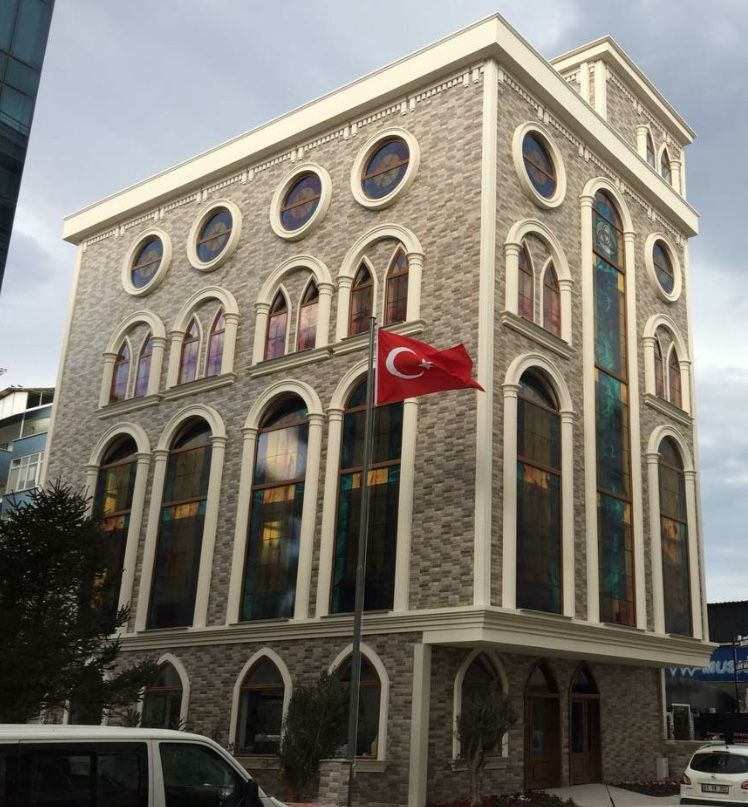
Samsun Protestant Church

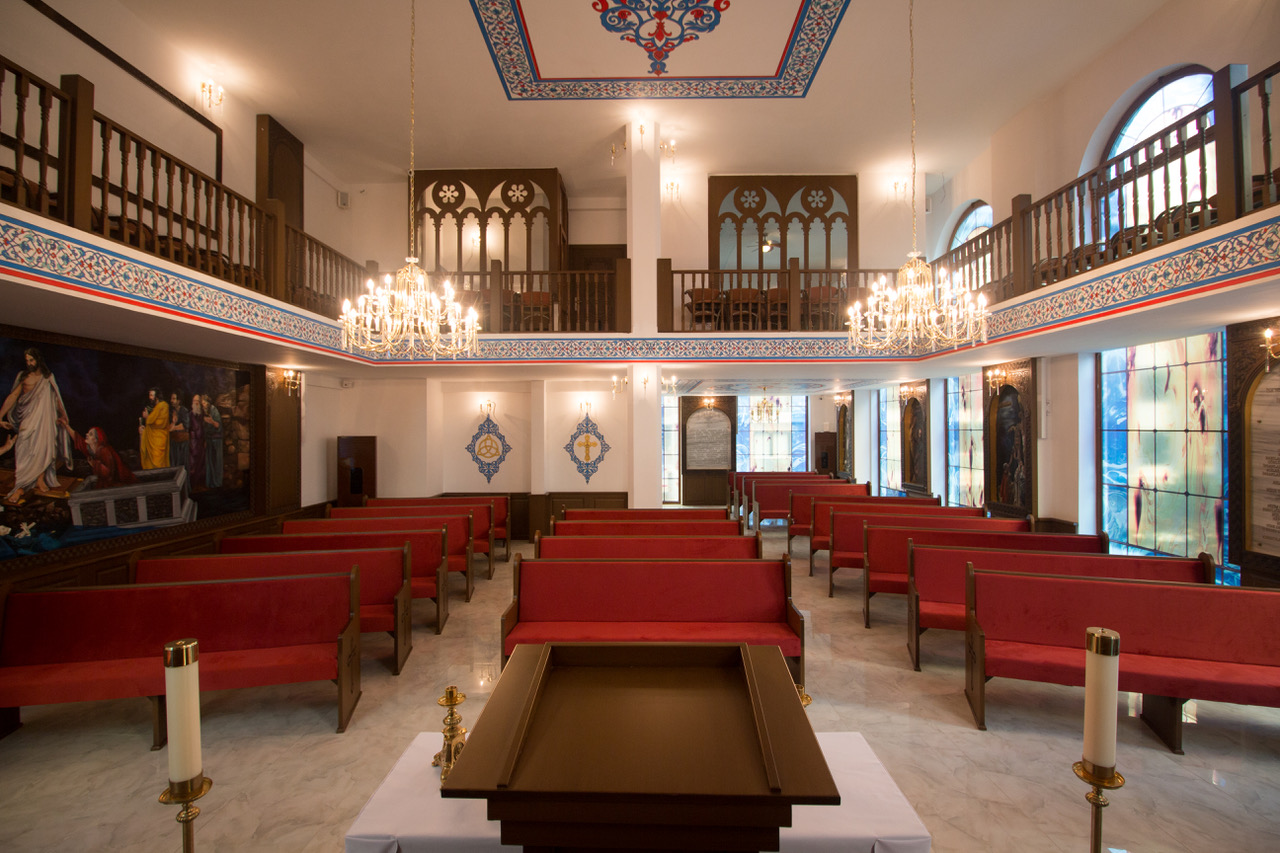
Interior of the Protestant Church in Samsun

Samsun like many Ottoman Empire cities was composed of stone mosques, baths, markets and government buildings while the residential vernacular was almost exclusively wood. The city was populated with wooden konak style homes with more elaborate yalı style homes for the wealthy. Beginning in the 1950s as the city's population grew many of these older wooden structures burned down or torn down and replaced with concrete frame apartment buildings which are now the predominant form of construction in the city center. The city's explosive population growth outpaced its ability to formally build housing for its new residents leading to the construction of vast areas of gecekondu on the city's suburban periphery. As the region has modernized, the Turkish government has made a full force effort to replace gecekondu with formally designed and built housing. TOKİ, the state agency tasked with housing development has invested heavily in Samsun, building several large social housing developments for the city's growing population.

=== Mosques ===
- Pazar Mosque, Samsun's oldest surviving building, a mosque built by the Ilkhanate Mongols in the 13th century.
- Central Great Mosque (Samsun) was built by Batumlu Hacı Efendi in 1884. Its name "Valide" comes from the mother of Ottoman Sultan Abdulaziz.
- Hacı Hatun Mosque dates from 1694.

=== Churches ===
- Samsun Protestant Church – located in Atakum
- Mater Dolorasa Church – located in Ilkadim

Samsun used to have several Greek Orthodox churches however most were destroyed or converted to mosques following the Turkish War of Independence.

== Public squares and parks ==
- Republic Square (Samsun)
- Samsun Saathane Square
- Anit Park

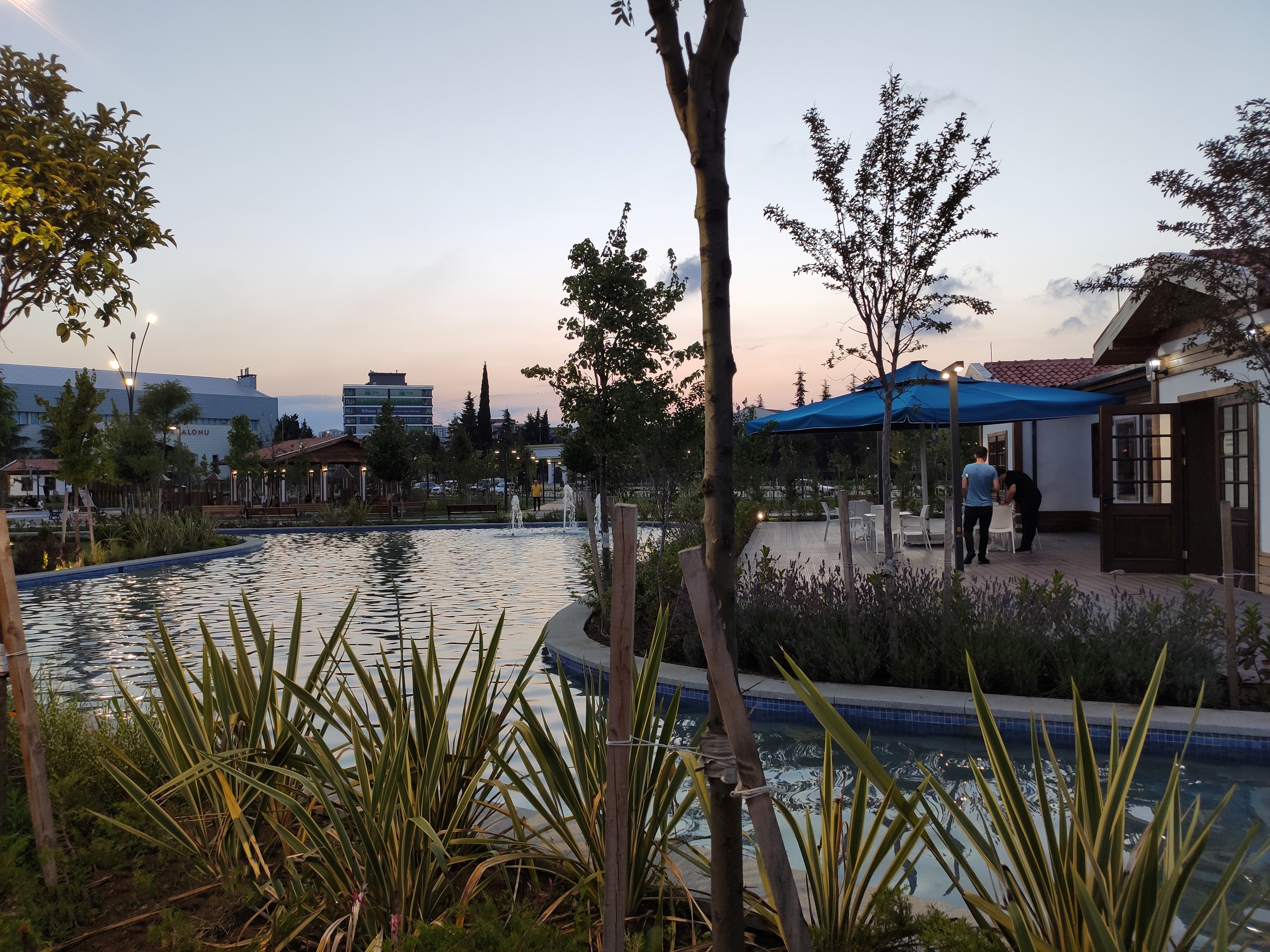
Millet Park in Samsun

=== Tallest buildings ===
Samsun's tallest building is Gökdelen Towers Tower 1 at 115 m followed by the Sheraton Hotel Samsun at 115 m. In recent years dozens of mid-rise residential and commercial buildings have come to populate the city's formerly low-rise skyline.

== Transport ==
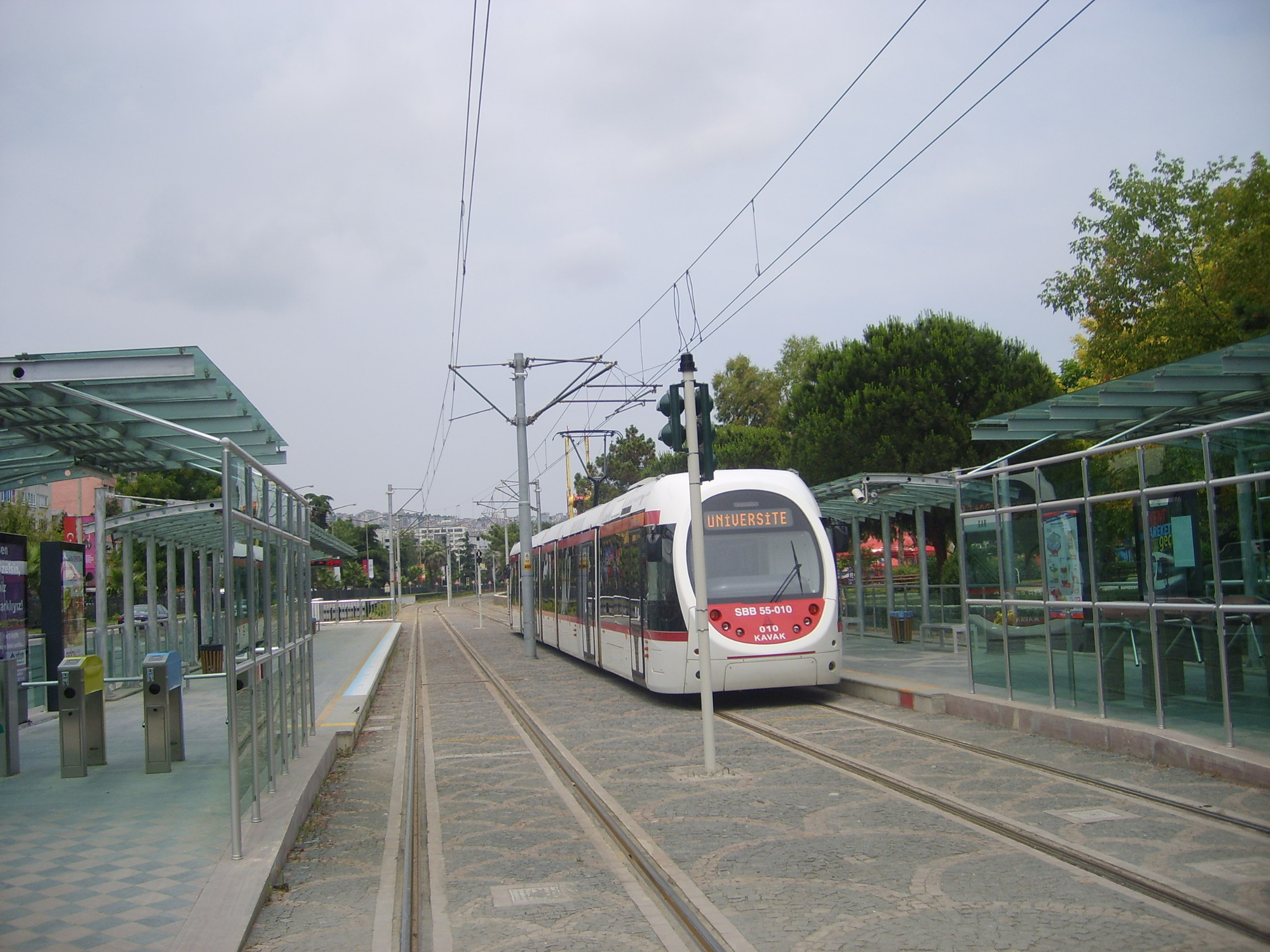
A Sirio tram in Samsun

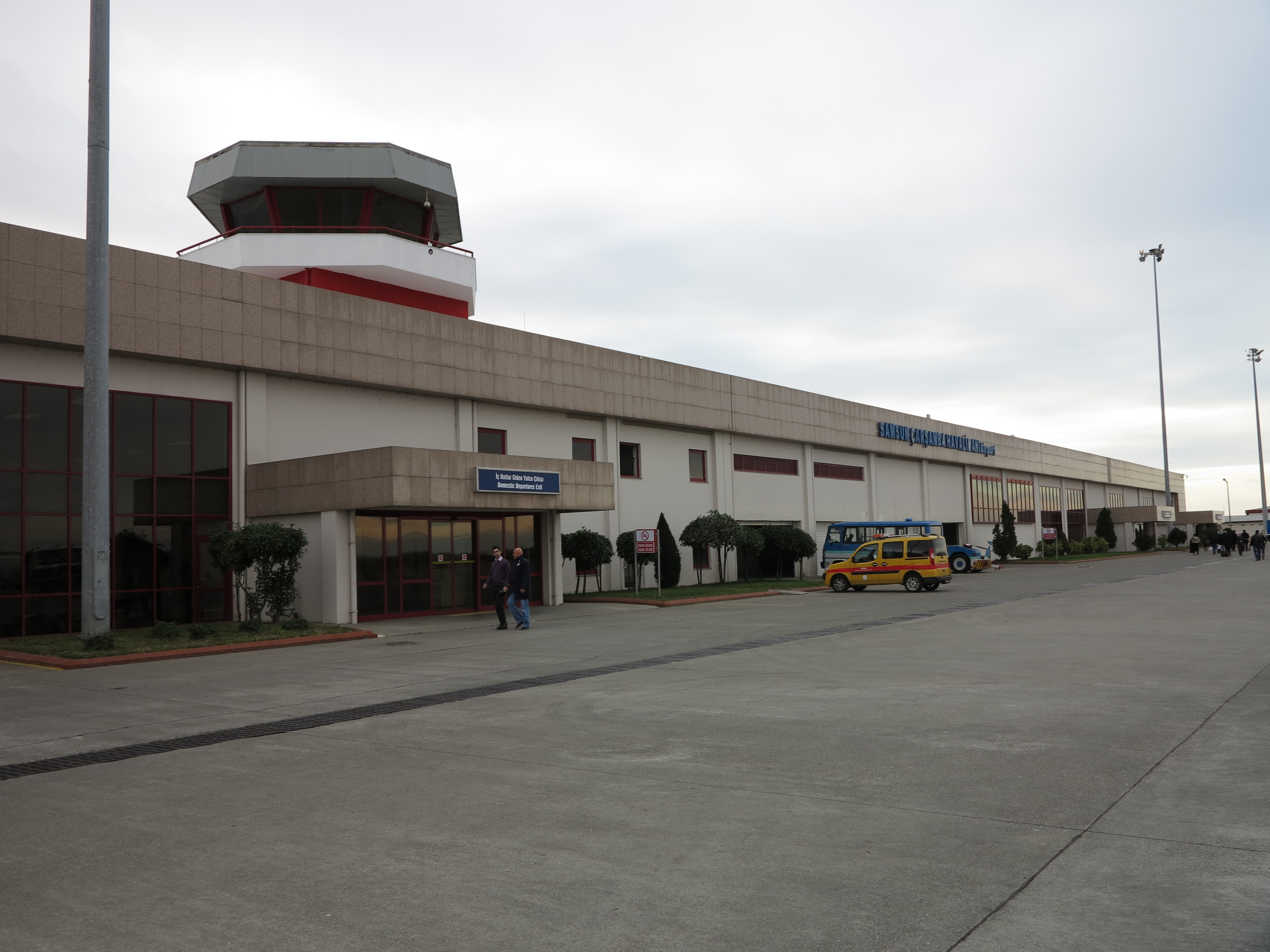
Samsun-Çarşamba Airport

Long distance buses the bus station is outside the city centre, but most bus companies provide a free transfer there if you have a ticket. Passenger and freight trains run to Sivas via Amasya. The train station is in the city center. Freight trains are taken by ferry to railways at Kavkaz in Russia, and will later see service to the port of Varna in Bulgaria and Poti in Georgia.

The Samsun Tram operates between the eastern district of Tekkeköy and Ondokuz Mayıs University. There is a plan to run electrically powered bus rapid transit between the railway station and Tekkekoy. Some city buses are electric. Dolmuş, the routes are numbered 1 to 4 and each route has different color minibuses. The 320 m (1,050 ft) long Samsun Amisos Hill Gondola serves from Batıpark the archaeological area on the Amisos Hill, where ancient tombs in tumuli were discovered.

Samsun Çarşamba Airport is 23 km (14 mi) east of the city center. It is possible to reach the airport by Havas service buses: they depart from the coach park close to Kultur Sarayi in the city center. Horse-drawn carriages, (Turkish: fayton) run along the seafront. There was automated bike rental along the seafront, but it is not currently operational.

== Economy ==
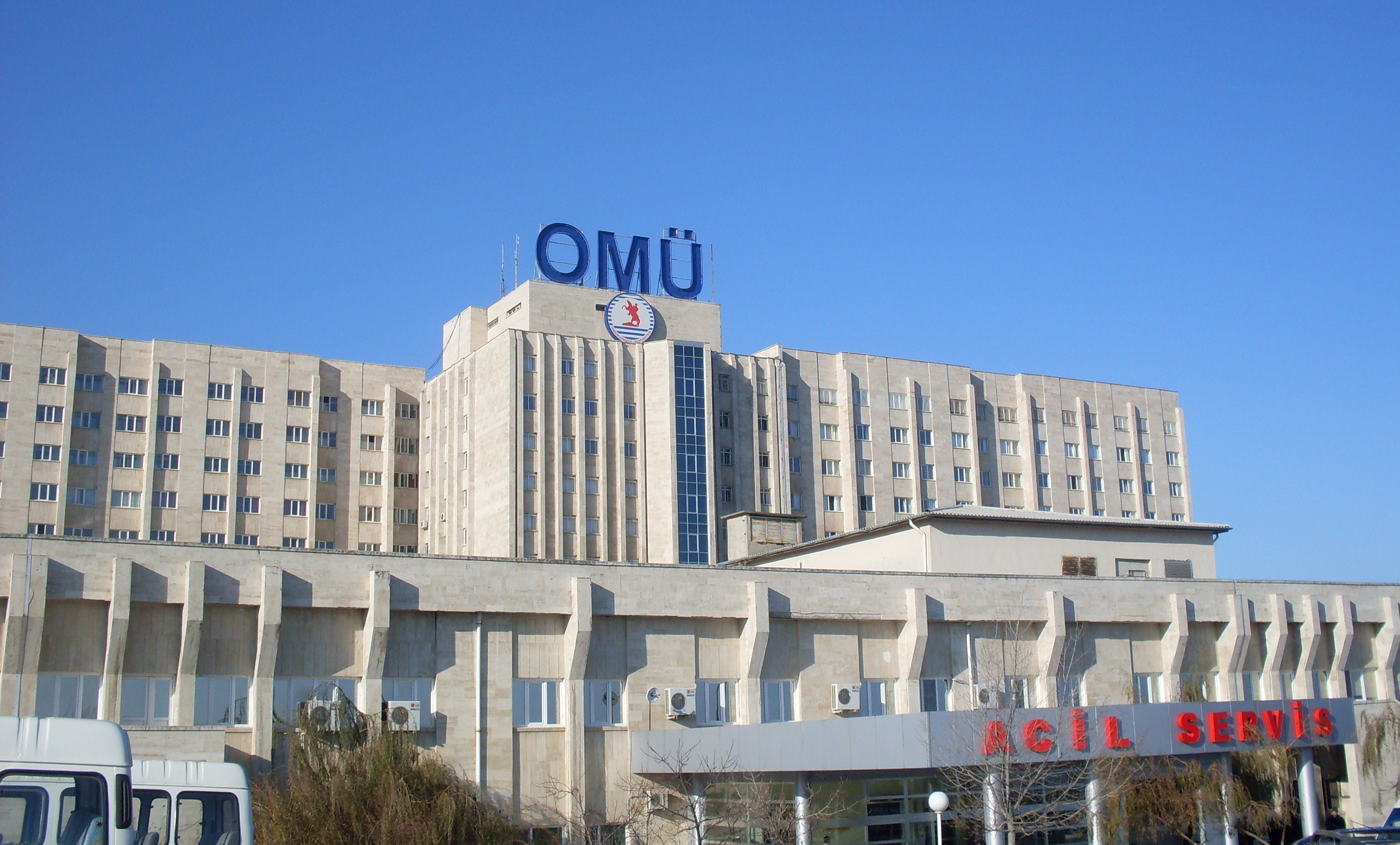
Hospital of Ondokuz Mayıs University's Faculty of Medicine in Samsun

Samsun has a mixed economy with a cluster of medical industries.

=== Ports and shipbuilding ===
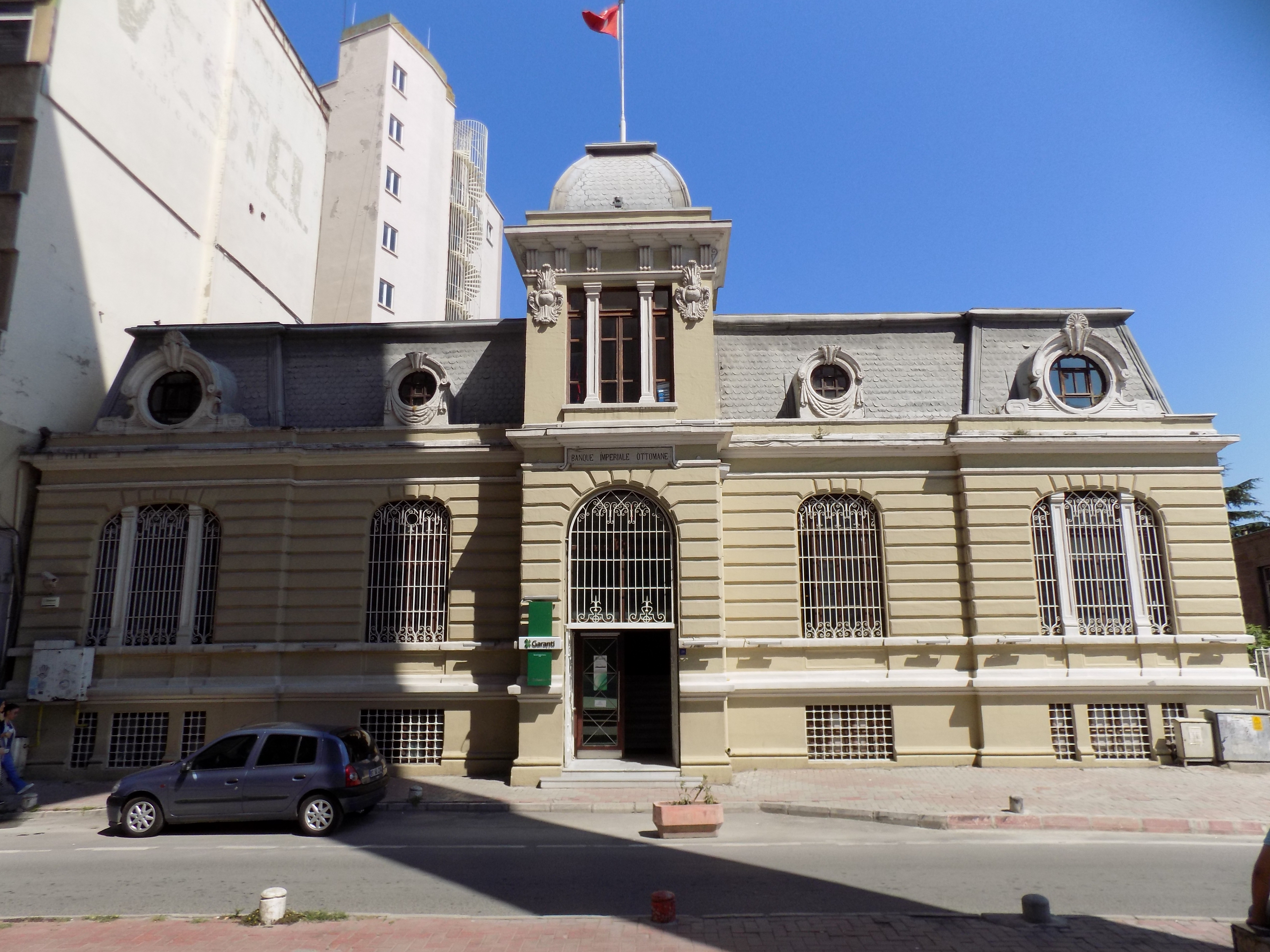
Former Ottoman Bank branch in Samsun

Samsun is a port city. In the early 20th century, the Central Bank of the Republic of Turkey funded the building of a harbor. Before the building of the harbor, ships had to anchor to deliver goods, approximately 1 mile or more from shore. Trade and transportation was focused around a road to and from Sivas. The privately operated port fronting the city centre handles freight, including RORO ferries to Novorossiysk, whereas fishing boats land their catches in a separate harbour slightly further east. A ship building yard is under construction at the eastern city limit. Road and rail freight connections with central Anatolia can be used to send inland both the agricultural produce of the surrounding well rained upon and fertile land, and also imports from overseas.

==== Coal imports from Donbas ====
Donbas anthracite, imported via the Russian ports of Azov and Taganrog, is said to be illegally exported Ukrainian coal. In 2019 some crew were rescued but 6 died after a ship sank in the Black Sea.

=== Manufacturing and food processing ===
There is a light industrial zone between the city and the airport. The main manufactured products are medical devices and products, furniture (wood is imported across the Black Sea), tobacco products (although tobacco farming is now limited by the government), chemicals and automobile spare parts.

Flour mills import wheat from Ukraine and export some of the flour.

=== Local government and services ===
Provincial government and services (e.g. courts, prisons and hospitals) support the surrounding region. Agricultural research establishments support provincial agriculture and food processing.

=== Shopping ===
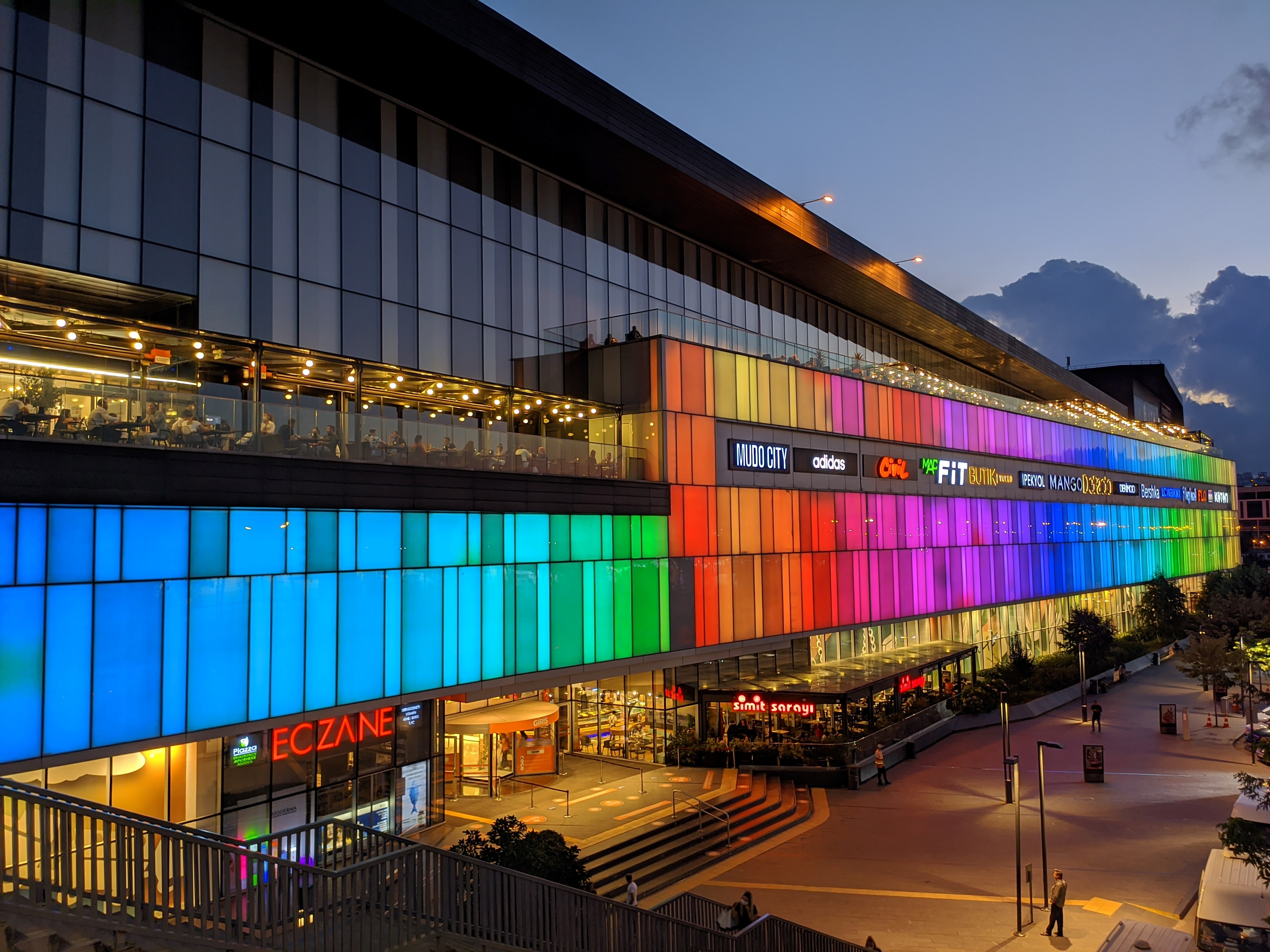
Piazza Samsun

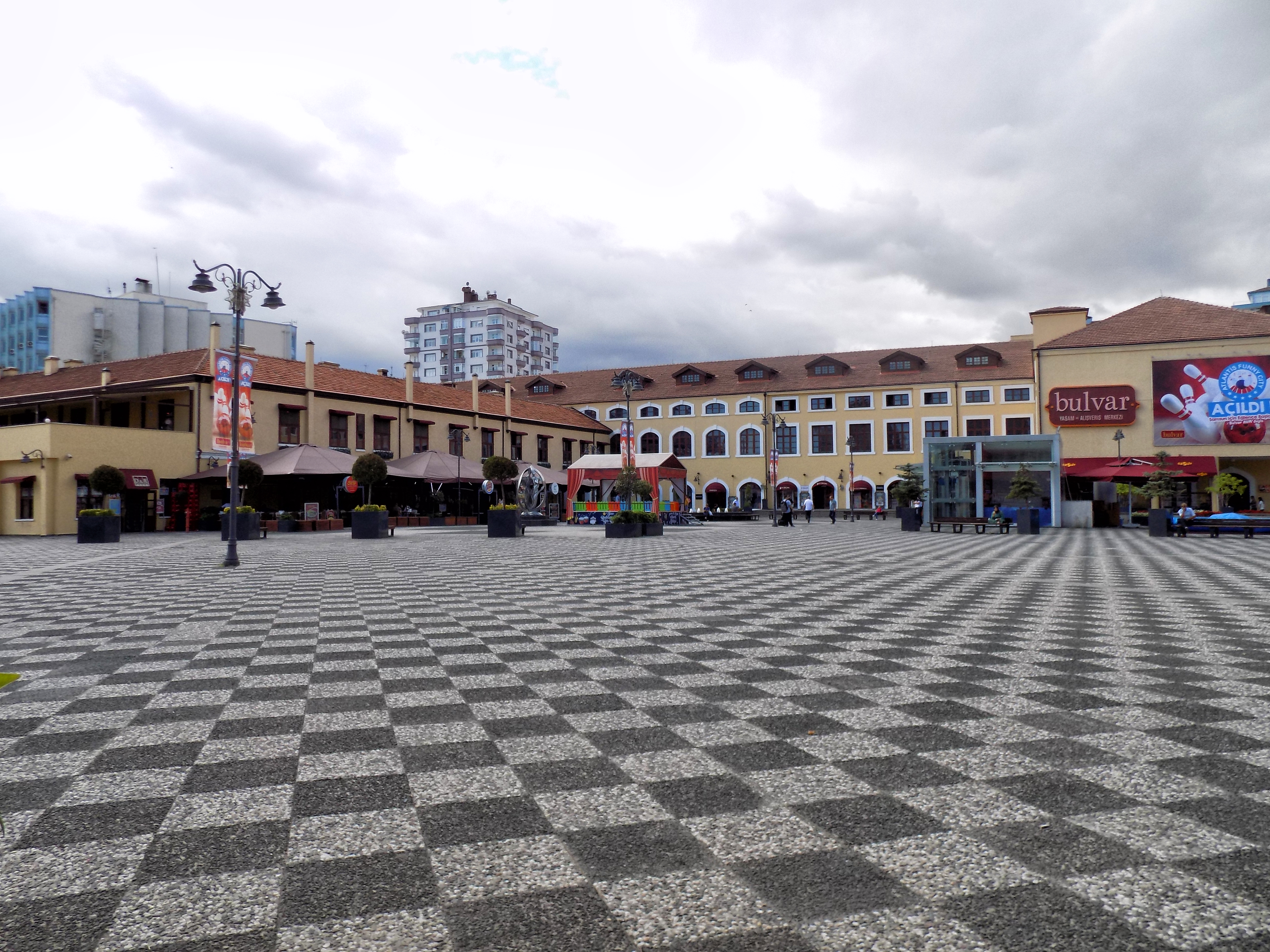
Samsun Bulvar Shopping Mall

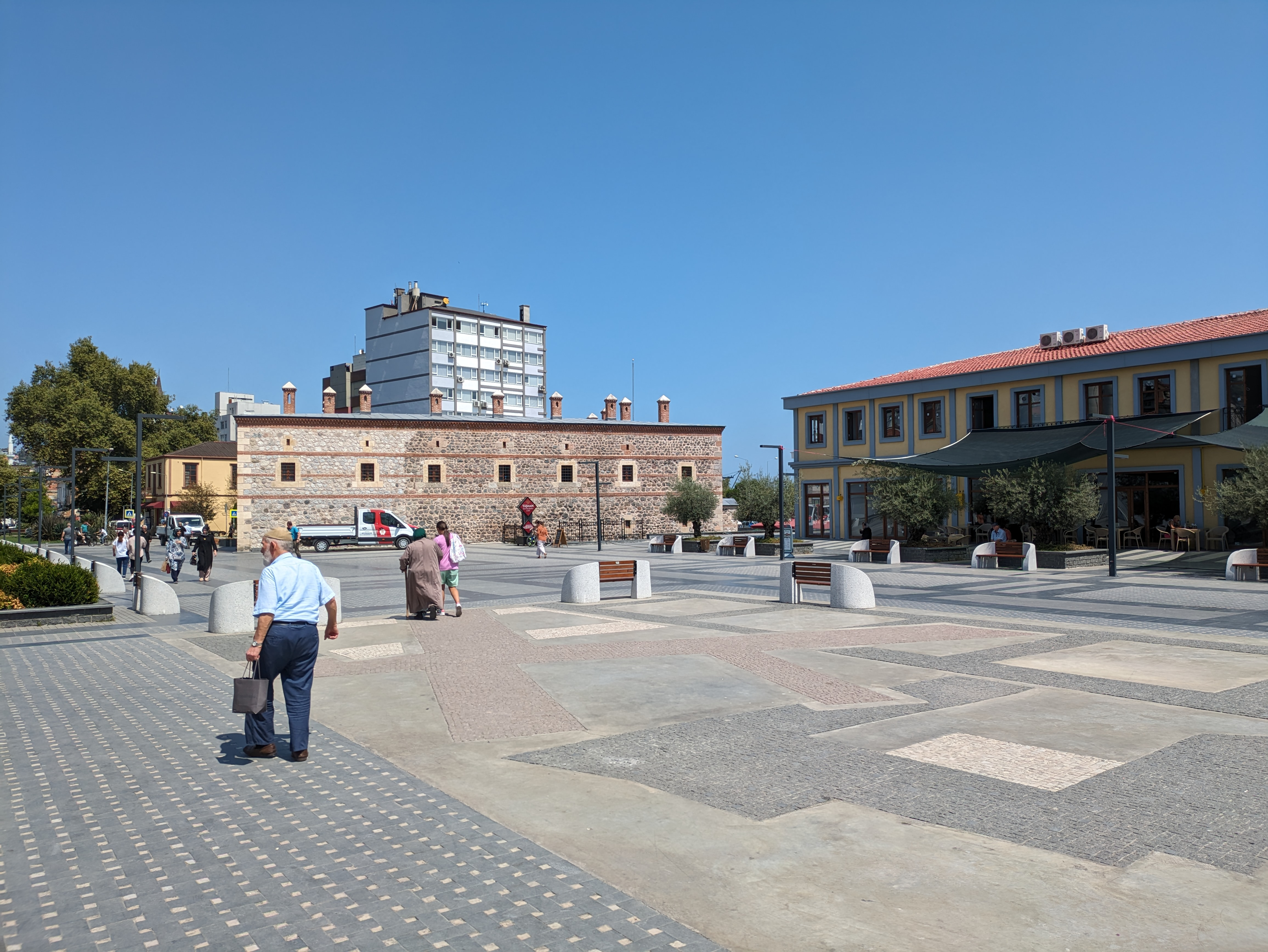
Samsun Saathane Square

Most of the many new shopping malls are purpose built, but the former tobacco factory in the city center has been converted into a mall. Samsun's largest mall is the Piazza Samsun.

== Tourism ==
=== Nature Tourism ===
Samsun has one of the longest coastlines of the Black Sea Region and this strip stretches from Canik until May 19. 90% of this 35 km long coastline consists of fine sandy beaches suitable for swimming, and alternative sports such as surfing, jet skiing and sailing can be practiced besides swimming. There are a total of 39 beaches in Samsun, with the highest number of beaches in Atakum with 19 of them. After Atakum, Alaçam and Çarşamba come with three beaches each. Bafra, Ilkadım and May 19 each have two beaches, and Canik also has one beach. There are no beaches in Asarcık, Ayvacık, Havza, Kavak and Ladik. As of August 2018, all of the beaches measured by the Environmental Health Department are classified as very clean. In addition, 13 beaches, 10 of which are in Atakum, are awarded the Blue Flag beach.

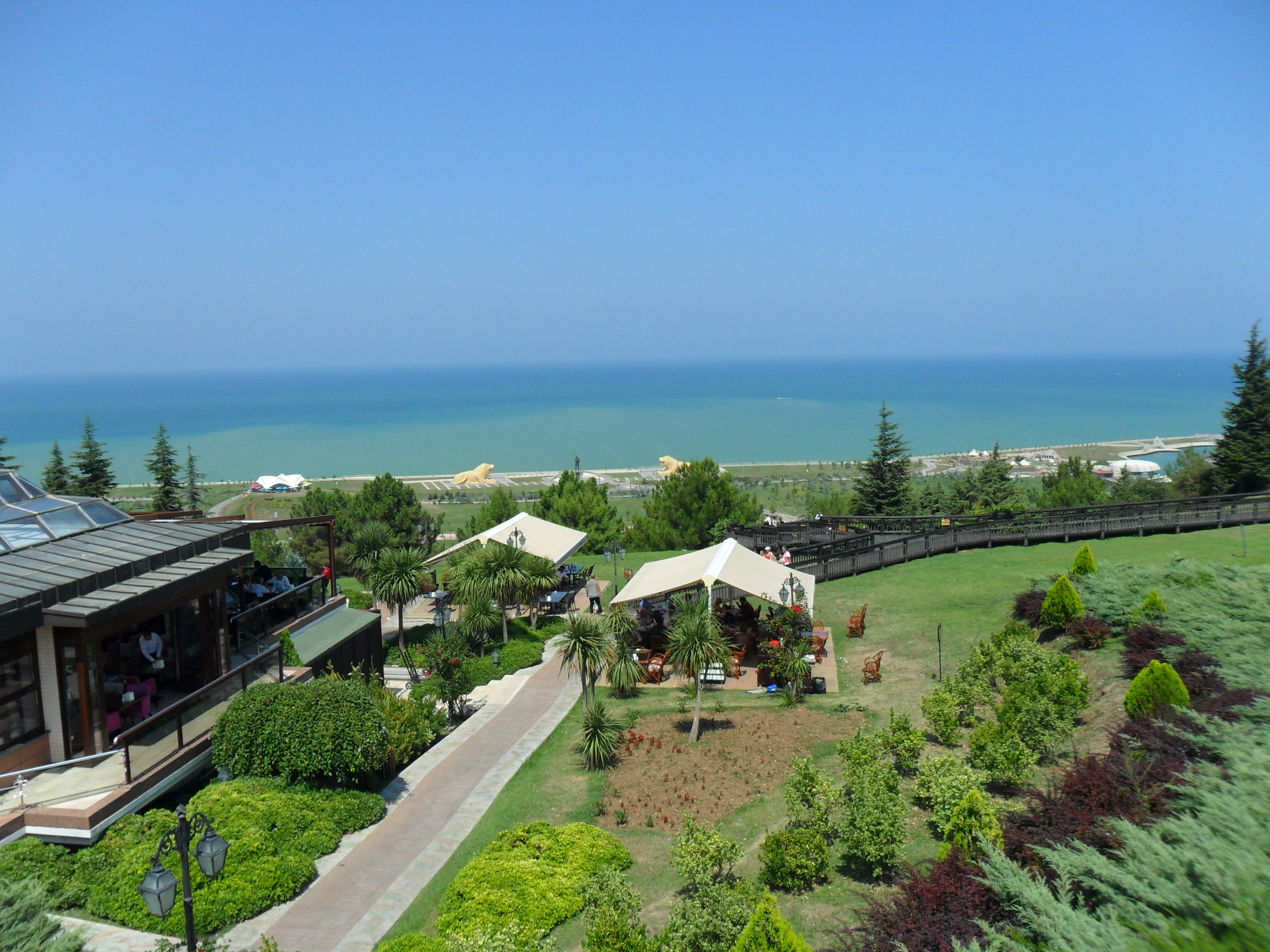
A view of Amisos Hill in Samsun

In Samsun, where activities for winter tourism can be carried out in addition to beach tourism, Akdağ Winter Sports and Ski Center, especially in Ladik, is the most important investment in this area with its 1675 m ski track and 1300 m chair lift, attracting tourists from the surrounding cities. Akdağ also stands out as a paragliding, mountaineering and highland tourism center together with Kocadağ; Nebiyan Mountain is visited by mountaineers, and Kunduz Mountains are visited by transhumance. In addition to natural areas such as Asarağaç Hill, Gölalan Waterfalls and Kabaceviz Waterfall, Çamgölü, Sarıgazel, Vezirköprü nature parks and Çakkır and Hasköy recreation areas have also been brought into tourism in recent years. The Çarşamba Plain and the Galeriç Floodplain, especially the Kızılırmak Delta is frequently visited by bird watchers. May 25 Thermal Tourism Center in Havza, which has been given the status of a tourism center, is the most important health tourism point in Samsun, and the thermal springs in Havza and Ladik are also among the tourism centers of the city. The waters coming out of the hot springs, which are visited by 200 thousand people a year, have been used in the treatment of diseases such as rheumatic diseases, gynecological diseases, nervous diseases, joint diseases and calcification for two thousand years.

== Culture ==
=== The Atatürk Culture Center ===
The Atatürk Cultural Center in Samsun is Turkey's Black Sea Region's venue for the Turkish State Opera and Ballet. Musicals are also staged.

=== Museums ===
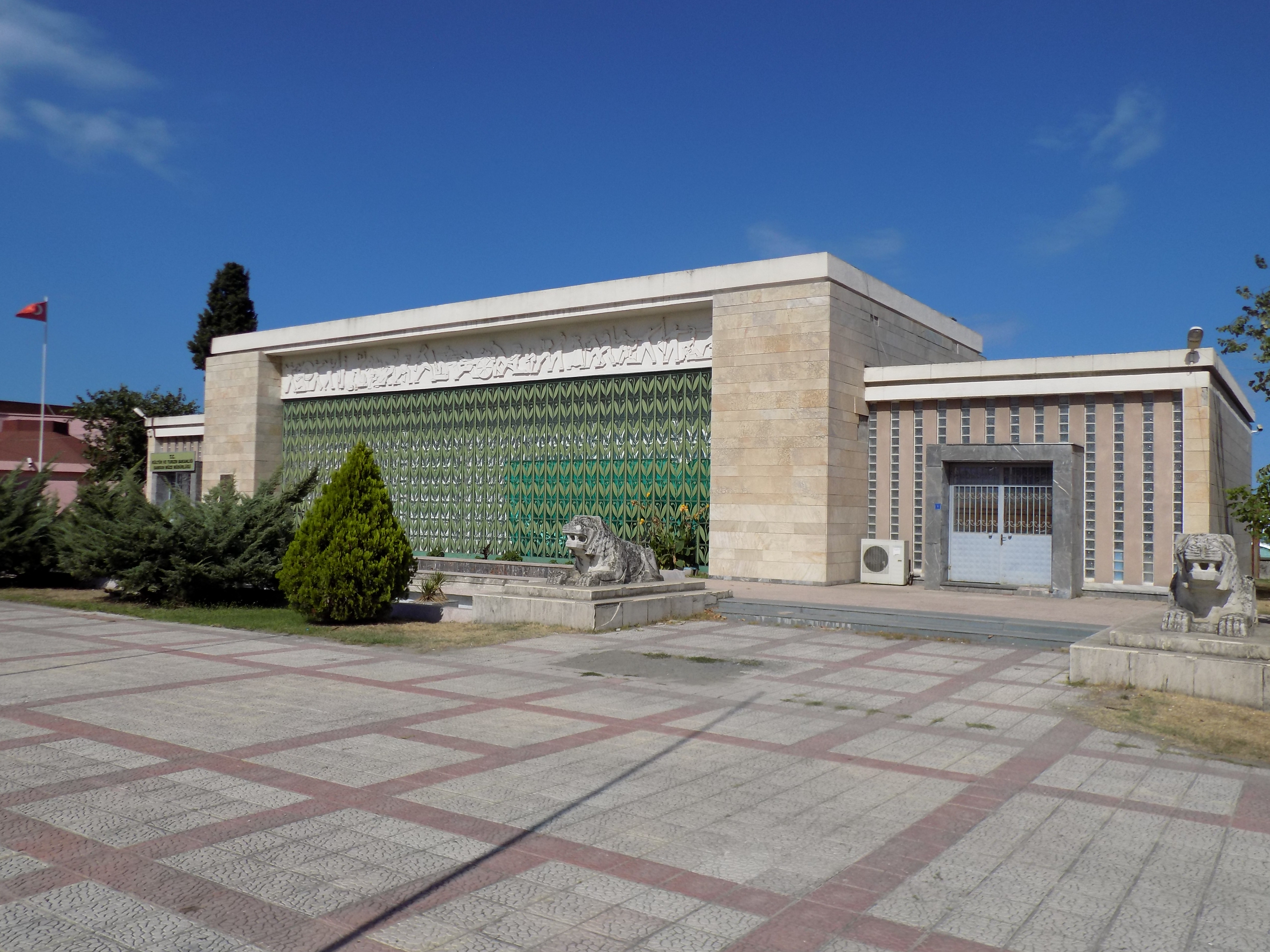
Samsun Archaeology and Ethnographic Museum

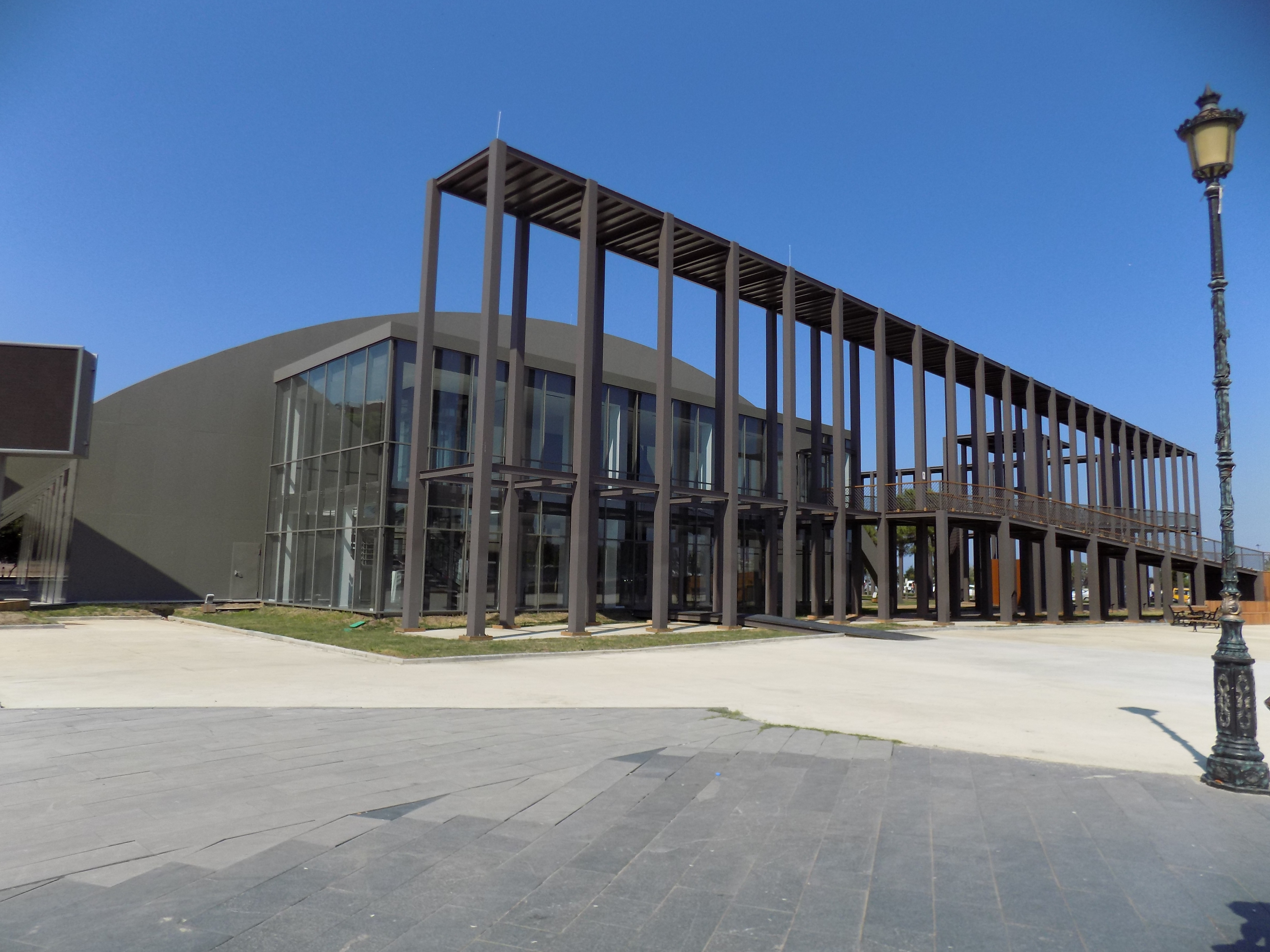
Panorama 1919 Museum in Samsun

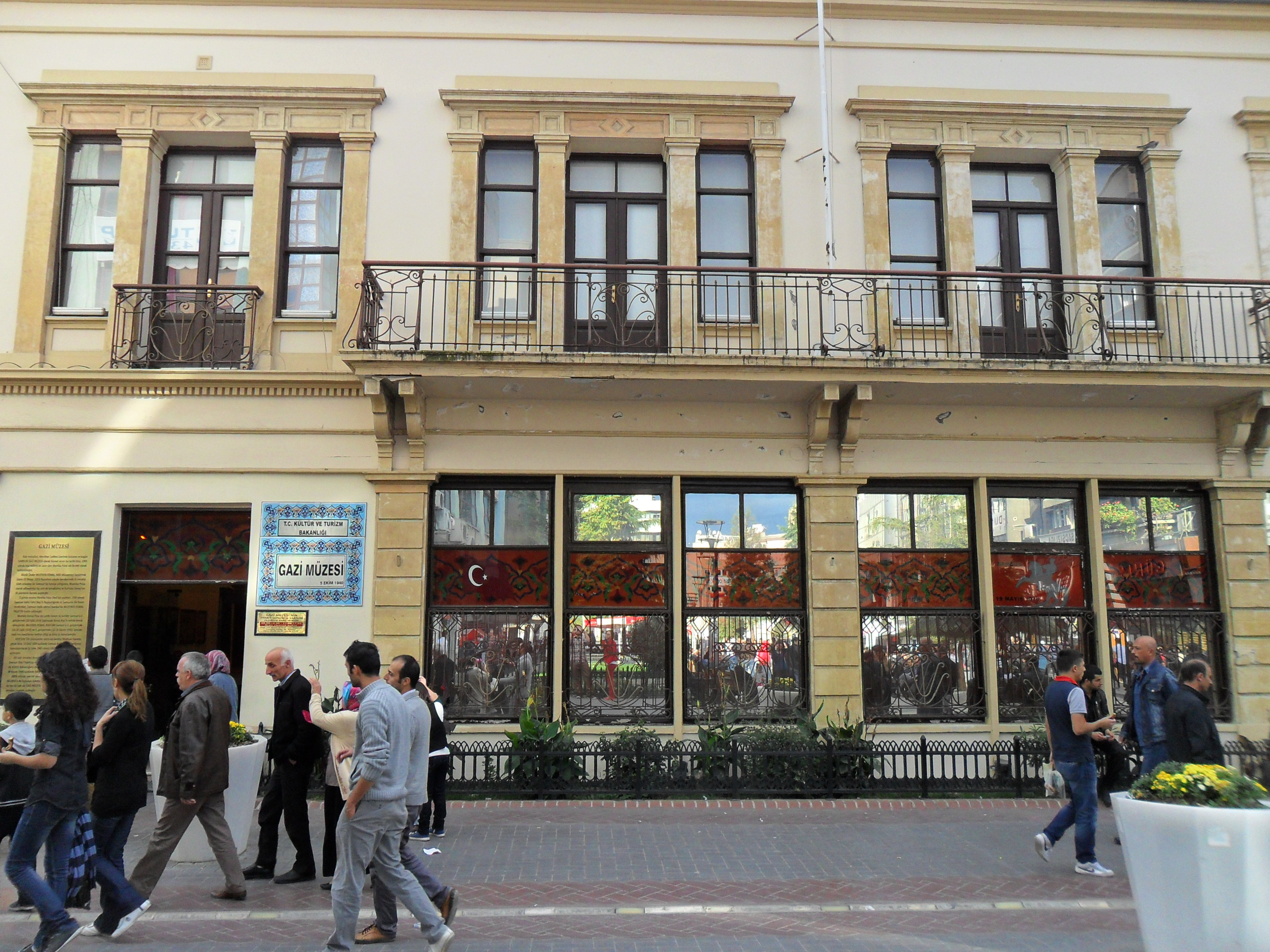
Gazi Museum

- Archaeological and Atatürk Museum. The archaeological part of the museum displays ancient artifacts found in the Samsun area, including the Amisos treasure. The Atatürk section includes photographs of his life and some personal belongings.
- Atatürk (Gazi) Museum. It houses Atatürk's bedroom, his study and conference room as well as some personal belongings.
- Samsun City Museum. A new museum.
- Surgical Instruments and Health Museum, opened in 2021.

=== Folk dancing ===
There is an annual international festival.

== Education ==
There are two universities in Samsun: the state run Ondokuz Mayıs University and the private sector Samsun University. There is also a police training college and many small private colleges.

== Parks, nature reserves and other greenspace ==
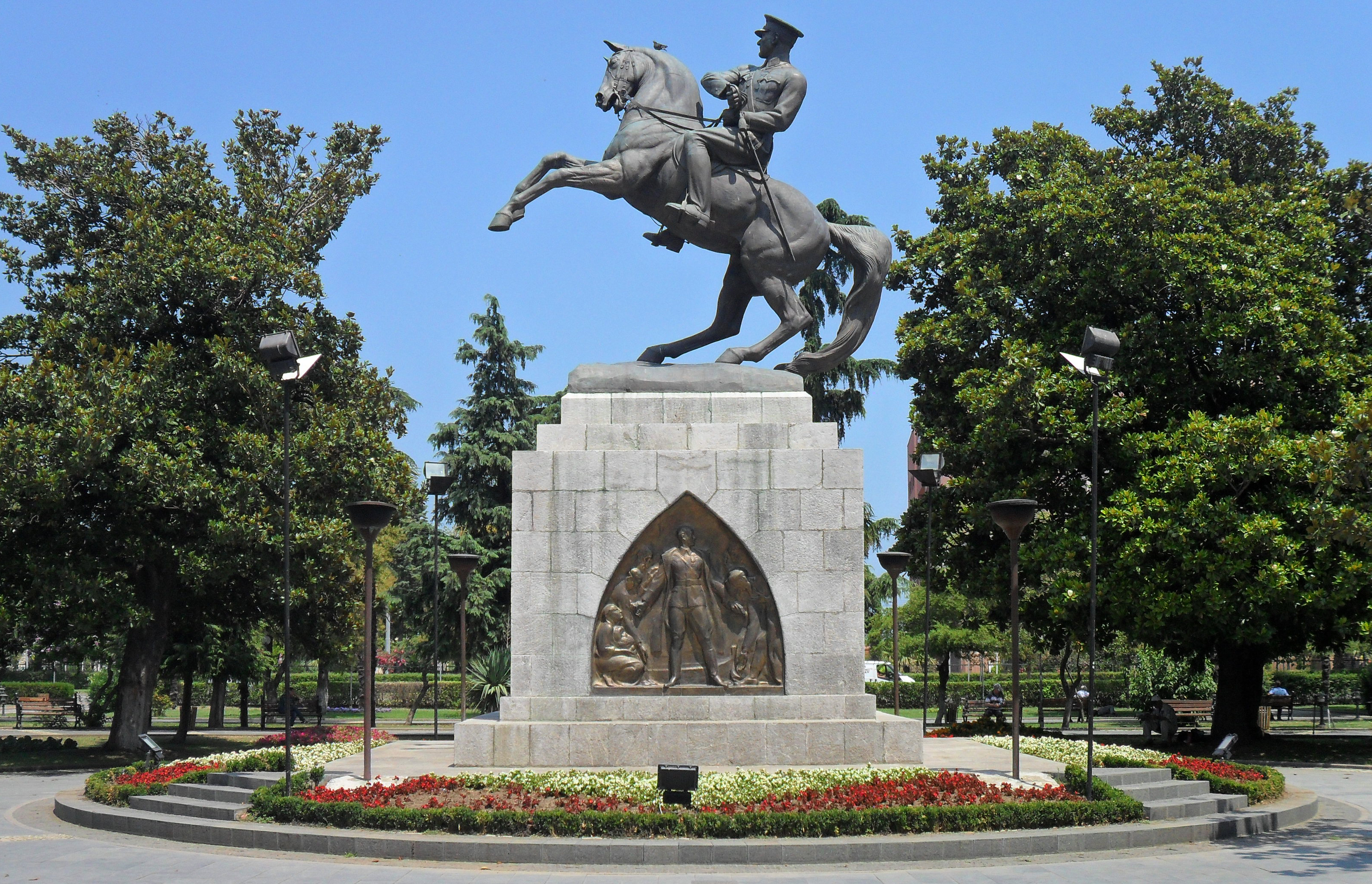
Statue of Atatürk by the Austrian sculptor Heinrich Krippel in Samsun's city center

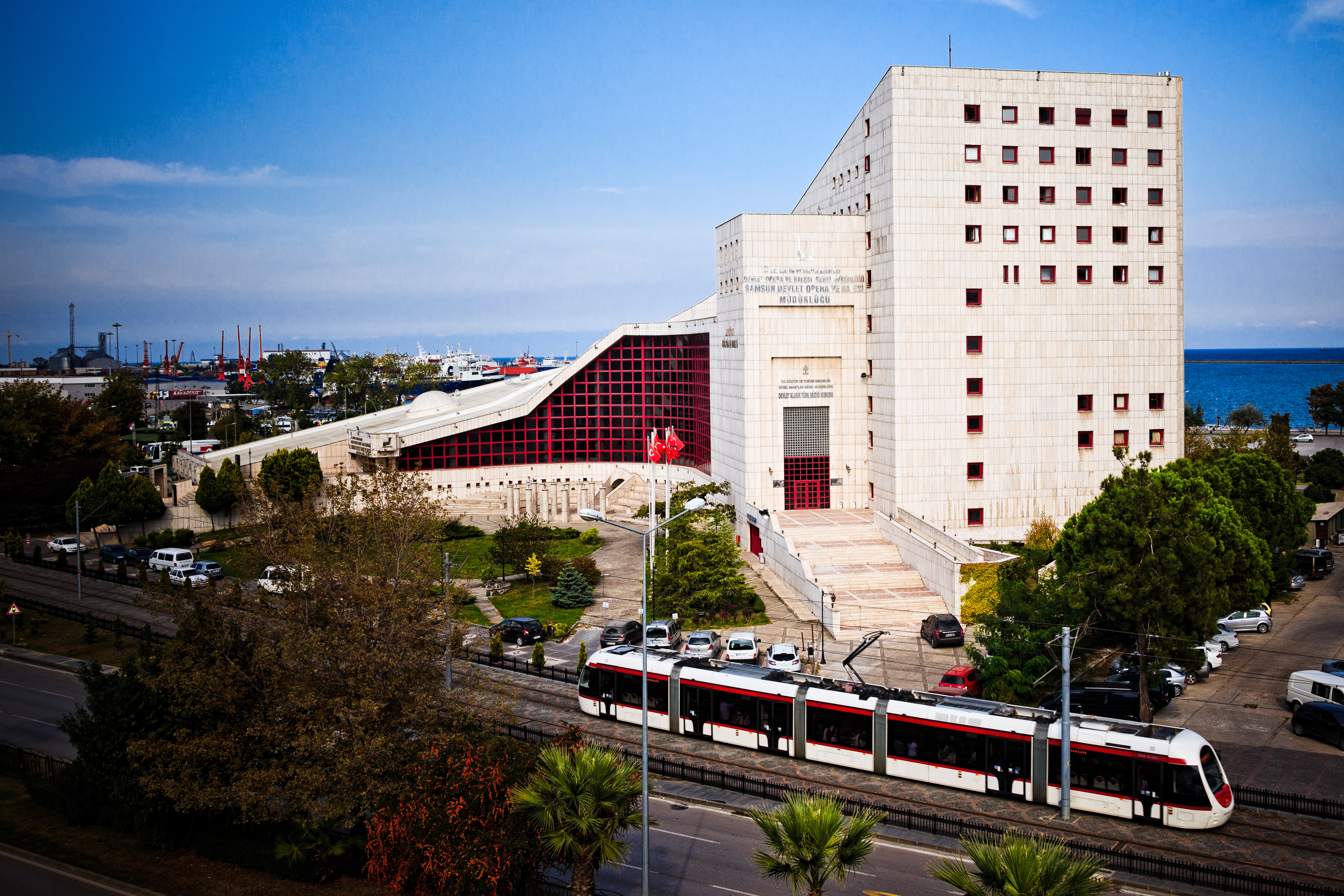
Samsun Opera and Ballet Hall

Parks

- Batı Park (West Park) is a large park on land reclaimed from the sea
- Doğu Park (East Park)
- Atatürk Park contains his statue by Austrian sculptor Heinrich Krippel, which was completed in 1931. The statue was depicted on the obverse of the Turkish 100,000 lira banknotes of 1991–2001.

Nature reserves

- Çakırlar Korusu

Other greenspace

There are several army bases in the city (Esentepe Kışlası, Gökberk Kışlası, 19 Mayis Kışlası and others). Should they become surplus to military requirements in future, for example due to reduced conscription in Turkey, it is currently unclear whether they would become urban open space or be further built on.

== Sports ==
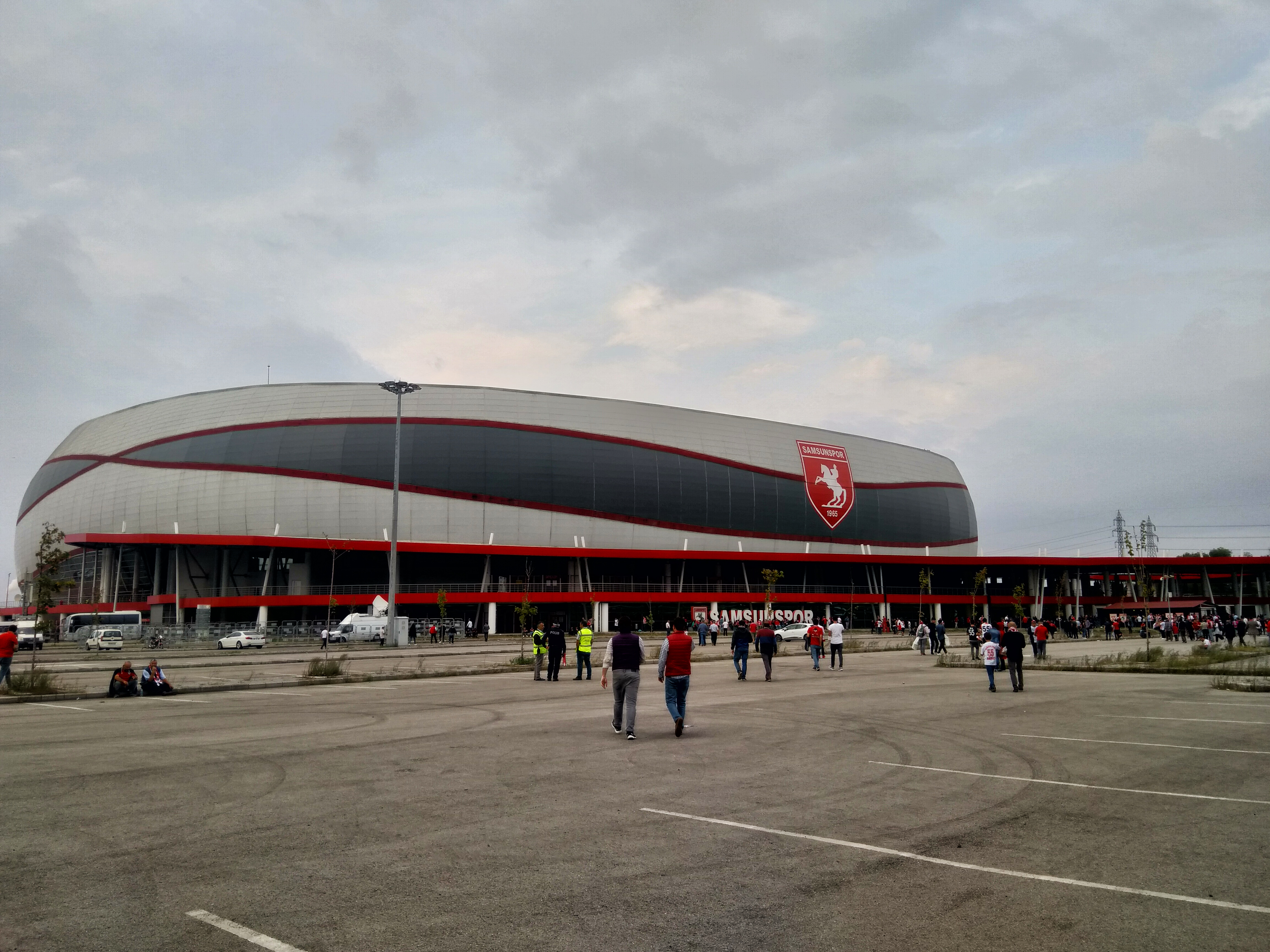
Samsun 19 Mayıs Stadium

In ancient Roman times gladiator sword fighting apparently took place in Amisos, as depicted on a tombstone dating from the 2nd or 3rd century CE.

Tekkeköy Yaşar Doğu Arena opened in 2013.

Football is the most popular sport: in the older districts above the city center children often kick balls around in the evenings in the smallest streets. The city's main club is Samsunspor, which plays its games at the Samsun 19 Mayıs Stadium.

Basketball, volleyball, tennis, swimming, cable skiing (in summer), horse riding, go karting, paintballing, martial arts and many other sports are played. Cycling and jogging are only common along the sea front, where recreational fishing is also popular.

== International relations ==
=== Twin towns—Sister cities ===
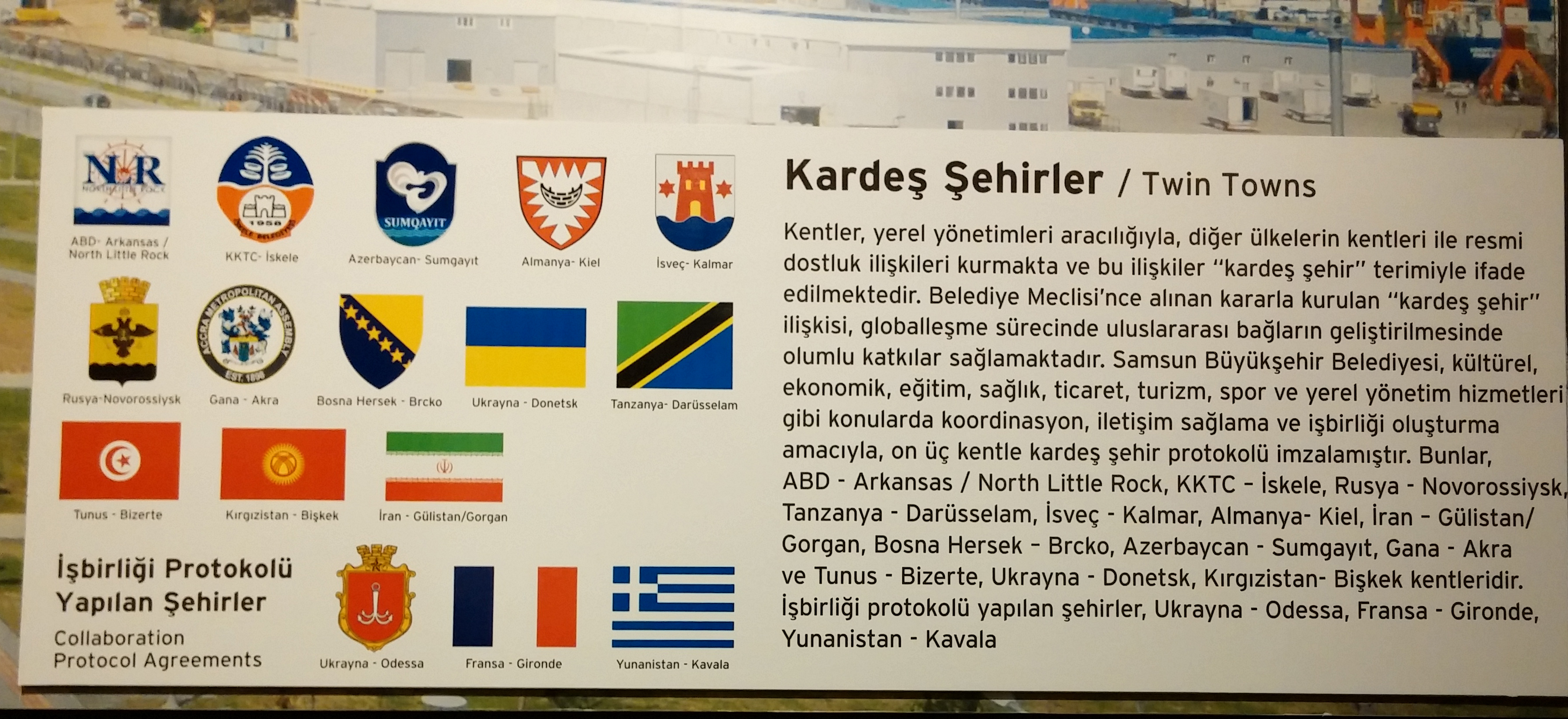
Sister cities of Samsun

Samsun is twinned with:

- North Little Rock, Arkansas, United States (2006)
- Gorgan, Iran (2006)
- İskele, Northern Cyprus (2006)
- Novorossiysk, Russia (2007)
- Dar es Salaam, Tanzania (2007)
- Kalmar, Sweden (2008)
- Bordeaux, France (2010)
- Kiel, Germany (2010)
- Brčko, Bosnia and Herzegovina (2012)
- Bizerte, Tunisia
- Donetsk, Ukraine
- Accra, Ghana
- Bishkek, Kyrgyzstan

== Notable people from Samsun ==
=== Footballers who played for Samsunspor or were born in Samsun ===
- Mete Adanır (1961–1989), Turkish Cypriot football forward
- Nuri Asan (1940–1989), football player and manager
- Ibrahim Eris (1944–2024), was a Turkish-Brazilian economist who served as the 15th President of the Central Bank of Brazil.
- Serkan Aykut (born 1975), former football forward
- Müslüm Can (born 1975), retired footballer
- Tanju Çolak (born 1963), Samsun-born former football forward
- Cenk İşler (born 1974), former football striker and manager
- Mehmet Nas (born 1979), former footballer
- Mehmet Özdilek (born 1966), retired footballer born in Samsun

=== Others ===
- Dionysodorus of Amisene, ancient Greek mathematician
- Arsenios the Cave Dweller (1886–1983), Greek monk and hesychast ascetic
- Anton Pasha (1888–1917), Turkish-speaking Pontic Greek guerrilla and armed leader; the first to organize an armed resistance against the Turks in response to the Greek genocide
- Xenophon Akoglou (1895–1961), Greek folklorist and writer
- Venetia Kotta (1897/1901–1945), Greek archaeologist, museum curator, and Byzantine historian
- A. I. Bezzerides (1908–2007), Greek-American novelist and screenwriter
- Ahmet Demircan (born 1954), Turkish doctor, politician and former Minister of Health of Turkey
- Orhan Gencebay (born 1944), Arabesque musician
- Levent Kırca (1950–2015), comedian, actor, newspaper columnist and politician
- Yaşar Doğu (1913–1961), wrestler
- Ali Baba (1901–1981), Armenian American professional wrestler and World Heavyweight Champion

== Mayors ==
- 1968–1980 and 1984–1987 Kemal Vehbi Gül (AP, ANAP)
- 1987–1989 Ruhat Çetinkaya (ANAP)
- 1989–1999 Muzaffer Önder (SHP, CHP)
- 1999–2018 Yusuf Ziya Yılmaz (ANAP, AK Party)
- 2018–2019 Zihni Şahin (AK Party)
- 2019–2024 Mustafa Demir (AK Party)
- 2024–present Halit Doğan (AK Party)

== See also ==
- Anatolian Tigers
- Beyliks of Canik
- State road D010 (Turkey)
- Samsun Castle
- Category:Tourist attractions in Samsun
