= Amisos Treasure =

Treasure trove found in Turkey

The Amisos treasure was discovered in 1995 in a suburb of Samsun, Turkey, when roadwork construction unearthed a tomb dating back to the Kingdom of Pontus. It is currently on display at the Archaeological and Atatürk Museum in Samsun.

The treasure could have belonged to the sixth Pontus king, Mithridates Philopator Philadelphus. The contents were: "a pure gold king's crown, 15 gold buttons, four gold bracelets with human and animal figures on it, 18 broken gold bracelets, a gold barette, two gold earrings, 10 big gold necklaces, a gold ring with a gem, 24 necklaces, 424 beads, a glass bowl, four earthenware, three kerosene lamps and an earthenware plate."
