= Athenocles of Athens =

Ancient Greek leader

Athenocles (Ancient Greek: Ἀθηνοκλῆς) was a man of ancient Greece who was said to have led a colony of Athenians who settled at Amisus in Pontus, and called the place "Peiraeus". The date of this event is uncertain.

This comes to us from the historian Strabo, who himself claims to be quoting a tradition from the historian Theopompus.
