= List of populated places in Samsun Province =

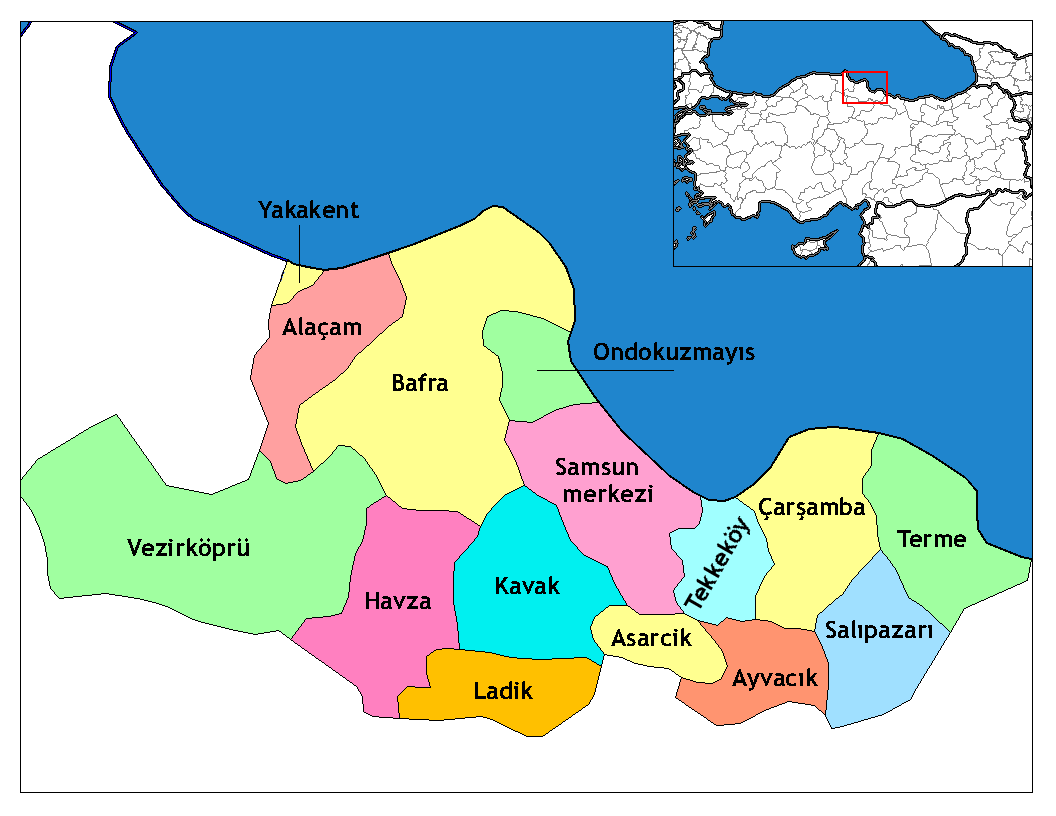
Samsun Province

Below is the list of populated places in Samsun Province, Turkey by the districts. The first four districts (Atakum, Canik, İlkadım, Tekkeköy) are actually parts of the city of Greater Samsun. In the following lists, the first place in each district list is the administrative center of that district.

== Atakum ==
- Atakum
- Akalan, Atakum
- Aksu, Atakum
- Aslandamı, Atakum
- Çamlıyazı, Atakum
- Çatmaoluk, Atakum
- Elmaçukuru, Atakum
- Erikli, Atakum
- Güneyköy, Atakum
- Kabadüz, Atakum
- Kamalı, Atakum
- Karakavuk, Atakum
- Karaoyumca, Atakum
- Kayagüney, Atakum
- Kesilli, Atakum
- Köseli, Atakum
- Kulacadağ, Atakum
- Kurugökçe, Atakum
- Meyvalı, Atakum
- Özören, Atakum
- Sarayköy, Atakum
- Sarıışık, Atakum
- Sarıtaş, Atakum
- Sarıyusuf, Atakum
- Şenyurt, Atakum
- Yeşiltepe, Atakum
- Yukarıaksu, Atakum

== Canik ==
- Canik
- Alibeyli, Canik
- Ambarpınar, Canik
- Avluca, Canik
- Başalan, Canik
- Başkonak, Canik
- Çağlayan, Canik
- Çamalan, Canik
- Demirci, Canik
- Dereler, Canik
- Devgeriş, Canik
- Düvecik, Canik
- Düzardıç, Canik
- Düzören, Canik
- Fındıcak, Canik
- Gaziköy, Canik
- Gecehan, Canik
- Gödekli, Canik
- Gökçepınar, Canik
- Gölalan, Canik
- Gültepe, Canik
- Gürgenyatak, Canik
- Hacınaipli, Canik
- Hilaltepe, Canik
- İmamlar, Canik
- Kaleboğazı, Canik
- Kaşyayla, Canik
- Kestanepınar, Canik
- Kızıloğlak, Canik
- Kozlu, Canik
- Muratlı, Canik
- Sarıbıyık, Canik
- Şirinköy, Canik
- Tekkiraz, Canik
- Teknepınar, Canik
- Toygar, Canik
- Tuzaklı, Canik
- Uluçayır, Canik
- Üçpınar, Canik
- Yayla, Canik
- Yeniköy, Canik
- Yeşilpınar, Canik

== İlkadım ==
- İlkadım
- Akgöl, İlkadım
- Aşağıavdan, İlkadım
- Avdan, İlkadım
- Bilmece, İlkadım
- Çanakçı, İlkadım
- Çandır, İlkadım
- Çatkaya, İlkadım
- Çelikalan, İlkadım
- Çivril, İlkadım
- Gürgendağ, İlkadım
- Kapaklı, İlkadım

== Tekkeköy ==
- Tekkeköy
- Akbaşlar, Tekkeköy
- Antyeri, Tekkeköy
- Bakacak, Tekkeköy
- Balcalı, Tekkeköy
- Başköy, Tekkeköy
- Beyoğlu, Tekkeköy
- Çayırçökek, Tekkeköy
- Çınaralan, Tekkeköy
- Çimenli, Tekkeköy
- Erenköy, Tekkeköy
- Gökçedere, Tekkeköy
- Güzelyurt, Tekkeköy
- Karaperçin, Tekkeköy
- Kargılı, Tekkeköy
- Karışlar, Tekkeköy
- Kerpiçli, Tekkeköy
- Kışla, Tekkeköy
- Kibarlar, Tekkeköy
- Sarıyurt, Tekkeköy
- Seymenler, Tekkeköy
- Sıtmasuyu, Tekkeköy
- Yağbasan, Tekkeköy
- Yaylageriş, Tekkeköy
- Yazılar, Tekkeköy
- Yenidoğan, Tekkeköy
- Yeniköy, Tekkeköy
- Yeşilalan, Tekkeköy
- Yeşildere, Tekkeköy
- Yeşilyurt, Tekkeköy
- Yukarıçinik, Tekkeköy
- Zafer, Tekkeköy

== Alaçam ==
- Alaçam
- Akbulut, Alaçam
- Akgüney, Alaçam
- Alidedebölmesi, Alaçam
- Aşağıakgüney, Alaçam
- Aşağıısırganlı, Alaçam
- Aşağıkoçlu, Alaçam
- Bahşioymağı, Alaçam
- Demircideresi, Alaçam
- Doğankent, Alaçam
- Doyran, Alaçam
- Etyemez, Alaçam
- Göçkün, Alaçam
- Gökçeağaçoymağı, Alaçam
- Gökçeboğaz, Alaçam
- Gülkaya, Alaçam
- Gümüşova, Alaçam
- Güvenli, Alaçam
- Habilli, Alaçam
- Harmancık, Alaçam
- Kalıkdemirci, Alaçam
- Kapaklı, Alaçam
- Karaçukur, Alaçam
- Karahüseyinli, Alaçam
- Karlı, Alaçam
- Kışlakonak, Alaçam
- Kızlan, Alaçam
- Killik, Alaçam
- Köseköy, Alaçam
- Ortaköy, Alaçam
- Örenli, Alaçam
- Pelitbükü, Alaçam
- Pilitbüküsekicek, Alaçam
- Sancar, Alaçam
- Sarılık, Alaçam
- Soğukçam, Alaçam
- Şirinköy, Alaçam
- Taşkelik, Alaçam
- Tefekli, Alaçam
- Tepebölmesi, Alaçam
- Terskırık, Alaçam
- Toplu, Alaçam
- Umutlu, Alaçam
- Uzunkıraç, Alaçam
- Vicikler, Alaçam
- Yenice, Alaçam
- Yeniköy, Alaçam
- Yeşilköy, Alaçam
- Yoğunpelit, Alaçam
- Yukarıelma, Alaçam
- Yukarıısırganlı, Alaçam
- Yukarıkoçlu, Alaçam
- Yukarısoğukçam, Alaçam
- Zeytin, Alaçam

== Asarcık ==
- Asarcık
- Acısu, Asarcık
- Akyazı, Asarcık
- Alan, Asarcık
- Alişar, Asarcık
- Arıcak, Asarcık
- Armutlu, Asarcık
- Aşuru, Asarcık
- Ayaklıalan, Asarcık
- Aydınköy, Asarcık
- Çulhaoğlu, Asarcık
- Dağcılar, Asarcık
- Emirmusa, Asarcık
- Esentepe, Asarcık
- Gökgöl, Asarcık
- Gülveren, Asarcık
- Gündoğdu, Asarcık
- Hisariye, Asarcık
- İmamlı, Asarcık
- Kesealan, Asarcık
- Kılavuzlu, Asarcık
- Koşaca, Asarcık
- Kuyumcuoğlu, Asarcık
- Musaağa, Asarcık
- Sakızlık, Asarcık
- Uluköy, Asarcık
- Yarımca, Asarcık
- Yaylaköy, Asarcık
- Yeniömerli, Asarcık
- Yeşildere, Asarcık
- Yeşilköy, Asarcık

== Ayvacık ==
- Ayvacık
- Ardıç, Ayvacık
- Başalan, Ayvacık
- Çamalan, Ayvacık
- Çamlıkale, Ayvacık
- Çarşıköy, Ayvacık
- Çökekli, Ayvacık
- Döngel, Ayvacık
- Döngelyatak, Ayvacık
- Esenyurt, Ayvacık
- Eynel, Ayvacık
- Gülpınar, Ayvacık
- Gültepe, Ayvacık
- Gürçam, Ayvacık
- Güzelyurt, Ayvacık
- Kabaklık, Ayvacık
- Kapıkaya, Ayvacık
- Karaağaç, Ayvacık
- Karşıdöngel, Ayvacık
- Kazancılı, Ayvacık
- Koçyurdu, Ayvacık
- Ortaköy, Ayvacık
- Osmanlı, Ayvacık
- Örencik, Ayvacık
- Sahilköy, Ayvacık
- Söğütpınarı, Ayvacık
- Şenpınar, Ayvacık
- Terice, Ayvacık
- Tiryakioğlu, Ayvacık
- Uğurlu, Ayvacık
- Yenice, Ayvacık
- Yeniköy, Ayvacık
- Yeşilçam, Ayvacık
- Yeşildere, Ayvacık
- Yeşilpınar, Ayvacık
- Zafer, Ayvacık

== Bafra ==
- Bafra
- Adaköy, Bafra
- Ağcaalan, Bafra
- Ağıllar, Bafra
- Akalan, Bafra
- Aktekke, Bafra
- Alaçam, Bafra
- Altınay, Bafra
- Altınova, Bafra
- Asar, Bafra
- Asmaçam, Bafra
- Azay, Bafra
- Bakırpınarı, Bafra
- Balıklar, Bafra
- Barış, Bafra
- Başaran, Bafra
- Başkaya, Bafra
- Bengü, Bafra
- Boğazkaya, Bafra
- Burunca, Bafra
- Çalköy, Bafra
- Çamaltı, Bafra
- Çatak, Bafra
- Çataltepe, Bafra
- Çetinkaya, Bafra
- Çulhakoca, Bafra
- Darboğaz, Bafra
- Dededağı, Bafra
- Dedeli, Bafra
- Derbent, Bafra
- Dereler, Bafra
- Dikencik, Bafra
- Doğanca, Bafra
- Doğankaya, Bafra
- Düzköy, Bafra
- Elalan, Bafra
- Eldavut, Bafra
- Elifli, Bafra
- Emenli, Bafra
- Esençay, Bafra
- Evrenuşağı, Bafra
- Eynegazi, Bafra
- Fener, Bafra
- Gazibeyli, Bafra
- Gerzeliler, Bafra
- Gökalan, Bafra
- Gökçeağaç, Bafra
- Gökçekent, Bafra
- Gökçesu, Bafra
- Göltepe, Bafra
- Gümüşyaprak, Bafra
- Hacıoğlu, Bafra
- Harız, Bafra
- Hıdırellez, Bafra
- Hüseyinbeyli, Bafra
- İğdir, Bafra
- İkizpınar, Bafra
- İkiztepe, Bafra
- İlyaslı, Bafra
- İnözükoşaca, Bafra
- Kahraman, Bafra
- Kalaycılı, Bafra
- Kamberli, Bafra
- Kanlıgüney, Bafra
- Kapıkaya, Bafra
- Karaburç, Bafra
- Karakütük, Bafra
- Karıncak, Bafra
- Karpuzlu, Bafra
- Kasnakcımermer, Bafra
- Kaygusuz, Bafra
- Kelikler, Bafra
- Keresteci, Bafra
- Kolay, Bafra
- Komşupınar, Bafra
- Koruluk, Bafra
- Koşu, Bafra
- Kozağzı, Bafra
- Köseli, Bafra
- Kuşçular, Bafra
- Kuşluğan, Bafra
- Kuzalan, Bafra
- Küçükkavakpınar, Bafra
- Lengerli, Bafra
- Meşelitürkmenler, Bafra
- Müstecep, Bafra
- Ortadurak, Bafra
- Osmanbeyli, Bafra
- Ozan, Bafra
- Örencik, Bafra
- Paşaşeyh, Bafra
- Sahilkent, Bafra
- Sarıçevre, Bafra
- Sarıkaya, Bafra
- Sarıköy, Bafra
- Sarpın, Bafra
- Selemelik, Bafra
- Sürmeli, Bafra
- Şahinkaya, Bafra
- Şeyhören, Bafra
- Şeyhulaş, Bafra
- Şirinköy, Bafra
- Taşköprü, Bafra
- Tepebaşı, Bafra
- Tepecik, Bafra
- Terzili, Bafra
- Türbe, Bafra
- Türkköyü, Bafra
- Tütüncüler, Bafra
- Uluağaç, Bafra
- Üçpınar, Bafra
- Yağmurca, Bafra
- Yakıntaş, Bafra
- Yenialan, Bafra
- Yeniköy, Bafra
- Yeraltı, Bafra
- Yeşilköy, Bafra
- Yeşilyazı, Bafra
- Yiğitalan, Bafra
- Yörgüç, Bafra

== Çarşamba ==
- Çarşamba
- Acıklı, Çarşamba
- Ağcagüney, Çarşamba
- Ahubaba, Çarşamba
- Akçaltı, Çarşamba
- Akçatarla, Çarşamba
- Akkuzulu, Çarşamba
- Alibeyli, Çarşamba
- Allı, Çarşamba
- Arımköseli, Çarşamba
- Aşağıdikencik, Çarşamba
- Aşağıdonurlu, Çarşamba
- Aşağıesenli, Çarşamba
- Aşağıkavacık, Çarşamba
- Aşağımusalla, Çarşamba
- Aşağıturgutlu, Çarşamba
- Aşıklı, Çarşamba
- Ataköy, Çarşamba
- Bafracalı, Çarşamba
- Bayramlı, Çarşamba
- Beylerce, Çarşamba
- Beyyenice, Çarşamba
- Bezirgan, Çarşamba
- Boyacılı, Çarşamba
- Bölmeçayırı, Çarşamba
- Canlı, Çarşamba
- Cumhuriyet, Çarşamba
- Çaltı, Çarşamba
- Çatak, Çarşamba
- Çayvar, Çarşamba
- Çelikli, Çarşamba
- Çerçiler, Çarşamba
- Çınarlık, Çarşamba
- Dalbahçe, Çarşamba
- Damlataş, Çarşamba
- Demirarslan, Çarşamba
- Demircili, Çarşamba
- Demirli, Çarşamba
- Denizler, Çarşamba
- Deyincek, Çarşamba
- Dikbıyık, Çarşamba
- Durakbaşı, Çarşamba
- Durusu, Çarşamba
- Eğridere, Çarşamba
- Eğrikum, Çarşamba
- Epçeli, Çarşamba
- Esençay, Çarşamba
- Esentepe, Çarşamba
- Gökçeçakmak, Çarşamba
- Gökçeli, Çarşamba
- Güldere, Çarşamba
- Gülören, Çarşamba
- Gülyazı, Çarşamba
- Güneşli, Çarşamba
- Hacılıçay, Çarşamba
- Helvacalı, Çarşamba
- Hürriyet, Çarşamba
- Irmaksırtı, Çarşamba
- Kabaceviz, Çarşamba
- Karaağaç, Çarşamba
- Karabahçe, Çarşamba
- Karacalı, Çarşamba
- Karakaya, Çarşamba
- Karakulak, Çarşamba
- Karamustafalı, Çarşamba
- Kaydan, Çarşamba
- Kemer, Çarşamba
- Kestanepınarı, Çarşamba
- Kızılot, Çarşamba
- Kirazbucağı, Çarşamba
- Kocakavak, Çarşamba
- Koldere, Çarşamba
- Konukluk, Çarşamba
- Köklük, Çarşamba
- Köroğlu, Çarşamba
- Kumarlı, Çarşamba
- Kumköy, Çarşamba
- Kumtepe, Çarşamba
- Kurtahmetli, Çarşamba
- Kuşçulu, Çarşamba
- Kuşhane, Çarşamba
- Kürtün, Çarşamba
- Mahmutlu, Çarşamba
- Melik, Çarşamba
- Musçalı, Çarşamba
- Namazlı, Çarşamba
- Ordubaşı, Çarşamba
- Orduköy, Çarşamba
- Otluk, Çarşamba
- Ovacık, Çarşamba
- Oymalı, Çarşamba
- Ömerli, Çarşamba
- Paşayazı, Çarşamba
- Porsuk, Çarşamba
- Sahilköy, Çarşamba
- Saraçlı, Çarşamba
- Sefalı, Çarşamba
- Selimiye, Çarşamba
- Sığırtmaç, Çarşamba
- Soğucak, Çarşamba
- Suğluca, Çarşamba
- Şenyurt, Çarşamba
- Şeyhgüven, Çarşamba
- Şeyhhabil, Çarşamba
- Taşdemir, Çarşamba
- Tatarlı, Çarşamba
- Tilkili, Çarşamba
- Turgutlu, Çarşamba
- Uluköy, Çarşamba
- Ulupınar, Çarşamba
- Ustacalı, Çarşamba
- Uzunlu, Çarşamba
- Vakıfköprü, Çarşamba
- Yağcılar, Çarşamba
- Yamanlı, Çarşamba
- Yenikaracalı, Çarşamba
- Yenikışla, Çarşamba
- Yeniköseli, Çarşamba
- Yeşilova, Çarşamba
- Yukarıdikencik, Çarşamba
- Yukarıdonurlu, Çarşamba
- Yukarıesenli, Çarşamba
- Yukarıkarabahçe, Çarşamba
- Yukarıkavacık, Çarşamba
- Zümrüt, Çarşamba

== Havza ==
- Havza
- Ağcamahmut, Havza
- Ağdırhasan, Havza
- Arslançayırı, Havza
- Aşağı Yavucak, Havza
- Aşağısusuz, Havza
- Başpelit, Havza
- Bekdiğin, Havza
- Belalan, Havza
- Beyköy, Havza
- Beyören, Havza
- Boyalı, Havza
- Celil, Havza
- Cevizlik, Havza
- Çakıralan, Havza
- Çamyatağı, Havza
- Çayırözü, Havza
- Çelikalan, Havza
- Çeltek, Havza
- Çiftlikköy, Havza
- Demiryurt, Havza
- Dereköy, Havza
- Doğançayır, Havza
- Dündarlı, Havza
- Ekinpınarı, Havza
- Elmacık, Havza
- Ereli, Havza
- Erikbelen, Havza
- Ersandık, Havza
- Esenbey, Havza
- Eymir, Havza
- Gelincik, Havza
- Gidirli, Havza
- Güvercinlik, Havza
- Hacıbattal, Havza
- Hacıdede, Havza
- Hecinli, Havza
- Hilmiye, Havza
- Ilıca, Havza
- İmircik, Havza
- Kaleköy, Havza
- Kamlık, Havza
- Karabük, Havza
- Karageçmiş, Havza
- Karahalil, Havza
- Karameşe, Havza
- Karga, Havza
- Kayabaşı, Havza
- Kayacık, Havza
- Kemaliye, Havza
- Kıroğlu, Havza
- Kirenlik, Havza
- Kocaoğlu, Havza
- Kocapınar, Havza
- Kuşkonağı, Havza
- Küflek, Havza
- Meryemdere, Havza
- Mesudiye, Havza
- Mısmılağaç, Havza
- Mürsel, Havza
- Orhaniye, Havza
- Ortaklar, Havza
- Paşapınarı, Havza
- Pınarçay, Havza
- Sivrikese, Havza
- Sofular, Havza
- Şerifali, Havza
- Şeyhali, Havza
- Şeyhkoyun, Havza
- Şeyhler, Havza
- Şeyhsafi, Havza
- Taşkaracaören, Havza
- Tekkeköy, Havza
- Tuzla, Havza
- Uluçal, Havza
- Yağcımahmut, Havza
- Yaylaçatı, Havza
- Yazıkışla, Havza
- Yenice, Havza
- Yeşilalan, Havza
- Yukarısusuz, Havza
- Yukarıyavucak, Havza

== Kavak ==
- Kavak
- Ağcakese, Kavak
- Ahırlı, Kavak
- Akbelen, Kavak
- Alaçam, Kavak
- Alaçamderesi, Kavak
- Alagömlek, Kavak
- Aşağıçirişli, Kavak
- Atayurt, Kavak
- Ayvalı, Kavak
- Azaklı, Kavak
- Başalan, Kavak
- Bayındır, Kavak
- Bayraklı, Kavak
- Bekdemir, Kavak
- Belalan, Kavak
- Beybesli, Kavak
- Beyköy, Kavak
- Boğaziçi, Kavak
- Bükceğiz, Kavak
- Büyükçukur, Kavak
- Celallı, Kavak
- Çakallı, Kavak
- Çalbaşı, Kavak
- Çarıklıbaşı, Kavak
- Çataltepe, Kavak
- Çayırlı, Kavak
- Çiçekyazı, Kavak
- Çiğdem, Kavak
- Çivril, Kavak
- Çukurbük, Kavak
- Değirmencili, Kavak
- Demirci, Kavak
- Dereköy, Kavak
- Divanbaşı, Kavak
- Doruk, Kavak
- Duman, Kavak
- Dura, Kavak
- Emirli, Kavak
- Germiyan, Kavak
- Göçebe, Kavak
- Güneyce, Kavak
- Hacılı, Kavak
- Ilıcaköy, Kavak
- İdrisli, Kavak
- İkizdere, Kavak
- Kapıhayat, Kavak
- Karacaaslan, Kavak
- Karacalar, Kavak
- Karadağ, Kavak
- Karantı, Kavak
- Karapınar, Kavak
- Karayusuflu, Kavak
- Karga, Kavak
- Karlı, Kavak
- Kayabaşı, Kavak
- Kayaköy, Kavak
- Kazancı, Kavak
- Kethuda, Kavak
- Kozansıkı, Kavak
- Köseli, Kavak
- Kurşunlu, Kavak
- Kuzalan, Kavak
- Küçükçukur, Kavak
- Mahmutbeyli, Kavak
- Mahmutlu, Kavak
- Mert, Kavak
- Muhsinli, Kavak
- Muratbeyli, Kavak
- Ortaköy, Kavak
- Saraykent, Kavak
- Sarıalan, Kavak
- Seyitali, Kavak
- Sıralı, Kavak
- Susuz, Kavak
- Şeyhli, Kavak
- Şeyhresul, Kavak
- Tabaklı, Kavak
- Talışman, Kavak
- Tatarmuslu, Kavak
- Tekkeköy, Kavak
- Tepecik, Kavak
- Toptepe, Kavak
- Üçhanlar, Kavak
- Yenigün, Kavak
- Yeralan, Kavak
- Yukarıçirişli, Kavak

== Ladik ==
- Ladik
- Ağcakaya, Ladik
- Ahmetsaray, Ladik
- Aktaş, Ladik
- Akyar, Ladik
- Alayurt, Ladik
- Alıçlı, Ladik
- Arslantaş, Ladik
- Aşağıgölyazı, Ladik
- Ayvalı, Ladik
- Ayvalısokağı, Ladik
- Başlamış, Ladik
- Budakdere, Ladik
- Büyükalan, Ladik
- Büyükkızoğlu, Ladik
- Cüce, Ladik
- Çadırkaya, Ladik
- Çakırgümüş, Ladik
- Çamlıköy, Ladik
- Daldere, Ladik
- Deliahmetoğlu, Ladik
- Derinöz, Ladik
- Doğankaş, Ladik
- Eynekaraca, Ladik
- Günkoru, Ladik
- Gürün, Ladik
- Güvenli, Ladik
- Hamamayağı, Ladik
- Hamitköy, Ladik
- Hasırcı, Ladik
- Hızarbaşı, Ladik
- İbi, Ladik
- İsasofta, Ladik
- Kabacagöz, Ladik
- Karaabdal, Ladik
- Kıranboğaz, Ladik
- Kirazpınar, Ladik
- Köseoğlu, Ladik
- Kuyucak, Ladik
- Küçükkızoğlu, Ladik
- Küpecik, Ladik
- Mazlumoğlu, Ladik
- Meşepınarı, Ladik
- Nusretli, Ladik
- Oymapınar, Ladik
- Polat, Ladik
- Salur, Ladik
- Sarıgazel, Ladik
- Sarıksızoğlu, Ladik
- Soğanlı, Ladik
- Söğütlü, Ladik
- Şeyhli, Ladik
- Tatlıcak, Ladik
- Teberoğlu, Ladik
- Yukarıgölyazı, Ladik
- Yumaklı, Ladik
- Yuvacık, Ladik

== Ondokuzmayıs ==
- Ondokuzmayıs
- Aydınpınar, Ondokuzmayıs
- Beylik, Ondokuzmayıs
- Cerekli, Ondokuzmayıs
- Çandır, Ondokuzmayıs
- Çepinler, Ondokuzmayıs
- Çetirlipınar, Ondokuzmayıs
- Çiftlikköy, Ondokuzmayıs
- Dağköy, Ondokuzmayıs
- Dereköy, Ondokuzmayıs
- Düzköy, Ondokuzmayıs
- Esentepe, Ondokuzmayıs
- Fındıklı, Ondokuzmayıs
- Hibe, Ondokuzmayıs
- Karacaoğlu, Ondokuzmayıs
- Karagöl, Ondokuzmayıs
- Kertme, Ondokuzmayıs
- Kösedik, Ondokuzmayıs
- Kuşyakası, Ondokuzmayıs
- Ormancık, Ondokuzmayıs
- Tepeköy, Ondokuzmayıs
- Yeşilköy, Ondokuzmayıs
- Yeşilyurt, Ondokuzmayıs
- Yörükler, Ondokuzmayıs

== Terme ==
- Terme
- Ahmetbey, Terme
- Akbucak, Terme
- Akçagün, Terme
- Akçay, Terme
- Akçaykaracalı, Terme
- Altunlu, Terme
- Ambartepe, Terme
- Aybeder, Terme
- Bafracalı, Terme
- Bağsaray, Terme
- Bazlamaç, Terme
- Beşikli, Terme
- Çamlıca, Terme
- Çanaklı, Terme
- Çangallar, Terme
- Çardak, Terme
- Dağdıralı, Terme
- Dereyol, Terme
- Dibekli, Terme
- Dumantepe, Terme
- Elmaköy, Terme
- Emiryusuf, Terme
- Erenköy, Terme
- Etyemezli, Terme
- Evci, Terme
- Eyercili, Terme
- Geçmiş, Terme
- Gölyazı, Terme
- Gündoğdu, Terme
- Hüseyinmescit, Terme
- İmanalisi, Terme
- Karacaköy, Terme
- Karacalı, Terme
- Karamahmut, Terme
- Karkucak, Terme
- Kazımkarabekirpaşa, Terme
- Kesikkaya, Terme
- Kocaman, Terme
- Kocamanbaşı, Terme
- Kozluk, Terme
- Köybucağı, Terme
- Kumcığaz, Terme
- Kuşculu, Terme
- Kuşça, Terme
- Mescitköy, Terme
- Meşeyazı, Terme
- Muratlı, Terme
- Oğuzlu, Terme
- Ortasöğütlü, Terme
- Örencik, Terme
- Özyurt, Terme
- Sakarlı, Terme
- Sancaklı, Terme
- Sarayköy, Terme
- Sivaslılar, Terme
- Söğütlü, Terme
- Sütözü, Terme
- Şeyhli, Terme
- Şuayip, Terme
- Taşlık, Terme
- Taşpınar, Terme
- Uludere, Terme
- Uzungazi, Terme
- Yenicami, Terme
- Yerli, Terme
- Yukarıtaşpınar, Terme
- Yüksekyayla, Terme

== Salıpazarı ==
- Salıpazarı
- Alan, Salıpazarı
- Avut, Salıpazarı
- Biçme, Salıpazarı
- Cevizli, Salıpazarı
- Çağlayan, Salıpazarı
- Çiçekli, Salıpazarı
- Dikencik, Salıpazarı
- Esatçiftliği, Salıpazarı
- Fatsalılar, Salıpazarı
- Fındıklı, Salıpazarı
- Fidancık, Salıpazarı
- Gökçebaşı, Salıpazarı
- Güzelvatan, Salıpazarı
- Kalfalı, Salıpazarı
- Karacaören, Salıpazarı
- Karadere, Salıpazarı
- Karaman, Salıpazarı
- Karayonca, Salıpazarı
- Kırgıl, Salıpazarı
- Kızılot, Salıpazarı
- Kocalar, Salıpazarı
- Konakören, Salıpazarı
- Kuşcuğaz, Salıpazarı
- Muslubey, Salıpazarı
- Suluca, Salıpazarı
- Tacalan, Salıpazarı
- Tahnal, Salıpazarı
- Tepealtı, Salıpazarı
- Yavaşbey, Salıpazarı
- Yayla, Salıpazarı
- Yenidoğan, Salıpazarı
- Yeşil, Salıpazarı
- Yukarıkestanepınarı, Salıpazarı

== Vezirköprü ==
- Vezirköprü
- Adatepe, Vezirköprü
- Ağcaalan, Vezirköprü
- Ağcayazı, Vezirköprü
- Ahmetbaba, Vezirköprü
- Akören, Vezirköprü
- Alan, Vezirköprü
- Alanbaşı, Vezirköprü
- Alancık, Vezirköprü
- Alanşeyhi, Vezirköprü
- Altınkaya, Vezirköprü
- Arıca, Vezirköprü
- Avdan, Vezirköprü
- Aydınlı, Vezirköprü
- Aydoğdu, Vezirköprü
- Ayvalı, Vezirköprü
- Bahçekonak, Vezirköprü
- Bahçesaray, Vezirköprü
- Bakla, Vezirköprü
- Başalan, Vezirköprü
- Başfakı, Vezirköprü
- Bayram, Vezirköprü
- Bektaş, Vezirköprü
- Belalan, Vezirköprü
- Beşpınar, Vezirköprü
- Boğa, Vezirköprü
- Boğazkoru, Vezirköprü
- Boruk, Vezirköprü
- Burhaniye, Vezirköprü
- Büyükkale, Vezirköprü
- Cebeli, Vezirköprü
- Çakırtaş, Vezirköprü
- Çal, Vezirköprü
- Çalman, Vezirköprü
- Çaltu, Vezirköprü
- Çamlıca, Vezirköprü
- Çamlıkonak, Vezirköprü
- Çekalan, Vezirköprü
- Çekmeden, Vezirköprü
- Çeltek, Vezirköprü
- Çorakdere, Vezirköprü
- Danabaş, Vezirköprü
- Darıçay, Vezirköprü
- Darıçayalanı, Vezirköprü
- Devalan, Vezirköprü
- Doyran, Vezirköprü
- Duruçay, Vezirköprü
- Elaldı, Vezirköprü
- Elbeyi, Vezirköprü
- Elmalı, Vezirköprü
- Esen, Vezirköprü
- Esentepe, Vezirköprü
- Esenyurt, Vezirköprü
- Göl, Vezirköprü
- Göllüalan, Vezirköprü
- Gömlekhisar, Vezirköprü
- Güder, Vezirköprü
- Güldere, Vezirköprü
- Habipkakı, Vezirköprü
- Hacılı, Vezirköprü
- Halilbaba, Vezirköprü
- Halkahavlı, Vezirköprü
- Hayranlı, Vezirköprü
- İmircik, Vezirköprü
- İncesu, Vezirköprü
- İnkaya, Vezirköprü
- Kabalı, Vezirköprü
- Kadıçayırı, Vezirköprü
- Kadıoğlu, Vezirköprü
- Kapaklı, Vezirköprü
- Kapaklıçeşme, Vezirköprü
- Kaplancık, Vezirköprü
- Karabük, Vezirköprü
- Karacaören, Vezirköprü
- Karadoruk, Vezirköprü
- Karaköy, Vezirköprü
- Karanar, Vezirköprü
- Karapınar, Vezirköprü
- Karkucak, Vezirköprü
- Karlı, Vezirköprü
- Kavakpınarı, Vezirköprü
- Kılıçgüney, Vezirköprü
- Kıranalan, Vezirköprü
- Kıratbükü, Vezirköprü
- Kırma, Vezirköprü
- Kızılcakoru, Vezirköprü
- Kızılcaören, Vezirköprü
- Kızılkese, Vezirköprü
- Kocakaya, Vezirköprü
- Kovalı, Vezirköprü
- Köprübaşı, Vezirköprü
- Kumral, Vezirköprü
- Kuruçay, Vezirköprü
- Kuşçular, Vezirköprü
- Kuyaş, Vezirköprü
- Kuyumcular, Vezirköprü
- Küçükkale, Vezirköprü
- Kületek, Vezirköprü
- Mahmatlı, Vezirköprü
- Melikli, Vezirköprü
- Meşeli, Vezirköprü
- Mezraa, Vezirköprü
- Narlısaray, Vezirköprü
- Orta, Vezirköprü
- Oruç, Vezirköprü
- Ovacık, Vezirköprü
- Oymaağaç, Vezirköprü
- Öğürlü, Vezirköprü
- Örencik, Vezirköprü
- Özyörük, Vezirköprü
- Paşa, Vezirköprü
- Pazarcı, Vezirköprü
- Samukalan, Vezirköprü
- Samur, Vezirköprü
- Saraycık, Vezirköprü
- Sarıalan, Vezirköprü
- Sarıdibek, Vezirköprü
- Sarıyar, Vezirköprü
- Sırbaşmak, Vezirköprü
- Sofular, Vezirköprü
- Soğucak, Vezirköprü
- Susuz, Vezirköprü
- Şentepe, Vezirköprü
- Tahtaköprü, Vezirköprü
- Taşlıyük, Vezirköprü
- Tatarkale, Vezirköprü
- Teberük, Vezirköprü
- Tekkekıran, Vezirköprü
- Tepeören, Vezirköprü
- Türkmen, Vezirköprü
- Yağcı, Vezirköprü
- Yağınözü, Vezirköprü
- Yarbaşı, Vezirköprü
- Yeniçelik, Vezirköprü
- Yenidüzce, Vezirköprü
- Yeşiltepe, Vezirköprü
- Yolpınar, Vezirköprü
- Yukarınarlı, Vezirköprü
- Yurtdağı, Vezirköprü
- Yürükçal, Vezirköprü

== Yalakent ==
- Yakakent
- Asmapınar, Yakakent
- Büyükkırık, Yakakent
- Çamalan, Yakakent
- Çepni, Yakakent
- Gündüzlü, Yakakent
- Karaaba, Yakakent
- Kayalı, Yakakent
- Kuzören, Yakakent
- Küplüağzı, Yakakent
- Mutaflı, Yakakent
- Sarıgöl, Yakakent
- Yeşilköy, Yakakent
- Yassıdağ, Yakakent
