= List of municipalities in Samsun Province =

This is a list of municipalities in Samsun Province, Turkey as of October 2007.

== Municipalities ==
List is sorted alphabetically A-Z, as Districts->Municipalities.

District	Municipality
19 Mayıs	19 Mayıs
19 Mayıs	Dereköy
19 Mayıs	Yörükler
Alaçam	Alaçam
Asarcık	Asarcık
Ayvacık	Ayvacık
Bafra	Bafra
Bafra	Çetinkaya
Bafra	Doğanca
Bafra	İkizpınar
Bafra	Kolay
Çarşamba	Ağcagüney
Çarşamba	Çarşamba
Çarşamba	Çınarlık
Çarşamba	Dikbıyık
Çarşamba	Hürriyet
Havza	Bekdiğin
Havza	Havza
Havza	Ilıca
Kavak	Kavak
Ladik	Ladik
Salıpazarı	Salıpazarı
Samsun (Merkez)	Altınkum
Samsun	Atakent
Samsun	Atakum
Samsun	Canik
Samsun	Çatalçam
Samsun	Gazi
Samsun	İlkadım
Samsun	Kurupelit
Samsun	Taflan
Samsun	Yeşilkent
Tekkeköy	Aşağıçinik
Tekkeköy	Büyüklü
Tekkeköy	Kutlukent
Tekkeköy	Tekkeköy
Terme	Ambartepe
Terme	Bazlamaç
Terme	Evci
Terme	Gölyazı
Terme	Hüseyinmescit
Terme	Kocaman
Terme	Kozluk
Terme	Sakarlı
Terme	Söğütlü
Terme	Terme
Vezirköprü	Göl
Vezirköprü	Narlısaray
Vezirköprü	Vezirköprü
Yakakent	Yakakent

== Changes in 2014 ==
According to Law act no 6360, belde (town) municipalities within provinces with more than 750000 population (so called Metropolitan municipalities in Turkey) were abolished as of 30 March 2014. 23 belde municipalities in the above list are now defunct. The list is kept for historical reference.
