= Ağcayazı =

Ağcayazı is a Turkic word that may refer to several places:

== Azerbaijan ==
- Ağcayazı, Lachin, a village in Lachin Rayon
- Yuxarı Ağcayazı (Upper Ağcayazı), a village and municipality in Agdash Rayon
  - Aşağı Ağcayazı (Lower Ağcayazı), a village in the municipality

== Turkey ==
- Ağcayazı, Vezirköprü, a village in the Vezirköprü district of Samsun Province, Turkey
