= Ağcayazı, Agdash =

Ağcayazı, Agdash may refer to:

- Aşağı Ağcayazı
- Yuxarı Ağcayazı
