= Çaltı (disambiguation) =

Çaltı (literally "thorny tree" or just "thorn") is a Turkish word that may refer to several places in Turkey:

- Çaltı, a town in the district of Söğüt, Bilecik Province
- Çaltı, Ayvacık
- Çaltı, Çardak
- Çaltı, Çine, a village in the district of Çine, Aydın Province
- Çaltı, Gündoğmuş, a village in the district of Gündoğmuş, Antalya Province
- Çaltı, İliç
- Çaltı, Kumluca, a village in the district of Kumluca, Antalya Province
- Çaltı, Refahiye
- Çaltı, Vezirköprü, a village in the district of Vezirköprü, Samsun Province
