= Elbeyi =

Elbeyi may refer to:

- Elbeyi Guliyev (born 1995), Azerbaijani footballer
- Elbeyi, Kâhta, village in Turkey
- Elbeyi, Vezirköprü, neighborhood in Turkey
