= Alanbaşı =

Alanbaşı (literally "head of the area") is a Turkish place name that may refer to the following places in Turkey:

- Alanbaşı, Vezirköprü, a village in the district of Vezirköprü, Samsun Province
- Alanbaşı, Yusufeli, a village in the district of Yusufeli, Artvin Province
