= Bayramköy, Vezirköprü =

Bayramköy
- Neighbourhood
- Location in Turkey
- Coordinates: 41.0635°N 35.5600°E
- Country: Turkey
- Province: Samsun
- District: Vezirköprü
- Population (2022): 315
- Time zone: UTC+3 (TRT)

Bayramköy is a neighbourhood in the municipality and district of Vezirköprü, Samsun Province, in Turkey. As of 2022, its population is 315.
