= Bahçesaray =

The name Bahçesaray comes from Persian باغچه سرای bāghche-sarāy which means the Garden Palace. It may refer to:

== Places ==
=== Turkey ===
- Bahçesaray, Van, a district and municipality of Van Province
- Bahçesaray, Vezirköprü, a village in the district of Vezirköprü, Samsun Province

=== Crimea ===
- Bakhchysarai, a city in Crimea
