= Tekkekıranı, Vezirköprü =

Tekkekıranı
- Neighbourhood
- Country: Turkey
- Province: Samsun
- District: Vezirköprü
- Population (2022): 156
- Time zone: UTC+3 (TRT)

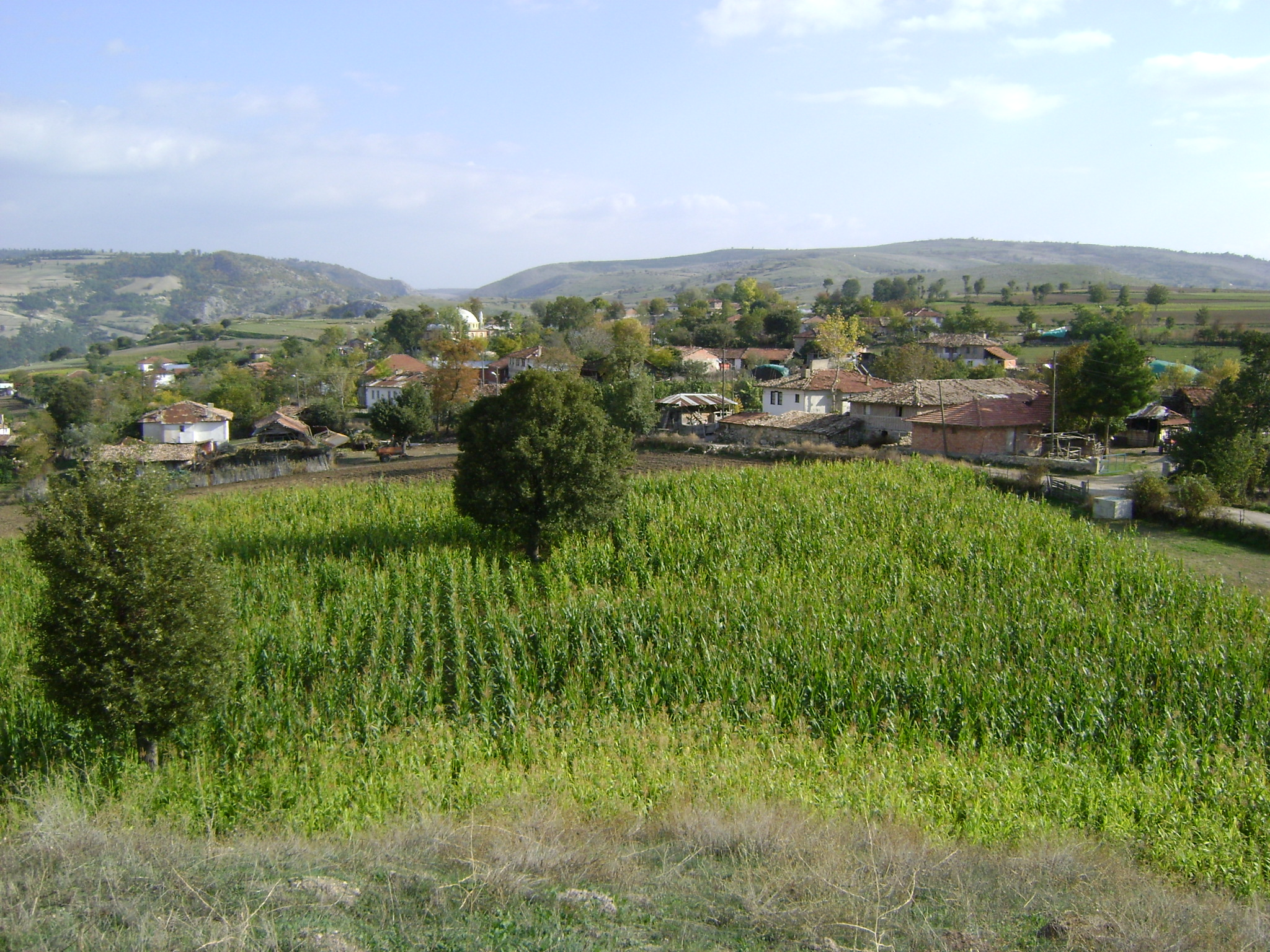
Tekkekıranı, Vezirköprü

Tekkekıranı is a neighbourhood in the municipality and district of Vezirköprü, Samsun Province, Turkey. Its population is 156 (2022).
