= Alanköy, Vezirköprü =

Alanköy
- Neighbourhood
- Location in Turkey
- Coordinates: 41°8′6″N 35°8′6″E
- Country: Turkey
- Province: Samsun
- District: Vezirköprü
- Population (2022): 543
- Time zone: UTC+3 (TRT)

Alanköy (also: Alan) is a neighbourhood in the municipality and district of Vezirköprü, Samsun Province, Turkey. Its population is 543 (2022).
