= Habibfakı, Vezirköprü =

Habibfakı
- Neighbourhood
- Location in Turkey
- Coordinates: 41.16915°N 35.19652°E
- Country: Turkey
- Province: Samsun
- District: Vezirköprü
- Population (2022): 1,306
- Time zone: UTC+3 (TRT)

Habibfakı is a neighbourhood in the municipality and district of Vezirköprü, Samsun Province, Turkey. Its population is 1,306 (2022).
