= Sürmeli =

Sürmeli, Surmalu, or other variants may refer to:

== Administrative divisions ==
- Surmalu uezd, a county of the Russian Empire 1828–1918

== Settlements ==
- Sormahlu, Iran
- Sürmeli, Mudurnu, Turkey
- Sürmeli, Tuzluca, Iğdır Province, Turkey
- Sürmeli, Bafra, a populated place in Samsun Province, Turkey

== People ==
- Ali Sürmeli (born 1959), Turkish actor
- Kürşad Sürmeli (born 1995), Dutch footballer
- Sürmeli Ali Pasha (c. 1645–1695), Ottoman statesman
