= Kuyumcu =

Kuyumcu can refer to:

- Kuyumcu, Burhaniye
- Kuyumcu, Çubuk
- Kuyumcu, Laçin
- Kuyumcu, Vezirköprü
