= Çalköy, Vezirköprü =

Çalköy
- Neighbourhood
- Location in Turkey
- Coordinates: 41.1500°N 35.5167°E
- Country: Turkey
- Province: Samsun
- District: Vezirköprü
- Population (2022): 372
- Time zone: UTC+3 (TRT)

Çalköy is a neighbourhood in the municipality and district of Vezirköprü, Samsun Province, Turkey. Its population is 372 (2022).
