= Paşaköy =

Paşaköy is a Turkish word meaning "village of the pasha" and may refer to:

== Villages in Turkey ==
- Paşaköy, Alanya, Antalya Province
- Paşaköy, Ayvacık, Çanakkale Province
- Paşaköy, Çankırı, Çankırı Province
- Paşaköy, Çorum, Çorum Province
- Paşaköy, İpsala
- Paşaköy, Taşköprü, Kastamonu province
- Paşaköy, Vezirköprü, Samsun Province
- Paşaköy, Yenipazar, Aydın Province
- Paşaköy, Yüreğir, Adana Province

== Villages elsewhere ==
- Paşaköy or Assia, Cyprus, village in Famagusta district, Cyprus
