= Duruçay =

Duruçay (literally "clear creek") is a Turkish place name that may refer to the following places in Turkey:

- Duruçay, Kastamonu, a village in the Kastamonu district of Kastamonu Province
- Duruçay, Vezirköprü, a village in the Vezirköprü district of Samsun Province
