= Boğaköy, Vezirköprü =

Boğaköy
- Neighbourhood
- Location in Turkey
- Coordinates: 41.1120°N 35.4272°E
- Country: Turkey
- Province: Samsun
- District: Vezirköprü
- Population (2022): 477
- Time zone: UTC+3 (TRT)

Boğaköy is a neighbourhood in the municipality and district of Vezirköprü, Samsun Province, Turkey. Its population is 477 (2022).
