= Sarıyar, Vezirköprü =

Sarıyar
- Neighbourhood
- Location in Turkey
- Coordinates: 41.0817°N 35.4527°E
- Country: Turkey
- Province: Samsun
- District: Vezirköprü
- Population (2022): 108
- Time zone: UTC+3 (TRT)

Sarıyar is a neighbourhood in the municipality and district of Vezirköprü, Samsun Province, Turkey. Its population is 108 (2022).
