= Başalan, Vezirköprü =

Başalan
- Neighbourhood
- Location in Turkey
- Coordinates: 41.0799°N 35.3665°E
- Country: Turkey
- Province: Samsun
- District: Vezirköprü
- Population (2022): 239
- Time zone: UTC+3 (TRT)

Başalan is a neighbourhood in the municipality and district of Vezirköprü, Samsun Province, Turkey. Its population is 239 (2022).
