= Kadıçayırı, Vezirköprü =

Kadıçayırı
- Neighbourhood
- Location in Turkey
- Coordinates: 41.0558°N 35.4299°E
- Country: Turkey
- Province: Samsun
- District: Vezirköprü
- Population (2022): 27
- Time zone: UTC+3 (TRT)

Kadıçayırı is a neighbourhood in the municipality and district of Vezirköprü, Samsun Province, Turkey. Its population is 27 (2022).
