= Şentepe, Vezirköprü =

Şentepe
- Neighbourhood
- Location in Turkey
- Coordinates: 41.2175°N 35.1886°E
- Country: Turkey
- Province: Samsun
- District: Vezirköprü
- Population (2022): 276
- Time zone: UTC+3 (TRT)

Şentepe is a neighbourhood in the municipality and district of Vezirköprü, Samsun Province, Turkey. Its population is 276 (2022).
