= Samukalan, Vezirköprü =

Samukalan
- Neighbourhood
- Location in Turkey
- Coordinates: 41°09′N 35°18′E
- Country: Turkey
- Province: Samsun
- District: Vezirköprü
- Population (2022): 526
- Time zone: UTC+3 (TRT)

Samukalan is a neighbourhood in the municipality and district of Vezirköprü, Samsun Province, Turkey. Its population is 526 (2022).
