= Kapaklı, Vezirköprü =

Kapaklı
- Neighbourhood
- Location in Turkey
- Coordinates: 41.1061°N 35.3939°E
- Country: Turkey
- Province: Samsun
- District: Vezirköprü
- Population (2022): 369
- Time zone: UTC+3 (TRT)

Kapaklı is a neighbourhood in the municipality and district of Vezirköprü, Samsun Province, Turkey. Its population is 369 (2022).
