= Arıca, Vezirköprü =

Arıca
- Neighbourhood
- Location in Turkey
- Coordinates: 41.1416°N 35.3743°E
- Country: Turkey
- Province: Samsun
- District: Vezirköprü
- Population (2022): 609
- Time zone: UTC+3 (TRT)

Arıca is a neighbourhood in the municipality and district of Vezirköprü, Samsun Province, Turkey. Its population is 609 (2022).
