= Yarbaşı, Vezirköprü =

Yarbaşı
- Neighbourhood
- Country: Turkey
- Province: Samsun
- District: Vezirköprü
- Population (2021): 11
- Time zone: UTC+3 (TRT)

Yarbaşı is a neighbourhood in the municipality and district of Vezirköprü, Samsun Province, Turkey. Its population is 11 (2021).
