= Ağcaalan, Vezirköprü =

Ağcaalan
- Neighbourhood
- Location in Turkey
- Coordinates: 41.0778°N 35.5364°E
- Country: Turkey
- Province: Samsun
- District: Vezirköprü
- Population (2022): 39
- Time zone: UTC+3 (TRT)

Ağcaalan is a neighbourhood in the municipality and district of Vezirköprü, Samsun Province, Turkey. Its population is 39 (2022). The quarter is mostly inhabited by Abkhazians, with other Northwest Caucasian groups present.
