= Tatarkale, Vezirköprü =

Tatarkale
- Neighbourhood
- Location in Turkey
- Coordinates: 41°08′N 35°36′E
- Country: Turkey
- Province: Samsun
- District: Vezirköprü
- Population (2022): 119
- Time zone: UTC+3 (TRT)

Tatarkale is a neighbourhood in the municipality and district of Vezirköprü, Samsun Province, Turkey. Its population is 119 (2022).
