= Kılıçgüney, Vezirköprü =

Kılıçgüney
- Neighbourhood
- Location in Turkey
- Coordinates: 41°06′05″N 35°18′00″E
- Country: Turkey
- Province: Samsun
- District: Vezirköprü
- Population (2022): 292
- Time zone: UTC+3 (TRT)

Kılıçgüney is a neighbourhood in the municipality and district of Vezirköprü, Samsun Province, Turkey. Its population is 292 (2022).
