= Yağcı, Vezirköprü =

Yağcı
- Neighbourhood
- Location in Turkey
- Coordinates: 41.1051°N 35.5195°E
- Country: Turkey
- Province: Samsun
- District: Vezirköprü
- Population (2022): 651
- Time zone: UTC+3 (TRT)

Yağcı is a neighbourhood in the municipality and district of Vezirköprü, Samsun Province, Turkey. Its population is 651 (2022).
