= Karaköy, Vezirköprü =

Karaköy
- Neighbourhood
- Location in Turkey
- Coordinates: 41.1438°N 35.1132°E
- Country: Turkey
- Province: Samsun
- District: Vezirköprü
- Population (2022): 558
- Time zone: UTC+3 (TRT)

Karaköy is a neighbourhood in the municipality and district of Vezirköprü, Samsun Province, Turkey. Its population is 558 (2022).
