= Karlı, Vezirköprü =

Karlı
- Neighbourhood
- Country: Turkey
- Province: Samsun
- District: Vezirköprü
- Population (2022): 228
- Time zone: UTC+3 (TRT)

Karlı is a neighbourhood in the municipality and district of Vezirköprü, Samsun Province, Turkey. Its population is 228 (2022).
