= Susuz, Vezirköprü =

Susuz
- Neighbourhood
- Location in Turkey
- Coordinates: 41.3101°N 34.9650°E
- Country: Turkey
- Province: Samsun
- District: Vezirköprü
- Population (2022): 660
- Time zone: UTC+3 (TRT)

Susuz is a neighbourhood in the municipality and district of Vezirköprü, Samsun Province, Turkey. Its population is 660 (2022).
