= Kocakaya, Vezirköprü =

Kocakaya
- Neighbourhood
- Location in Turkey
- Coordinates: 41°18′N 35°07′E
- Country: Turkey
- Province: Samsun
- District: Vezirköprü
- Population (2022): 179
- Time zone: UTC+3 (TRT)

Kocakaya is a neighbourhood in the municipality and district of Vezirköprü, Samsun Province, Turkey. Its population is 179 (2022).
