= Kabalı, Vezirköprü =

Kabalı
- Neighbourhood
- Location in Turkey
- Coordinates: 41.2155°N 35.5589°E
- Country: Turkey
- Province: Samsun
- District: Vezirköprü
- Population (2022): 543
- Time zone: UTC+3 (TRT)

Kabalı is a neighbourhood in the municipality and district of Vezirköprü, Samsun Province, Turkey. Its population is 543 (2022).
