= Tahtaköprü, Vezirköprü =

Tahtaköprü
- Neighbourhood
- Location in Turkey
- Coordinates: 41.1013°N 35.0007°E
- Country: Turkey
- Province: Samsun
- District: Vezirköprü
- Population (2022): 1,848
- Time zone: UTC+3 (TRT)

Tahtaköprü is a neighbourhood in the municipality and district of Vezirköprü, Samsun Province, Turkey. Its population is 1,848 (2022).
