= Kuyaş, Vezirköprü =

Kuyaş
- Neighbourhood
- Location in Turkey
- Coordinates: 41°07′N 35°24′E
- Country: Turkey
- Province: Samsun
- District: Vezirköprü
- Population (2022): 111
- Time zone: UTC+3 (TRT)

Kuyaş is a neighbourhood in the municipality and district of Vezirköprü, Samsun Province, Turkey. Its population is 111 (2022).
