= Çakırtaş, Vezirköprü =

Çakırtaş
- Neighbourhood
- Location in Turkey
- Coordinates: 41.1345°N 35.4881°E
- Country: Turkey
- Province: Samsun
- District: Vezirköprü
- Population (2022): 361
- Time zone: UTC+3 (TRT)

Çakırtaş is a neighbourhood in the municipality and district of Vezirköprü, Samsun Province, Turkey. Its population is 361 (2022).
