= İnkaya, Vezirköprü =

İnkaya
- Neighbourhood
- Location in Turkey
- Coordinates: 41.1810°N 35.3461°E
- Country: Turkey
- Province: Samsun
- District: Vezirköprü
- Population (2022): 480
- Time zone: UTC+3 (TRT)

İnkaya is a neighbourhood in the municipality and district of Vezirköprü, Samsun Province, Turkey. Its population is 480 (2022).
