= Cebeli, Vezirköprü =

Cebeli
- Neighbourhood
- Location in Turkey
- Coordinates: 41.1182°N 35.3035°E
- Country: Turkey
- Province: Samsun
- District: Vezirköprü
- Population (2022): 439
- Time zone: UTC+3 (TRT)

Cebeli is a neighbourhood in the municipality and district of Vezirköprü, Samsun Province, Turkey. Its population is 439 (2022).
