= Sofular, Vezirköprü =

Sofular
- Neighbourhood
- Location in Turkey
- Coordinates: 41.1587°N 35.0997°E
- Country: Turkey
- Province: Samsun
- District: Vezirköprü
- Population (2022): 511
- Time zone: UTC+3 (TRT)

Sofular is a neighbourhood in the municipality and district of Vezirköprü, Samsun Province, Turkey. Its population is 511 (2022).
