= Meşeli, Vezirköprü =

Meşeli
- Neighbourhood
- Location in Turkey
- Coordinates: 41.0847°N 35.5022°E
- Country: Turkey
- Province: Samsun
- District: Vezirköprü
- Population (2022): 584
- Time zone: UTC+3 (TRT)

Meşeli is a neighbourhood in the municipality and district of Vezirköprü, Samsun Province, Turkey. Its population is 584 (2022).
