= Altınkaya, Vezirköprü =

Altınkaya
- Neighbourhood
- Location in Turkey
- Coordinates: 41.3314°N 35.3703°E
- Country: Turkey
- Province: Samsun
- District: Vezirköprü
- Population (2022): 158
- Time zone: UTC+3 (TRT)

Altınkaya is a neighbourhood in the municipality and district of Vezirköprü, Samsun Province, Turkey. Its population is 158 (2022).
