= Karacaören, Vezirköprü =

Karacaören
- Neighbourhood
- Location in Turkey
- Coordinates: 41.1327°N 35.5140°E
- Country: Turkey
- Province: Samsun
- District: Vezirköprü
- Population (2022): 190
- Time zone: UTC+3 (TRT)

Karacaören is a neighbourhood in the municipality and district of Vezirköprü, Samsun Province, Turkey. Its population is 190 (2022).
