= Kumral, Vezirköprü =

Kumral
- Neighbourhood
- Location in Turkey
- Coordinates: 41°16′N 35°08′E
- Country: Turkey
- Province: Samsun
- District: Vezirköprü
- Population (2022): 552
- Time zone: UTC+3 (TRT)

Kumral is a neighbourhood in the municipality and district of Vezirköprü, Samsun Province, Turkey. Its population is 552 (2022).
