= Soğucak, Vezirköprü =

Soğucak
- Neighbourhood
- Location in Turkey
- Coordinates: 41.0833°N 35.2000°E
- Country: Turkey
- Province: Samsun
- District: Vezirköprü
- Population (2022): 320
- Time zone: UTC+3 (TRT)

Soğucak is a neighbourhood in the municipality and district of Vezirköprü, Samsun Province, Turkey. Its population is 320 (2022).
