= Türkmen, Vezirköprü =

Türkmen
- Neighbourhood
- Location in Turkey
- Coordinates: 41.2516°N 35.4433°E
- Country: Turkey
- Province: Samsun
- District: Vezirköprü
- Population (2022): 497
- Time zone: UTC+3 (TRT)

Türkmen is a neighbourhood in the municipality and district of Vezirköprü, Samsun Province, Turkey. Its population is 497 (2022).
