= Halilbaba, Vezirköprü =

Halilbaba
- Neighbourhood
- Location in Turkey
- Coordinates: 41°07′N 35°17′E
- Country: Turkey
- Province: Samsun
- District: Vezirköprü
- Population (2022): 174
- Time zone: UTC+3 (TRT)

Halilbaba is a neighbourhood in the municipality and district of Vezirköprü, Samsun Province, Turkey. Its population is 174 (2022).
