= Kavakpınarı, Vezirköprü =

Kavakpınarı
- Neighbourhood
- Location in Turkey
- Coordinates: 41.0938°N 35.4331°E
- Country: Turkey
- Province: Samsun
- District: Vezirköprü
- Population (2022): 30
- Time zone: UTC+3 (TRT)

Kavakpınarı is a neighbourhood in the municipality and district of Vezirköprü, Samsun Province, Turkey. Its population is 30 (2022).
