= Aydınlı, Vezirköprü =

Aydınlı
- Neighbourhood
- Location in Turkey
- Coordinates: 41.0798°N 35.3991°E
- Country: Turkey
- Province: Samsun
- District: Vezirköprü
- Population (2022): 145
- Time zone: UTC+3 (TRT)

Aydınlı is a neighbourhood in the municipality and district of Vezirköprü, Samsun Province, Turkey. Its population is 145 (2022).
