= Paşaköy, Vezirköprü =

Paşaköy
- Neighbourhood
- Location in Turkey
- Coordinates: 41.0944°N 35.4012°E
- Country: Turkey
- Province: Samsun
- District: Vezirköprü
- Population (2022): 575
- Time zone: UTC+3 (TRT)

Paşaköy is a neighbourhood in the municipality and district of Vezirköprü, Samsun Province, Turkey. Its population is 575 (2022).
