= Yurtdağı, Vezirköprü =

Yurtdağı
- Neighbourhood
- Location in Turkey
- Coordinates: 41°06′N 35°23′E
- Country: Turkey
- Province: Samsun
- District: Vezirköprü
- Population (2022): 104
- Time zone: UTC+3 (TRT)

Yurtdağı is a neighbourhood in the municipality and district of Vezirköprü, Samsun Province, Turkey. Its population is 104 (2022).
