= Darıçayalanı, Vezirköprü =

Darıçayalanı
- Neighbourhood
- Country: Turkey
- Province: Samsun
- District: Vezirköprü
- Population (2022): 201
- Time zone: UTC+3 (TRT)

Darıçayalanı is a neighbourhood in the municipality and district of Vezirköprü, Samsun Province, Turkey. Its population is 201 (2022).

It was separated from the village of Darıçay in 1958. It is located to the southwest of Darıçay. It is 85 km to Vezirköprü and 195 km to province of Samsun.
