= Burhaniye, Vezirköprü =

Burhaniye
- Neighbourhood
- Location in Turkey
- Coordinates: 41.1223°N 35.3113°E
- Country: Turkey
- Province: Samsun
- District: Vezirköprü
- Population (2022): 71
- Time zone: UTC+3 (TRT)

Burhaniye is a neighbourhood in the municipality and district of Vezirköprü, Samsun Province, Turkey. Its population is 71 (2022).
