= Büyükkale, Vezirköprü =

Büyükkale
- Neighbourhood
- Location in Turkey
- Coordinates: 41°3′47″N 35°21′50″E
- Country: Turkey
- Province: Samsun
- District: Vezirköprü
- Population (2022): 235
- Time zone: UTC+3 (TRT)

Büyükkale is a neighbourhood in the municipality and district of Vezirköprü, Samsun Province, Turkey. Its population is 235 (2022).
