= Kızılkese, Vezirköprü =

Kızılkese
- Neighbourhood
- Location in Turkey
- Coordinates: 41.3098°N 35.0302°E
- Country: Turkey
- Province: Samsun
- District: Vezirköprü
- Population (2022): 244
- Time zone: UTC+3 (TRT)

Kızılkese is a neighbourhood in the municipality and district of Vezirköprü, Samsun Province, Turkey. Its population is 244 (2022).
