= Boruk, Vezirköprü =

Boruk
- Neighbourhood
- Location in Turkey
- Coordinates: 41.0873°N 35.3481°E
- Country: Turkey
- Province: Samsun
- District: Vezirköprü
- Population (2022): 832
- Time zone: UTC+3 (TRT)

Boruk is a neighbourhood in the municipality and district of Vezirköprü, Samsun Province, Turkey. Its population is 832 (2022).
