= Kadıoğlu, Vezirköprü =

Kadıoğlu
- Neighbourhood
- Location in Turkey
- Coordinates: 41.205°N 35.129°E
- Country: Turkey
- Province: Samsun
- District: Vezirköprü
- Population (2022): 166
- Time zone: UTC+3 (TRT)

Kadıoğlu is a neighbourhood in the municipality and district of Vezirköprü, Samsun Province, Turkey. Its population is 166 (2022).
