= Devalan, Vezirköprü =

Devalan
- Neighbourhood
- Country: Turkey
- Province: Samsun
- District: Vezirköprü
- Population (2022): 694
- Time zone: UTC+3 (TRT)

Devalan is a neighbourhood in the municipality and district of Vezirköprü, Samsun Province, Turkey. Its population is 694 (2022).
