= Esenyurt, Vezirköprü =

Esenyurt
- Neighbourhood
- Location in Turkey
- Coordinates: 41.0964°N 35.5574°E
- Country: Turkey
- Province: Samsun
- District: Vezirköprü
- Population (2022): 142
- Time zone: UTC+3 (TRT)

Esenyurt is a neighbourhood in the municipality and district of Vezirköprü, Samsun Province, Turkey. Its population is 142 (2022).
