= Karanar, Vezirköprü =

Karanar
- Neighbourhood
- Location in Turkey
- Coordinates: 41.2349°N 35.2370°E
- Country: Turkey
- Province: Samsun
- District: Vezirköprü
- Population (2022): 213
- Time zone: UTC+3 (TRT)

Karanar is a neighbourhood in the municipality and district of Vezirköprü, Samsun Province, Turkey. Its population is 213 (2022).
