= Teberük, Vezirköprü =

Teberük
- Neighbourhood
- Location in Turkey
- Coordinates: 41°05′N 35°26′E
- Country: Turkey
- Province: Samsun
- District: Vezirköprü
- Population (2022): 304
- Time zone: UTC+3 (TRT)

Teberük is a neighbourhood in the district of Vezirköprü, Samsun Province, Turkey. Its population is 304 (2022).
