= Beşpınar, Vezirköprü =

Beşpınar
- Neighbourhood
- Location in Turkey
- Coordinates: 41.1382°N 35.2172°E
- Country: Turkey
- Province: Samsun
- District: Vezirköprü
- Population (2022): 1,012
- Time zone: UTC+3 (TRT)

Beşpınar is a neighbourhood in the municipality and district of Vezirköprü, Samsun Province, Turkey. Its population is 1,012 (2022).
