= Sırbaşmak, Vezirköprü =

Sırbaşmak
- Neighbourhood
- Location in Turkey
- Coordinates: 41°10′N 35°09′E
- Country: Turkey
- Province: Samsun
- District: Vezirköprü
- Population (2022): 496
- Time zone: UTC+3 (TRT)

Sırbaşmak is a neighbourhood in the municipality and district of Vezirköprü, Samsun Province, Turkey. Its population is 496 (2022).
