= Bahçekonak, Vezirköprü =

Bahçekonak
- Neighbourhood
- Location in Turkey
- Coordinates: 41°06′N 35°33′E
- Country: Turkey
- Province: Samsun
- District: Vezirköprü
- Population (2022): 956
- Time zone: UTC+3 (TRT)

Bahçekonak is a neighbourhood in the municipality and district of Vezirköprü, Samsun Province, Turkey. Its population is 956 (2022).
