= Kızılcaören, Vezirköprü =

Kızılcaören
- Neighbourhood
- Location in Turkey
- Coordinates: 41.1015°N 35.4984°E
- Country: Turkey
- Province: Samsun
- District: Vezirköprü
- Population (2022): 323
- Time zone: UTC+3 (TRT)

Kızılcaören is a neighbourhood in the municipality and district of Vezirköprü, Samsun Province, Turkey. Its population is 323 (2022).
