= Belalan, Vezirköprü =

Belalan
- Neighbourhood
- Location in Turkey
- Coordinates: 41.2375°N 35.0638°E
- Country: Turkey
- Province: Samsun
- District: Vezirköprü
- Population (2022): 274
- Time zone: UTC+3 (TRT)

Belalan is a neighbourhood in the municipality and district of Vezirköprü, Samsun Province, Turkey. Its population is 274 (2022).
