= Esen, Vezirköprü =

Esen
- Neighbourhood
- Location in Turkey
- Coordinates: 41.1034°N 35.3473°E
- Country: Turkey
- Province: Samsun
- District: Vezirköprü
- Population (2022): 608
- Time zone: UTC+3 (TRT)

Esen is a neighbourhood in the municipality and district of Vezirköprü, Samsun Province, Turkey. Its population is 608 (2022).
