= Güldere, Vezirköprü =

Güldere
- Neighbourhood
- Location in Turkey
- Coordinates: 41.1833°N 35.5667°E
- Country: Turkey
- Province: Samsun
- District: Vezirköprü
- Population (2022): 177
- Time zone: UTC+3 (TRT)

Güldere is a neighbourhood in the municipality and district of Vezirköprü, Samsun Province, Turkey. Its population is 177 (2022).
