= Mezraa, Vezirköprü =

Mezraa
- Neighbourhood
- Location in Turkey
- Coordinates: 41.1976°N 35.1168°E
- Country: Turkey
- Province: Samsun
- District: Vezirköprü
- Population (2022): 428
- Time zone: UTC+3 (TRT)

Mezraa is a neighbourhood in the municipality and district of Vezirköprü, Samsun Province, Turkey. Its population is 428 (2022).
