= Sarıdibek, Vezirköprü =

Sarıdibek
- Neighbourhood
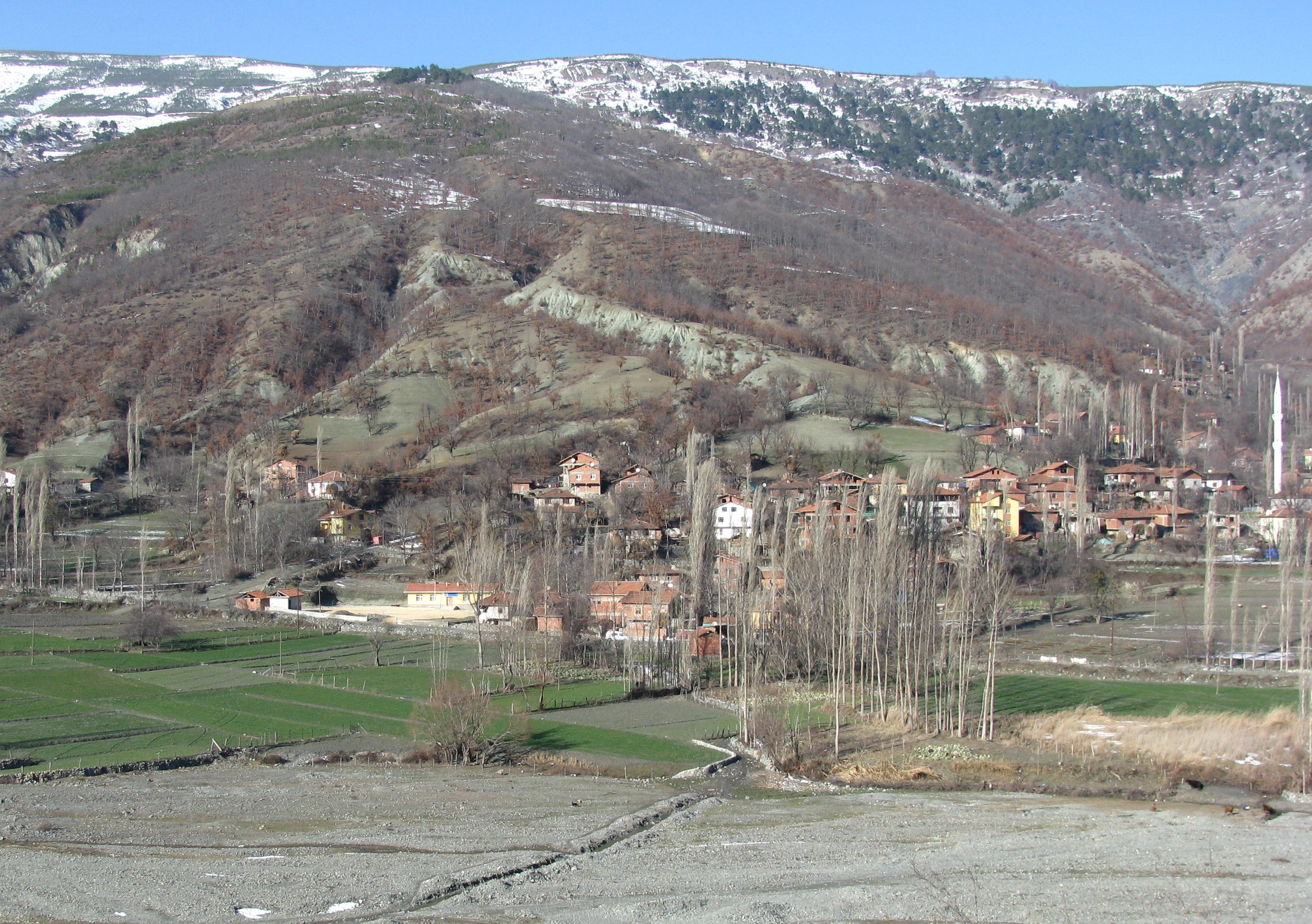
- Sarıdibek

- Location within Turkey
- Coordinates: 41°06′13″N 35°05′20″E
- Country: Turkey
- Province: Samsun
- District: Vezirköprü
- Population (2022): 2,475
- Time zone: UTC+3 (TRT)

Sarıdibek is a neighbourhood in the municipality and district of Vezirköprü, Samsun Province, Turkey. Its population is 2,475 (2022).

In June 1974, 3,000 dönüms of agricultural land around Sarıdibek (then known by its former name, Soruk) was affected by floods. Some residents repeatedly relocated their homes, and others had migrated towards Osmancık and larger cities. A local tradition holds that the settlement came to be called Soruk after Soruk Bey, who was said to have settled in the region during the thirteenth century and to have been a Kınık Yörük bey within the Karalı group.
