= Saraycık, Vezirköprü =

Saraycık
- Neighbourhood
- Location in Turkey
- Coordinates: 41.2322°N 35.2192°E
- Country: Turkey
- Province: Samsun
- District: Vezirköprü
- Population (2022): 653
- Time zone: UTC+3 (TRT)

Saraycık is a neighbourhood in the municipality and district of Vezirköprü, Samsun Province, Turkey. Its population is 653 (2022).
