= Hacılı, Vezirköprü =

Hacılı
- Neighbourhood
- Location in Turkey
- Coordinates: 41.1269°N 35.5427°E
- Country: Turkey
- Province: Samsun
- District: Vezirköprü
- Population (2022): 266
- Time zone: UTC+3 (TRT)

Hacılı is a neighbourhood in the municipality and district of Vezirköprü, Samsun Province, Turkey. Its population is 266 (2022).
