= Kuruçay, Vezirköprü =

Kuruçay
- Neighbourhood
- Location in Turkey
- Coordinates: 41.2865°N 35.4310°E
- Country: Turkey
- Province: Samsun
- District: Vezirköprü
- Population (2022): 296
- Time zone: UTC+3 (TRT)

Kuruçay is a neighbourhood in the municipality and district of Vezirköprü, Samsun Province, Turkey. Its population is 296 (2022).
