= Karabük, Vezirköprü =

Karabük
- Neighbourhood
- Location in Turkey
- Coordinates: 41.1220°N 35.3372°E
- Country: Turkey
- Province: Samsun
- District: Vezirköprü
- Population (2022): 69
- Time zone: UTC+3 (TRT)

Karabük is a neighbourhood in the municipality and district of Vezirköprü, Samsun Province, Turkey. Its population is 69 (2022).
