= Melikli, Vezirköprü =

Melikli
- Neighbourhood
- Location in Turkey
- Coordinates: 41.0574°N 35.4102°E
- Country: Turkey
- Province: Samsun
- District: Vezirköprü
- Population (2022): 64
- Time zone: UTC+3 (TRT)

Melikli is a neighbourhood in the municipality and district of Vezirköprü, Samsun Province, Turkey. Its population is 64 (2022).
