= Çamlıdere, Vezirköprü =

Çamlıdere
- Neighbourhood
- Location in Turkey
- Coordinates: 41°11′N 35°36′E
- Country: Turkey
- Province: Samsun
- District: Vezirköprü
- Population (2022): 102
- Time zone: UTC+3 (TRT)

Çamlıdere (formerly: Danabaş) is a neighbourhood in the municipality and district of Vezirköprü, Samsun Province, Turkey. Its population is 102 (2022).
