= Bektaş, Vezirköprü =

Bektaş
- Neighbourhood
- Location in Turkey
- Coordinates: 41.0770°N 35.4058°E
- Country: Turkey
- Province: Samsun
- District: Vezirköprü
- Population (2022): 26
- Time zone: UTC+3 (TRT)

Bektaş is a neighbourhood in the municipality and district of Vezirköprü, Samsun Province, Turkey. Its population is 26 (2022).
