= Elmalı, Vezirköprü =

Elmalı
- Neighbourhood
- Location in Turkey
- Coordinates: 41.0374°N 35.3562°E
- Country: Turkey
- Province: Samsun
- District: Vezirköprü
- Population (2022): 67
- Time zone: UTC+3 (TRT)

Elmalı is a neighbourhood in the Vezirköprü district, Samsun Province, Turkey. Its population is 67 (2022).
