= Yeniçelik, Vezirköprü =

Yeniçelik
- Neighbourhood
- Location in Turkey
- Coordinates: 41°04′N 35°31′E
- Country: Turkey
- Province: Samsun
- District: Vezirköprü
- Population (2022): 355
- Time zone: UTC+3 (TRT)

Yeniçelik is a neighbourhood in the municipality and district of Vezirköprü, Samsun Province, Turkey. Its population is 355 (2022).
