= Gömlekhisar, Vezirköprü =

Gömlekhisar
- Neighbourhood
- Location in Turkey
- Coordinates: 41°07′N 35°22′E
- Country: Turkey
- Province: Samsun
- District: Vezirköprü
- Population (2022): 475
- Time zone: UTC+3 (TRT)

Gömlekhisar is a neighbourhood in the municipality and district of Vezirköprü, Samsun Province, Turkey. Its population is 475 (2022).
