= Güder, Vezirköprü =

Güder
- Neighbourhood
- Location in Turkey
- Coordinates: 41.0845°N 35.5761°E
- Country: Turkey
- Province: Samsun
- District: Vezirköprü
- Population (2022): 278
- Time zone: UTC+3 (TRT)

Güder is a neighbourhood in the municipality and district of Vezirköprü, Samsun Province, Turkey. Its population is 278 (2022).
