= Mahmatlı, Vezirköprü =

Mahmatlı
- Neighbourhood
- Country: Turkey
- Province: Samsun
- District: Vezirköprü
- Population (2022): 247
- Time zone: UTC+3 (TRT)

Mahmatlı is a neighbourhood in the municipality and district of Vezirköprü, Samsun Province, Turkey. Its population is 247 (2022).
