= Kıratbükü, Vezirköprü =

Kıratbükü
- Neighbourhood
- Location in Turkey
- Coordinates: 41°14′N 35°22′E
- Country: Turkey
- Province: Samsun
- District: Vezirköprü
- Population (2022): 120
- Time zone: UTC+3 (TRT)

Kıratbükü is a neighbourhood in the municipality and district of Vezirköprü, Samsun Province, Turkey. Its population is 120 (2022).
