= İmircik, Vezirköprü =

İmircik
- Neighbourhood
- Location in Turkey
- Coordinates: 41.1743°N 35.6425°E
- Country: Turkey
- Province: Samsun
- District: Vezirköprü
- Population (2022): 168
- Time zone: UTC+3 (TRT)

İmircik is a neighbourhood in the municipality and district of Vezirköprü, Samsun Province, Turkey. Its population is 168 (2022).
