= Oruç, Vezirköprü =

Oruç
- Neighbourhood
- Location in Turkey
- Coordinates: 41.1318°N 35.4299°E
- Country: Turkey
- Province: Samsun
- District: Vezirköprü
- Population (2022): 320
- Time zone: UTC+3 (TRT)

Oruç is a neighbourhood in the municipality and district of Vezirköprü, Samsun Province, Turkey. Its population is 320 (2022).
