= İncesu, Vezirköprü =

İncesu
- Neighbourhood
- Location in Turkey
- Coordinates: 41.1643°N 35.3253°E
- Country: Turkey
- Province: Samsun
- District: Vezirköprü
- Population (2022): 1,117
- Time zone: UTC+3 (TRT)

İncesu is a neighbourhood in the municipality and district of Vezirköprü, Samsun Province, Turkey. Its population is 1,117 (2022).
