= Çamlıkonak, Vezirköprü =

Çamlıkonak
- Neighbourhood
- Location in Turkey
- Coordinates: 41°08′N 35°20′E
- Country: Turkey
- Province: Samsun
- District: Vezirköprü
- Population (2022): 114
- Time zone: UTC+3 (TRT)

Çamlıkonak is a neighbourhood in the municipality and district of Vezirköprü, Samsun Province, Turkey. Its population is 114 (2022).
