= Özyörük, Vezirköprü =

Özyörük
- Neighbourhood
- Country: Turkey
- Province: Samsun
- District: Vezirköprü
- Population (2022): 80
- Time zone: UTC+3 (TRT)

Özyörük is a neighbourhood in the municipality and district of Vezirköprü, Samsun Province, Turkey. Its population is 80 (2022).
