= Taşlıyük, Vezirköprü =

Taşlıyük
- Neighbourhood
- Location in Turkey
- Coordinates: 41.0704°N 35.4295°E
- Country: Turkey
- Province: Samsun
- District: Vezirköprü
- Population (2022): 354
- Time zone: UTC+3 (TRT)

Taşlıyük is a neighbourhood in the municipality and district of Vezirköprü, Samsun Province, Turkey. Its population is 354 (2022).
