= Samur, Vezirköprü =

Samur
- Neighbourhood
- Location in Turkey
- Coordinates: 41.2274°N 35.4668°E
- Country: Turkey
- Province: Samsun
- District: Vezirköprü
- Population (2022): 192
- Time zone: UTC+3 (TRT)

Samur is a neighbourhood in the municipality and district of Vezirköprü, Samsun Province, Turkey. Its population is 192 (2022).
