= Yukarınarlı, Vezirköprü =

Yukarınarlı
- Neighbourhood
- Location in Turkey
- Coordinates: 41°11′N 35°16′E
- Country: Turkey
- Province: Samsun
- District: Vezirköprü
- Population (2022): 769
- Time zone: UTC+3 (TRT)

Yukarınarlı is a neighbourhood in the municipality and district of Vezirköprü, Samsun Province, Turkey. Its population is 769 (2022).
