= Ayvalı, Vezirköprü =

Ayvalı
- Neighbourhood
- Location in Turkey
- Coordinates: 41.0984°N 35.3833°E
- Country: Turkey
- Province: Samsun
- District: Vezirköprü
- Population (2022): 224
- Time zone: UTC+3 (TRT)

Ayvalı is a neighbourhood in the municipality and district of Vezirköprü, Samsun Province, Turkey. Its population is 224 (2022).
