= Çeltek, Vezirköprü =

Çeltek
- Neighbourhood
- Location in Turkey
- Coordinates: 41.2208°N 35.3367°E
- Country: Turkey
- Province: Samsun
- District: Vezirköprü
- Population (2022): 308
- Time zone: UTC+3 (TRT)

Çeltek is a neighbourhood in the district of Vezirköprü, Samsun Province, Turkey. Its population is 308 (2022).
