= Avdan, Vezirköprü =

Avdan
- Neighbourhood
- Location in Turkey
- Coordinates: 41.1937°N 35.4172°E
- Country: Turkey
- Province: Samsun
- District: Vezirköprü
- Population (2022): 516
- Time zone: UTC+3 (TRT)

Avdan is a neighbourhood in the municipality and district of Vezirköprü, Samsun Province, Turkey. Its population is 516 (2022).
