= Kızılcakoru, Vezirköprü =

Kızılcakoru
- Neighbourhood
- Location in Turkey
- Coordinates: 41°03′N 35°21′E
- Country: Turkey
- Province: Samsun
- District: Vezirköprü
- Population (2022): 124
- Time zone: UTC+3 (TRT)

Kızılcakoru is a neighbourhood in the municipality and district of Vezirköprü, Samsun Province, Turkey. Its population is 124 (2022).
