= Kaplancık, Vezirköprü =

Kaplancık
- Neighbourhood
- Location in Turkey
- Coordinates: 41.2298°N 35.5449°E
- Country: Turkey
- Province: Samsun
- District: Vezirköprü
- Population (2022): 183
- Time zone: UTC+3 (TRT)

Kaplancık is a neighbourhood in the district of Vezirköprü, Samsun Province, Turkey. Its population is 183 (2022).
