= Yenidüzce, Vezirköprü =

Yenidüzce
- Neighbourhood
- Location in Turkey
- Coordinates: 41°14′N 35°08′E
- Country: Turkey
- Province: Samsun
- District: Vezirköprü
- Population (2022): 334
- Time zone: UTC+3 (TRT)

Yenidüzce is a neighbourhood in the municipality and district of Vezirköprü, Samsun Province, Turkey. Its population is 334 (2022).
