= Çaltı, Vezirköprü =

Çaltı
- Neighbourhood
- Location in Turkey
- Coordinates: 41.3274°N 35.1271°E
- Country: Turkey
- Province: Samsun
- District: Vezirköprü
- Population (2022): 238
- Time zone: UTC+3 (TRT)

Çaltı is a neighbourhood in the district of Vezirköprü, Samsun Province, Turkey. Its population is 238 (2022).
