= Örencik, Vezirköprü =

Örencik
- Neighbourhood
- Location in Turkey
- Coordinates: 41.2135°N 35.3905°E
- Country: Turkey
- Province: Samsun
- District: Vezirköprü
- Population (2022): 434
- Time zone: UTC+3 (TRT)

Örencik is a neighbourhood in the municipality and district of Vezirköprü, Samsun Province, Turkey. Its population is 434 (2022).
