= Darıçay, Vezirköprü =

Darıçay
- Neighbourhood
- Location in Turkey
- Coordinates: 41°17′N 34°57′E
- Country: Turkey
- Province: Samsun
- District: Vezirköprü
- Population (2022): 190
- Time zone: UTC+3 (TRT)

Darıçay is a neighbourhood in the municipality and district of Vezirköprü, Samsun Province, Turkey. Its population is 190 (2022).
