= Elaldı, Vezirköprü =

Elaldı
- Neighbourhood
- Location in Turkey
- Coordinates: 41.0504°N 35.4461°E
- Country: Turkey
- Province: Samsun
- District: Vezirköprü
- Population (2022): 523
- Time zone: UTC+3 (TRT)

Elaldı is a neighbourhood in the municipality and district of Vezirköprü, Samsun Province, Turkey. Its population is 523 (2022).
