= Kıranalan, Vezirköprü =

Kıranalan
- Neighbourhood
- Location in Turkey
- Coordinates: 41°12′N 35°09′E
- Country: Turkey
- Province: Samsun
- District: Vezirköprü
- Population (2022): 717
- Time zone: UTC+3 (TRT)

Kıranalan is a neighbourhood in the municipality and district of Vezirköprü, Samsun Province, Turkey. Its population is 717 (2022).
