= Aydoğdu, Vezirköprü =

Aydoğdu
- Neighbourhood
- Location in Turkey
- Coordinates: 41.1159°N 35.5706°E
- Country: Turkey
- Province: Samsun
- District: Vezirköprü
- Population (2022): 410
- Time zone: UTC+3 (TRT)

Aydoğdu is a neighbourhood in the municipality and district of Vezirköprü, Samsun Province, Turkey. Its population was 410 (2022).
