= Yolpınar, Vezirköprü =

Yolpınar
- Neighbourhood
- Location in Turkey
- Coordinates: 41.2969°N 35.6086°E
- Country: Turkey
- Province: Samsun
- District: Vezirköprü
- Population (2022): 101
- Time zone: UTC+3 (TRT)

Yolpınar is a neighbourhood in the municipality and district of Vezirköprü, Samsun Province, Turkey. Its population is 101 (2022).
