= Karapınar, Vezirköprü =

Karapınar
- Neighbourhood
- Country: Turkey
- Province: Samsun
- District: Vezirköprü
- Population (2022): 260
- Time zone: UTC+3 (TRT)

Karapınar is a neighbourhood in the municipality and district of Vezirköprü, Samsun Province, Turkey. Its population is 260 (2022).
