= Boğazkoru, Vezirköprü =

Boğazkoru
- Neighbourhood
- Location in Turkey
- Coordinates: 41°05′N 35°35′E
- Country: Turkey
- Province: Samsun
- District: Vezirköprü
- Population (2022): 178
- Time zone: UTC+3 (TRT)

Boğazkoru is a neighbourhood in the municipality and district of Vezirköprü, Samsun Province, Turkey. Its population is 178 (2022).
