= Kuyumcu, Vezirköprü =

Kuyumcu
- Neighbourhood
- Country: Turkey
- Province: Samsun
- District: Vezirköprü
- Population (2022): 356
- Time zone: UTC+3 (TRT)

Kuyumcu (also: Kuyumcular) is a neighbourhood in the municipality and district of Vezirköprü, Samsun Province, Turkey. Its population is 356 (2022).
