= Akören, Vezirköprü =

Akören
- Neighbourhood
- Location in Turkey
- Coordinates: 41.1923°N 35.4621°E
- Country: Turkey
- Province: Samsun
- District: Vezirköprü
- Population (2022): 751
- Time zone: UTC+3 (TRT)

Akören is a neighbourhood in the municipality and district of Vezirköprü, Samsun Province, Turkey. Its population is 751 (2022).
