= Adatepe, Vezirköprü =

Adatepe
- Neighbourhood
- Location in Turkey
- Coordinates: 41.1786°N 35.4549°E
- Country: Turkey
- Province: Samsun
- District: Vezirköprü
- Population (2022): 1,190
- Time zone: UTC+3 (TRT)

Adatepe is a neighbourhood in the municipality and district of Vezirköprü, Samsun Province, Turkey. Its population is 1,190 (2022).
