= Küçükkale, Vezirköprü =

Küçükkale
- Neighbourhood
- Country: Turkey
- Province: Samsun
- District: Vezirköprü
- Population (2022): 76
- Time zone: UTC+3 (TRT)

Küçükkale is a neighbourhood in the district of Vezirköprü, Samsun Province, Turkey. Its population is 76 (2022).
