= Köprübaşı, Vezirköprü =

Köprübaşı
- Neighbourhood
- Location in Turkey
- Coordinates: 41.0475°N 35.5169°E
- Country: Turkey
- Province: Samsun
- District: Vezirköprü
- Population (2022): 106
- Time zone: UTC+3 (TRT)

Köprübaşı is a neighbourhood in the municipality and district of Vezirköprü, Samsun Province, Turkey. Its population is 106 (2022).
