= Tepeören, Vezirköprü =

Tepeören
- Neighbourhood
- Location in Turkey
- Coordinates: 41.0639°N 35.4768°E
- Country: Turkey
- Province: Samsun
- District: Vezirköprü
- Population (2022): 957
- Time zone: UTC+3 (TRT)

Tepeören is a neighbourhood in the municipality and district of Vezirköprü, Samsun Province, Turkey. Its population is 957 (2022).
