= Bakla, Vezirköprü =

Bakla
- Neighbourhood
- Location in Turkey
- Coordinates: 41.1527°N 35.2300°E
- Country: Turkey
- Province: Samsun
- District: Vezirköprü
- Population (2022): 420
- Time zone: UTC+3 (TRT)

Bakla is a neighbourhood in the municipality and district of Vezirköprü, Samsun Province, Turkey. Its population is 420 (2022).
