= Alancık, Vezirköprü =

Alancık
- Neighbourhood
- Location in Turkey
- Coordinates: 41.2823°N 35.5409°E
- Country: Turkey
- Province: Samsun
- District: Vezirköprü
- Population (2022): 12
- Time zone: UTC+3 (TRT)

Alancık is a neighbourhood in the municipality and district of Vezirköprü, Samsun Province, Turkey. Its population is 12 (2022).
