= Sarıalan, Vezirköprü =

Sarıalan
- Neighbourhood
- Location in Turkey
- Coordinates: 41.1929°N 35.1937°E
- Country: Turkey
- Province: Samsun
- District: Vezirköprü
- Population (2022): 715
- Time zone: UTC+3 (TRT)

Sarıalan is a neighbourhood in the municipality and district of Vezirköprü, Samsun Province, Turkey. Its population is 715 (2022).
