= Yağınözü, Vezirköprü =

Yağınözü
- Neighbourhood
- Location in Turkey
- Coordinates: 41°10′N 35°24′E
- Country: Turkey
- Province: Samsun
- District: Vezirköprü
- Population (2022): 1,240
- Time zone: UTC+3 (TRT)

Yağınözü is a neighbourhood in the municipality and district of Vezirköprü, Samsun Province, Turkey. Its population is 1,240 (2022).
