= Göllüalan, Vezirköprü =

Göllüalan
- Neighbourhood
- Location in Turkey
- Coordinates: 41°08′N 35°18′E
- Country: Turkey
- Province: Samsun
- District: Vezirköprü
- Population (2022): 336
- Time zone: UTC+3 (TRT)

Göllüalan is a neighbourhood in the municipality and district of Vezirköprü, Samsun Province, Turkey. Its population is 336 (2022).
