= Yürükçal, Vezirköprü =

Yürükçal
- Neighbourhood
- Location in Turkey
- Coordinates: 41°09′N 35°32′E
- Country: Turkey
- Province: Samsun
- District: Vezirköprü
- Population (2022): 249
- Time zone: UTC+3 (TRT)

Yürükçal is a neighbourhood in the municipality and district of Vezirköprü, Samsun Province, Turkey. Its population is 249 (2022).
