= Esentepe, Vezirköprü =

Esentepe
- Neighbourhood
- Location in Turkey
- Coordinates: 41°06′48″N 35°09′06″E
- Country: Turkey
- Province: Samsun
- District: Vezirköprü
- Population (2022): 3,825
- Time zone: UTC+3 (TRT)

Esentepe is a neighbourhood in the municipality and district of Vezirköprü, Samsun Province, Turkey. Its population is 3,825 (2022).
