= Doyran, Vezirköprü =

Doyran
- Neighbourhood
- Location in Turkey
- Coordinates: 41.1201°N 35.4719°E
- Country: Turkey
- Province: Samsun
- District: Vezirköprü
- Population (2022): 376
- Time zone: UTC+3 (TRT)

Doyran is a neighbourhood in the municipality and district of Vezirköprü, Samsun Province, Turkey. Its population is 376 (2022).
