= Hayranlı, Vezirköprü =

Hayranlı
- Neighbourhood
- Location in Turkey
- Coordinates: 41.1311°N 35.3645°E
- Country: Turkey
- Province: Samsun
- District: Vezirköprü
- Population (2022): 364
- Time zone: UTC+3 (TRT)

Hayranlı is a neighbourhood in the municipality and district of Vezirköprü, Samsun Province, Turkey. Its population is 364 (2022).
