= Kuşçular, Vezirköprü =

Kuşçular
- Neighbourhood
- Location in Turkey
- Coordinates: 41.0592°N 35.4037°E
- Country: Turkey
- Province: Samsun
- District: Vezirköprü
- Population (2022): 240
- Time zone: UTC+3 (TRT)

Kuşçular is a neighbourhood in the municipality and district of Vezirköprü, Samsun Province, Turkey. Its population is 240 (2022).
