= Alanşeyhi, Vezirköprü =

Alanşeyhi
- Neighbourhood
- Location in Turkey
- Coordinates: 41°06′N 35°08′E
- Country: Turkey
- Province: Samsun
- District: Vezirköprü
- Population (2022): 884
- Time zone: UTC+3 (TRT)

Alanşeyhi is a neighbourhood in the municipality and district of Vezirköprü, Samsun Province, Turkey. Its population is 884 (2022).
