= Ahmetbaba, Vezirköprü =

Ahmetbaba
- Neighbourhood
- Location in Turkey
- Coordinates: 41°07′N 35°15′E
- Country: Turkey
- Province: Samsun
- District: Vezirköprü
- Population (2022): 449
- Time zone: UTC+3 (TRT)

Ahmetbaba is a neighbourhood in the municipality and district of Vezirköprü, Samsun Province, Turkey. Its population is 449 (2022).
