= Bahçesaray, Vezirköprü =

Bahçesaray
- Neighbourhood
- Location in Turkey
- Coordinates: 41.2167°N 35.1157°E
- Country: Turkey
- Province: Samsun
- District: Vezirköprü
- Population (2022): 170
- Time zone: UTC+3 (TRT)

Bahçesaray is a neighbourhood in the municipality and district of Vezirköprü, Samsun Province, Turkey. Its population is 170 (2022).
