= Ağcayazı, Vezirköprü =

Ağcayazı
- Neighbourhood
- Location in Turkey
- Coordinates: 41°11′N 35°19′E
- Country: Turkey
- Province: Samsun
- District: Vezirköprü
- Population (2022): 45
- Time zone: UTC+3 (TRT)

Ağcayazı is a neighbourhood in the municipality and district of Vezirköprü, Samsun Province, Turkey. Its population is 45 (2022).
