= Elbeyi, Vezirköprü =

Elbeyi
- Neighbourhood
- Location in Turkey
- Coordinates: 41.0791°N 35.4718°E
- Country: Turkey
- Province: Samsun
- District: Vezirköprü
- Population (2022): 164
- Time zone: UTC+3 (TRT)

Elbeyi is a neighbourhood in the municipality and district of Vezirköprü, Samsun Province, Turkey. Its population is 164 (2022).
