= Göl, Vezirköprü =

Göl
- Neighbourhood
- Location in Turkey
- Coordinates: 41.1488°N 35.1602°E
- Country: Turkey
- Province: Samsun
- District: Vezirköprü
- Population (2022): 507
- Time zone: UTC+3 (TRT)

Göl is a neighbourhood of the municipality and district of Vezirköprü, Samsun Province, Turkey. Its population is 507 (2022). Before the 2013 reorganisation, it was a town (belde).
