= Alanbaşı, Vezirköprü =

Village in Samsun Province, Turkey

Alanbaşı
- Neighbourhood
- Location in Turkey
- Coordinates: 41.0621°N 35.4187°E
- Country: Turkey
- Province: Samsun
- District: Vezirköprü
- Population (2022): 35
- Time zone: UTC+3 (TRT)

Alanbaşı is a neighbourhood in the municipality and district of Vezirköprü, Samsun Province, Turkey. Its population is 35 (2022).
