= Duruçay, Vezirköprü =

Duruçay
- Neighbourhood
- Location in Turkey
- Coordinates: 41.0520°N 35.2751°E
- Country: Turkey
- Province: Samsun
- District: Vezirköprü
- Population (2022): 74
- Time zone: UTC+3 (TRT)

Duruçay is a neighbourhood in the Vezirköprü district of Samsun Province, Turkey. Its population is 74 (2022).
