= Narlısaray, Vezirköprü =

Narlısaray
- Neighbourhood
- Location in Turkey
- Coordinates: 41°11′N 35°17′E
- Country: Turkey
- Province: Samsun
- District: Vezirköprü
- Population (2022): 1,083
- Time zone: UTC+3 (TRT)

Narlısaray is a neighbourhood of the municipality and district of Vezirköprü, Samsun Province, Turkey. Its population is 1,083 (2022). Before the 2013 reorganisation, it was a town (belde).
