= Vezirköprü =

- District and municipality
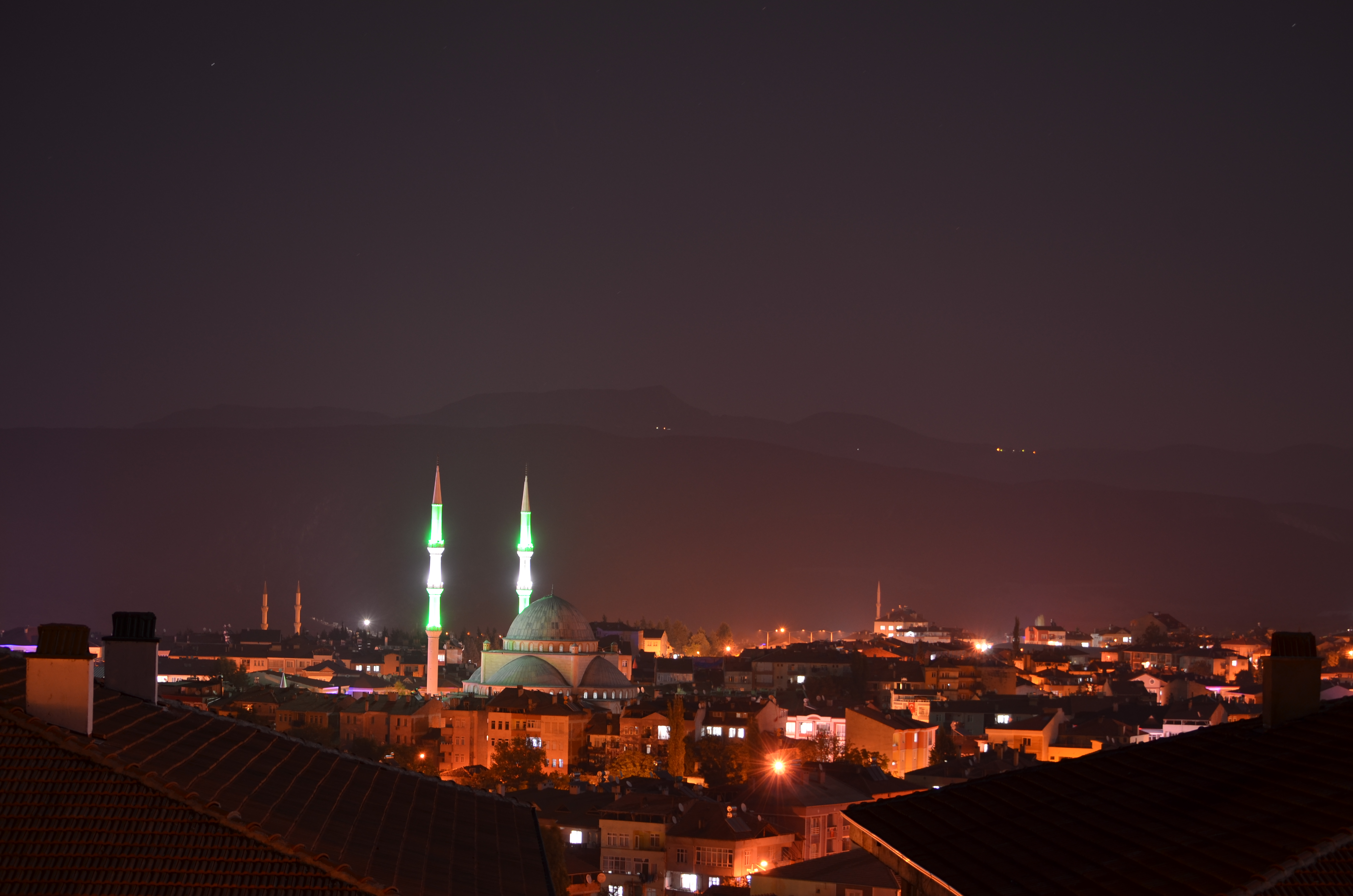
- Köprülü Mehmet Paşa Mosque in Vezirköprü

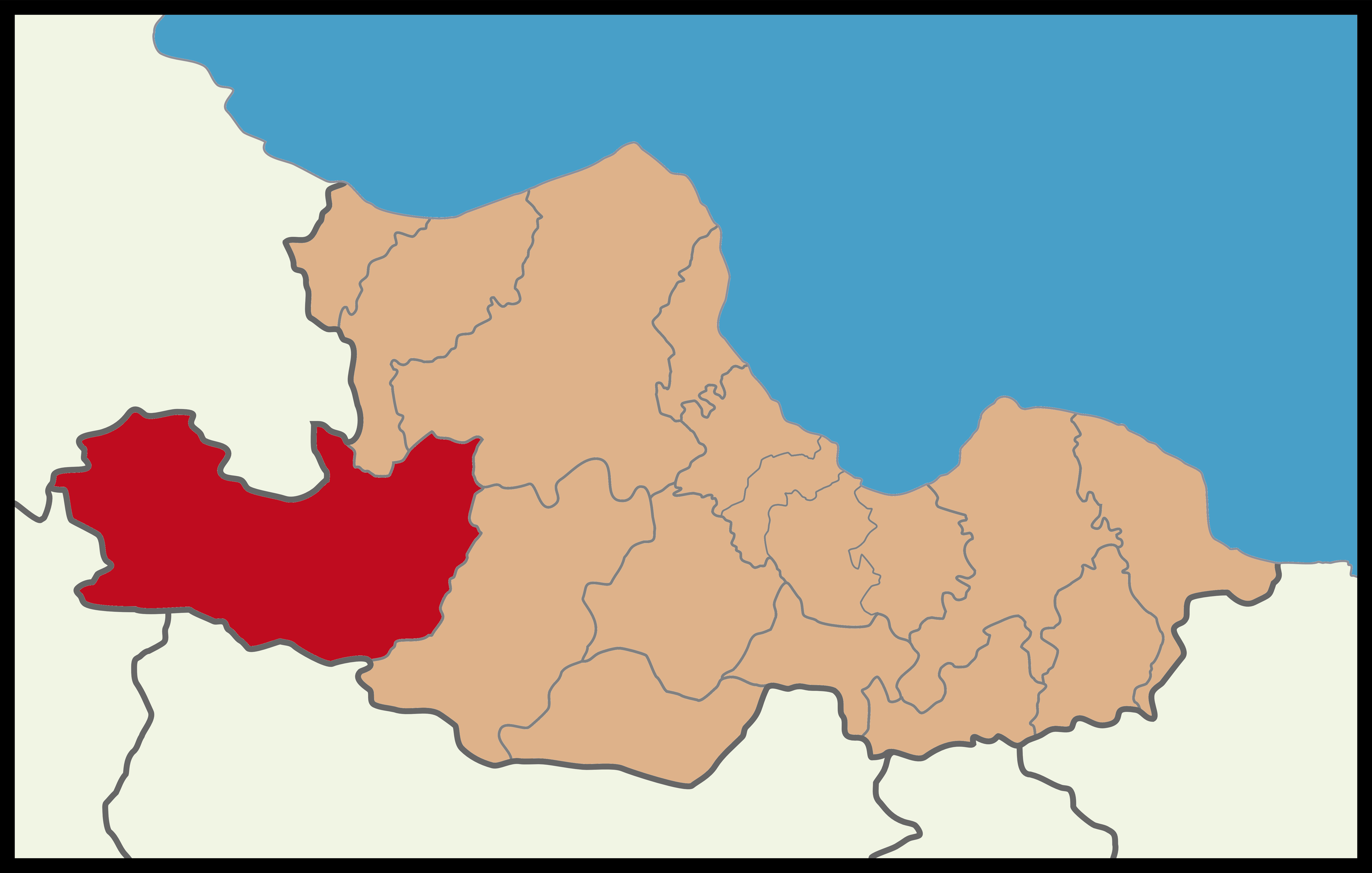
- Map showing Vezirköprü District in Samsun Province

- Location within Turkey
- Coordinates: 41°08′35″N 35°27′36″E
- Country: Turkey
- Province: Samsun

Government
  - Mayor: İbrahim Sadık Edis (AKP)
- Area: 1,674 km^{2} (646 sq mi)
- Population (2022): 90,308
  - Density: 53.95/km^{2} (139.7/sq mi)
- Time zone: UTC+3 (TRT)
- Postal code: 55900
- Area code: 0362
- Website: www.vezirkopru.bel.tr

Vezirköprü is a municipality and district of Samsun Province, Turkey. Its area is 1,674 km^{2}, and its population is 90,308 (2022). It is named after the Ottoman Albanian grand vizier Köprülü Mehmed Pasha.

== History ==
At the breakup of Alexander the Great's empire the Vezirköprü region became part of the kingdom of Pontus with its capital at Amaseia (Amasya), later at Sinope (Sinop). When the last king Mithradates VI was defeated by the Romans, Pompey the Great founded a "new city", Neapolis (Ancient Greek: Νεάπολις), which later changed its name to Neoklaudioupolis (Νεοκλαυδιούπολις) or Neoclaudiopolis in Latin, the forerunner of modern Vezirköprü. In late antiquity, the town returned to its original name, Andrapa (Ἄνδραπα), and became a bishopric. It also minted coins bearing the dates and effigies of Marcus Aurelius, Septimius Severus, and Caracalla.

Its bishop Paralius was at the Council of Ephesus (431) and sent his deacon Eucharius to represent him at the Council of Chalcedon (451). Paulus was one of the signatories of the letter by which the bishops of the Roman province of Helenopontus, to which Andrapa belonged, protested to Byzantine Emperor Leo I the Thracian in 458 about the killing of Proterius of Alexandria. Ioannes was at the Third Council of Constantinople (680), Sergius at the Trullan Council (692). Theodorus was represented at the Second Council of Nicaea (787) by his deacon Marinus. Antonius took part in the Photian Council of Constantinople (879).

No longer a residential bishopric, Andrapa is today listed by the Catholic Church as a titular see.

== Composition ==
There are 161 neighbourhoods in Vezirköprü District:

- Abdülgani
- Adatepe
- Ağcaalan
- Ağcayazı
- Ahmetbaba
- Akören
- Alanbaşı
- Alancık
- Alanköy
- Alanşeyhi
- Altınkaya
- Arıca
- Atatürk
- Avdan
- Aydınlı
- Aydoğdu
- Ayvalı
- Bahçekonak
- Bahçelievler
- Bahçesaray
- Bakla
- Başalan
- Başfakı
- Bayramköy
- Bektaş
- Belalan
- Beşpınar
- Boğaköy
- Boğazkoru
- Boruk
- Burhaniye
- Büyükkale
- Çakırtaş
- Çalköy
- Çalman
- Çaltı
- Çamlıca
- Çamlıdere
- Çamlıkonak
- Çanaklı
- Çayırbaşı
- Cebeli
- Çekalan
- Çekmeden
- Çeltek
- Çorakdere
- Cumhuriyet
- Darıçayalanı
- Darıçay
- Değirmenbaşı
- Devalan
- Doyran
- Duruçay
- Elaldı
- Elbeyi
- Elmalı
- Esen
- Esentepe
- Esenyurt
- Fazıl Ahmet Paşa
- Göl
- Göl Yeni
- Göllüalan
- Gömlekhisar
- Güder
- Güldere
- Habibfakı
- Hacılı
- Halilbaba
- Halkahavlı
- Hayranlı
- Hıdırlık
- İmircik
- İncesu
- İnkaya
- Kabalı
- Kadıçayırı
- Kadıoğlu
- Kapaklı
- Kapaklıeşme
- Kaplancık
- Karabük
- Karacaören
- Karadoruk
- Karaköy
- Karanar
- Karapınar
- Karkucak
- Karlı
- Kavakpınarı
- Kılıçgüney
- Kıranalan
- Kıratbükü
- Kırma
- Kızılcakoru
- Kızılcaören
- Kızılkese
- Kocakaya
- Köprübaşı
- Kovalı
- Küçükkale
- Kületek
- Kumral
- Kuruçay
- Kuşçular
- Kuyaş
- Kuyumcu
- Mahmatlı
- Mehmetpaşa
- Melikli
- Meşeli
- Mezraa
- Nalbantlı
- Narlısaray
- Öğürlü
- Örencik
- Ortacamii
- Ortaköy
- Oruç
- Ovacık
- Oymaağaç
- Özesentepe
- Özgüney
- Özkuruçay
- Özyörük
- Paşaköy
- Pazarcı
- Samukalan
- Samur
- Saraycık
- Saraylı
- Sarıalan
- Sarıdibek
- Sarıyar
- Şentepe
- Sırbaşmak
- Sofular
- Soğucak
- Susuz
- Tabakhane
- Tahtaköprü
- Taşkale
- Taşlıyük
- Tatarkale
- Teberük
- Tekkekıranı
- Tepeören
- Tikenli
- Türkmen
- Yağcı
- Yağınözü
- Yarbaşı
- Yeni
- Yeniçelik
- Yenidüzce
- Yeşilada
- Yeşiltepe
- Yolpınar
- Yukarınarlı
- Yurtdağı
- Yürükçal

== Literature ==
- Arslan, A; İğci, N; Kıvrak, B (2008). Geçmişten Günümüze Vezirköprü (in Turkish). Vezirköprü.
- Bekker-Nielsen, Tønnes (26 November 2013). Yalcin, Ünsal (ed.). "Neapolis-Neoklaudiopolis: a Roman city in northern Anatolia". Anatolian Metal IV. Der Anschnitt. Supplement 25. Bochum: German Mining Museum: 203–214. ISBN 978-3-937203-67-6. ISSN 0003-5238.
- Bekker-Nielsen, Tønnes (28 October 2013). "350 Years of Research on Neoklaudiopolis (Vezirköprü)". Orbis Terrarum. 11. University of Southern Denmark: 3–31. ISSN 1385-285X.
- Bekker-Nielsen, Tønnes; Høgel, Christian (2013). Three epitaphs from the Vezirköprü region. Epigraphica Anatolica. Vol. 45. University of Southern Denmark. pp. 153–160. ISSN 0174-6545.
- Bekker-Nielsen, T., R. Czichon, C. Høgel, B. Kıvrak, J.M. Madsen, V. Sauer, S.L. Sørensen & K. Winther-Jacobsen 2015. Ancient Neoklaudiopolis (Vezirköprü in Samsun Province): A Historical and Archaeological Guide. Istanbul: Arkeoloji ve Sanat Yayınları.
