= Yakakent =

- District and municipality
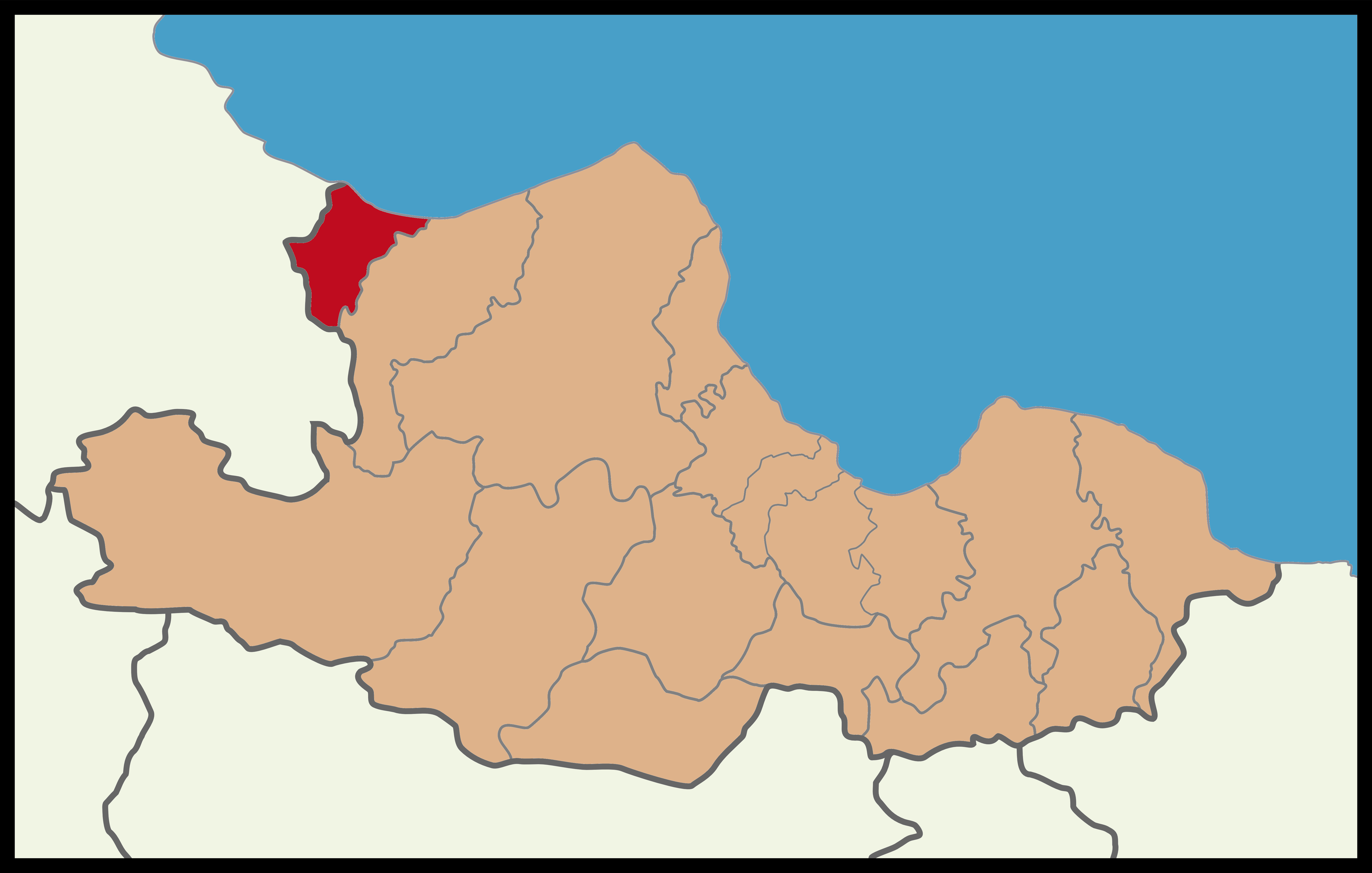
- Map showing Yakakent District in Samsun Province

- Location within Turkey
- Coordinates: 41°37′20″N 35°31′53″E
- Country: Turkey
- Province: Samsun

Government
  - Mayor: Şerafettin Aydoğdu (AKP)
- Area: 204 km^{2} (79 sq mi)
- Population (2022): 8,693
  - Density: 42.6/km^{2} (110/sq mi)
- Time zone: UTC+3 (TRT)
- Postal code: 55810
- Area code: 0362
- Climate: Cfa
- Website: yakakent.bel.tr

Yakakent is a municipality and district of Samsun Province, Turkey. Its area is 204 km^{2}, and its population is 8,693 (2022). It is located on the Black Sea coast.

== Composition ==
There are 17 neighbourhoods in Yakakent District:

- Asmapınar
- Büyükkırık
- Çamalan
- Çepni
- Gündüzlü
- Karaaba
- Kayalı
- Kozköy
- Küplüağzı
- Kürüzgürgenlik
- Kuzören
- Liman
- Merkez
- Mutaflı
- Sarıgöl
- Yassıdağ
- Yeşilköy

== Sister cities ==
Yakakent has one sister city:

- Kushimoto (Japan)
