= Salıpazarı =

- District and municipality
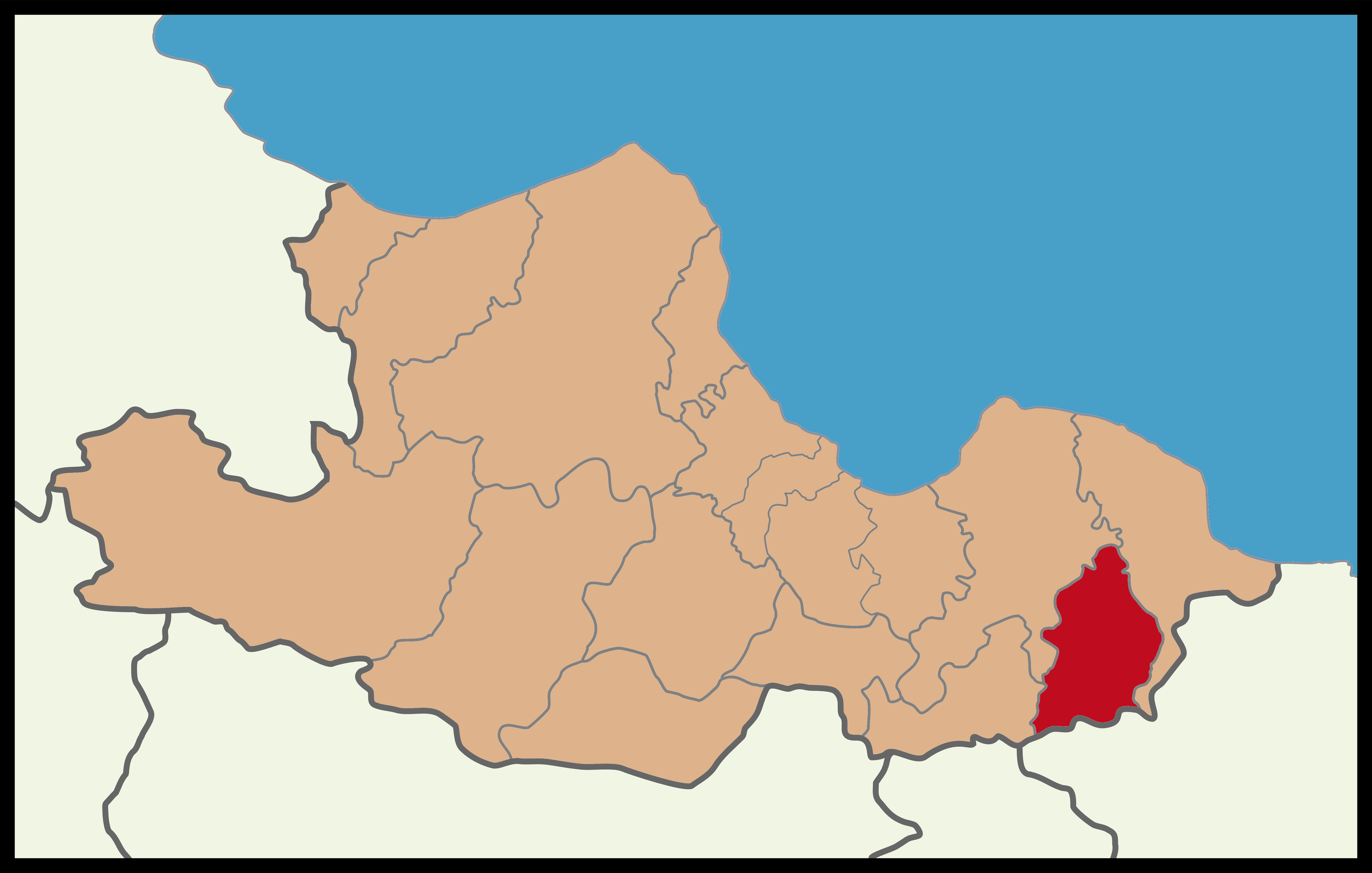
- Map showing Salıpazarı District in Samsun Province

- Location within Turkey
- Coordinates: 41°31′N 35°35′E
- Country: Turkey
- Province: Samsun

Government
  - Mayor: Refaettin Karaca (BBP)
- Area: 356 km^{2} (137 sq mi)
- Population (2022): 19,017
  - Density: 53.4/km^{2} (138/sq mi)
- Time zone: UTC+3 (TRT)
- Area code: 0362
- Climate: Cfa
- Website: www.salipazari.bel.tr

Salıpazarı is a municipality and district of Samsun Province, Turkey. Its area is 356 km^{2}, and its population is 19,017 (2022). The mayor is Refaettin Karaca (BBP).

== Composition ==
There are 44 neighbourhoods in Salıpazarı District:

- Alanköy
- Alanyakın
- Albak
- Avut
- Bereket
- Biçme
- Çağlayan
- Cevizli
- Çiçekli
- Dikencik
- Düzköy
- Esatçiftliği
- Fatsalılar
- Fidancık
- Fındıklı
- Gökçebaşı
- Gökçeli
- Güzelvatan
- Kalfalı
- Karacalar
- Karacaören
- Karadere
- Karaman
- Karayonca
- Kırgıl
- Kızılot
- Kocalar
- Konakören
- Kuşcığaz
- Merkez Kocalar
- Mumlu
- Muslubey
- Orta
- Sarıhasan
- Suluca
- Tacalan
- Tahnal
- Tepealtı
- Yavaşbey
- Yaylaköy
- Yeni
- Yenidoğan
- Yeşilköy
- Yukarıkestanepınar
