= Asarcık =

- District and municipality
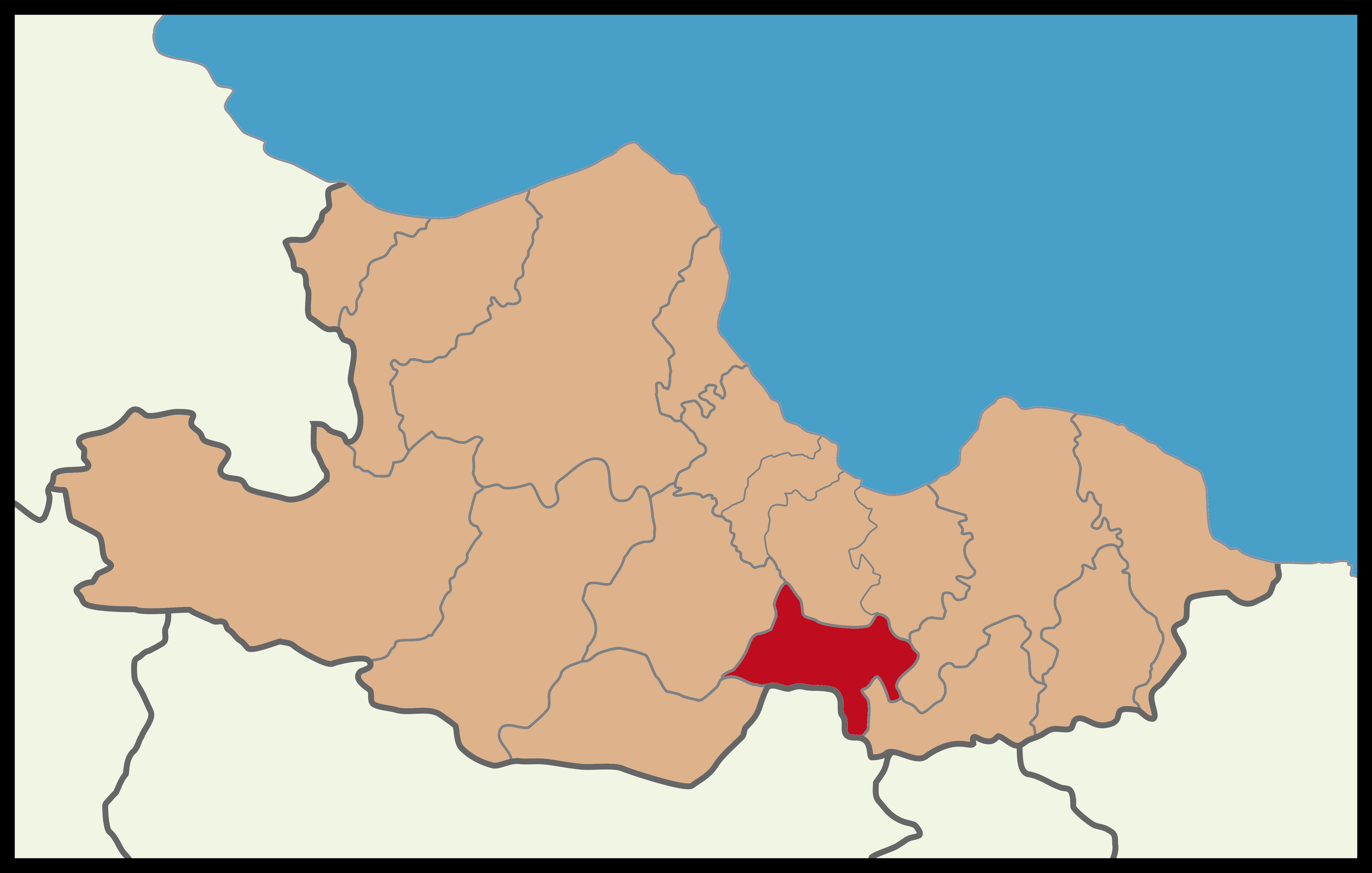
- Map showing Asarcık District in Samsun Province

- Location within Turkey
- Coordinates: 41°01′53″N 36°16′06″E
- Country: Turkey
- Province: Samsun

Government
  - Mayor: Şerif Kılavuz (MHP)
- Area: 253 km^{2} (98 sq mi)
- Population (2022): 16,001
  - Density: 63.2/km^{2} (164/sq mi)
- Time zone: UTC+3 (TRT)
- Postal code: 55860
- Area code: 0362
- Climate: Csb
- Website: www.asarcik.bel.tr

Asarcık is a municipality and district of Samsun Province, Turkey. Its area is 253 km^{2}, and its population is 16,001 (2022).

== Composition ==
There are 32 neighbourhoods in Asarcık District:

- Acısu
- Akyazı
- Alan
- Alişar
- Arıcak
- Armutlu
- Aşuru
- Atatürk
- Ayaklıalan
- Aydınköy
- Biçincik
- Çulhaoğlu
- Dağcılar
- Emirmusa
- Esentepe
- Gökgöl
- Gülveren
- Gündoğdu
- Hisariye
- İmamlı
- Kesealan
- Kılavuzlu
- Koşaca
- Kuyumcuoğlu
- Musaağa
- Sakızlık
- Uluköy
- Yarımca
- Yaylaköy
- Yeniömerli
- Yeşildere
- Yeşilköy
