= Yuxarı Ağcayazı =

- Municipality
- Location within Azerbaijan
- Coordinates: 40°42′21″N 47°30′46″E
- Country: Azerbaijan
- Rayon: Agdash

Population
  - Total: 1,171
- Time zone: UTC+4 (AZT)
  - Summer (DST): UTC+5 (AZT)

Yuxarı Ağcayazı (also, Yukhari Agdzhayazy and Yukhary Agdzhayazy) a village and municipality in the Agdash Rayon of Azerbaijan. It has a population of 1,171. The municipality consists of the villages of Yuxarı Ağcayazı and Aşağı Ağcayazı.
