= Aşağı Ağcayazı =

- Location within Azerbaijan
- Coordinates: 40°41′18″N 47°30′41″E
- Country: Azerbaijan
- Rayon: Agdash
- Municipality: Yuxarı Ağcayazı
- Time zone: UTC+4 (AZT)
  - Summer (DST): UTC+5 (AZT)

Aşağı Ağcayazı (also, Ashaga Agdzhayazy and Ashagy Agdzhayazy) is a village in the Agdash Rayon of Azerbaijan. The village forms part of the municipality of Yuxarı Ağcayazı.
