= Ayvacık, Samsun =

Ayvacık
- District and municipality
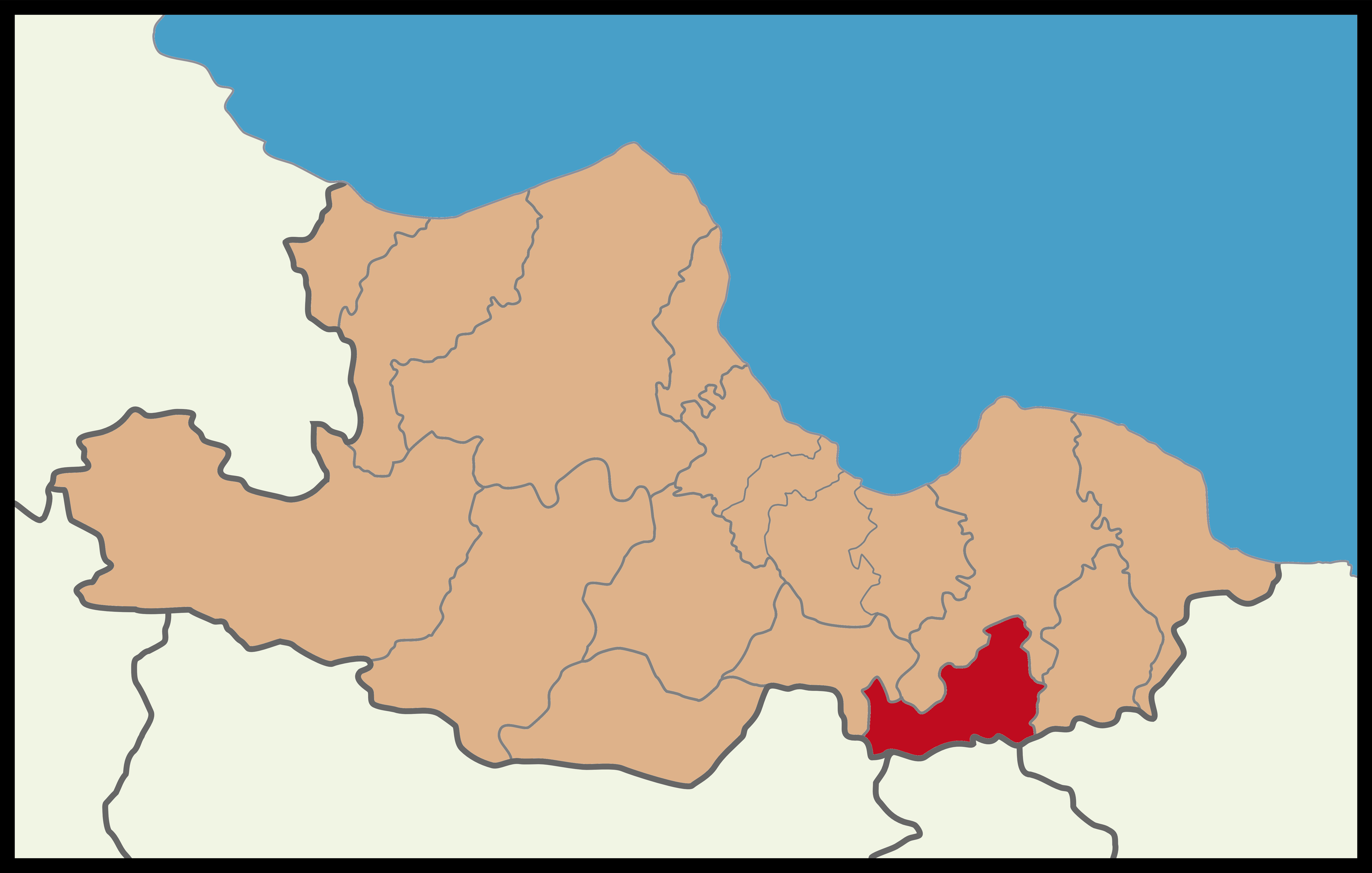
- Map showing Ayvacık District in Samsun Province

- Location within Turkey
- Coordinates: 41°00′13″N 36°37′55″E
- Country: Turkey
- Province: Samsun

Government
  - Mayor: Refahittin Şencan (AKP)
- Area: 382 km^{2} (147 sq mi)
- Population (2022): 18,928
  - Density: 49.5/km^{2} (128/sq mi)
- Time zone: UTC+3 (TRT)
- Postal code: 55550
- Area code: 0362
- Climate: Cfa
- Website: www.ayvacik.bel.tr

Ayvacık is a municipality and district of Samsun Province, Turkey. Its area is 382 km^{2}, and its population is 18,928 (2022). The mayor is Refahittin Şencan (AKP).

== Composition ==
There are 43 neighbourhoods in Ayvacık District:

- Ardıç
- Başalan
- Çamalan
- Çamlıkale
- Çarşıköy
- Çökekli
- Döngel
- Döngelyatak
- Esenyurt
- Eynel
- Eyüpsultan
- Fatihsultanmehmet
- Gülpınar
- Gültepe
- Gürçam
- Güzelyurt
- Kabaklık
- Kapıkaya
- Karaağaç
- Karşıdöngel
- Kazancılı
- Keskinoğlu
- Koçyurdu
- Meşelidüz
- Örencik
- Orhan Gazi
- Orta
- Ortaköy
- Osmanlı
- Sahilköy
- Şenpınar
- Söğütpınarı
- Tepealtı
- Terice
- Tiryakioğlu
- Uğurlu
- Yenice
- Yeniköy
- Yeşilçam
- Yeşildere
- Yeşilpınar
- Yunusemre
- Zafer
