= Samsun Province =

Province of Turkey

Samsun Province Samsun ili
- Province and metropolitan municipality
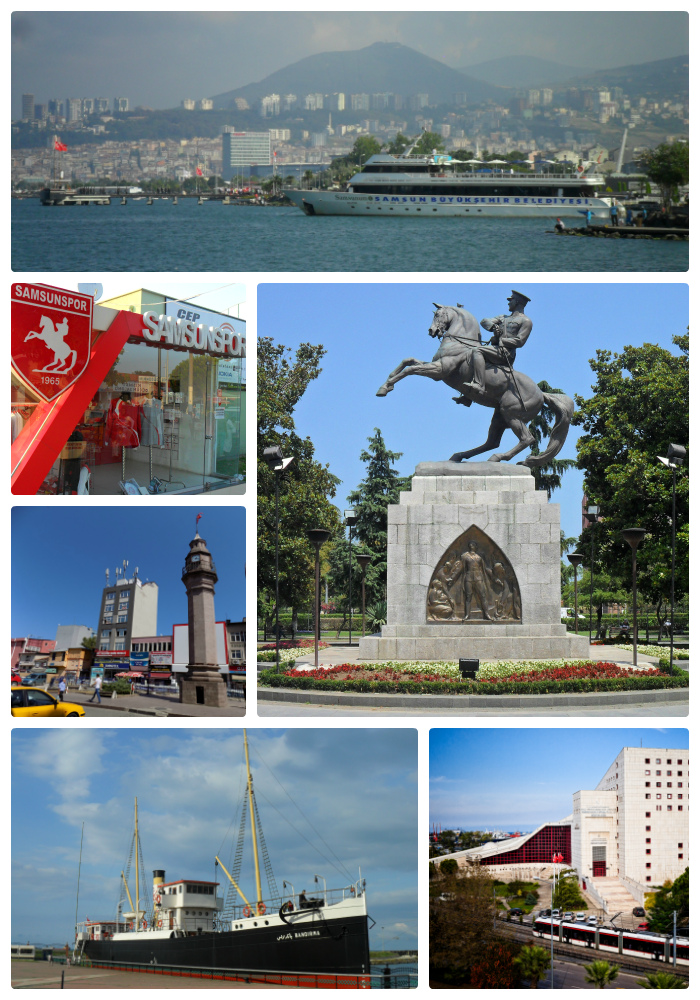

- Location of the province within Turkey
- Coordinates: 41°12′16″N 36°00′26″E
- Country: Turkey
- Seat: Samsun

Government
  - Mayor: Halit Doğan (AKP)
  - Vali: Orhan Tavlı
- Area: 9,725 km^{2} (3,755 sq mi)
- Population (2022): 1,368,488
  - Density: 140.7/km^{2} (364.5/sq mi)
- Time zone: UTC+3 (TRT)
- Area code: 0362
- ISO Code: TR-55
- Website: www.samsun.bel.tr www.samsun.gov.tr

Samsun Province (Turkish: Samsun ili) is a province and metropolitan municipality of Turkey on the Black Sea coast. Its area is 9,725 km^{2}, and its population is 1,368,488 (2022). Its adjacent provinces are Sinop on the northwest, Çorum on the west, Amasya on the south, Tokat on the southeast on the east. Its traffic code is 55. The provincial capital is Samsun, one of the most populated cities in Turkey.

== History ==
Surgical instruments are manufactured in the province today and were 4000 years ago. The founder of the Turkish Republic, Mustafa Kemal Atatürk, started the Turkish War of Independence there on 19 May 1919.

== Geography ==
=== Lakes ===
Ladik Lake, Akgöl, Dumanlı lake, Semenlik lake.

=== Rivers ===
Kızılırmak, Yeşilırmak, Terme river, Aptal Suyu, Mert Irmağı, Kürtün Suyu.

=== Forest ===
There are also small areas of bottomland forest.

=== Districts ===
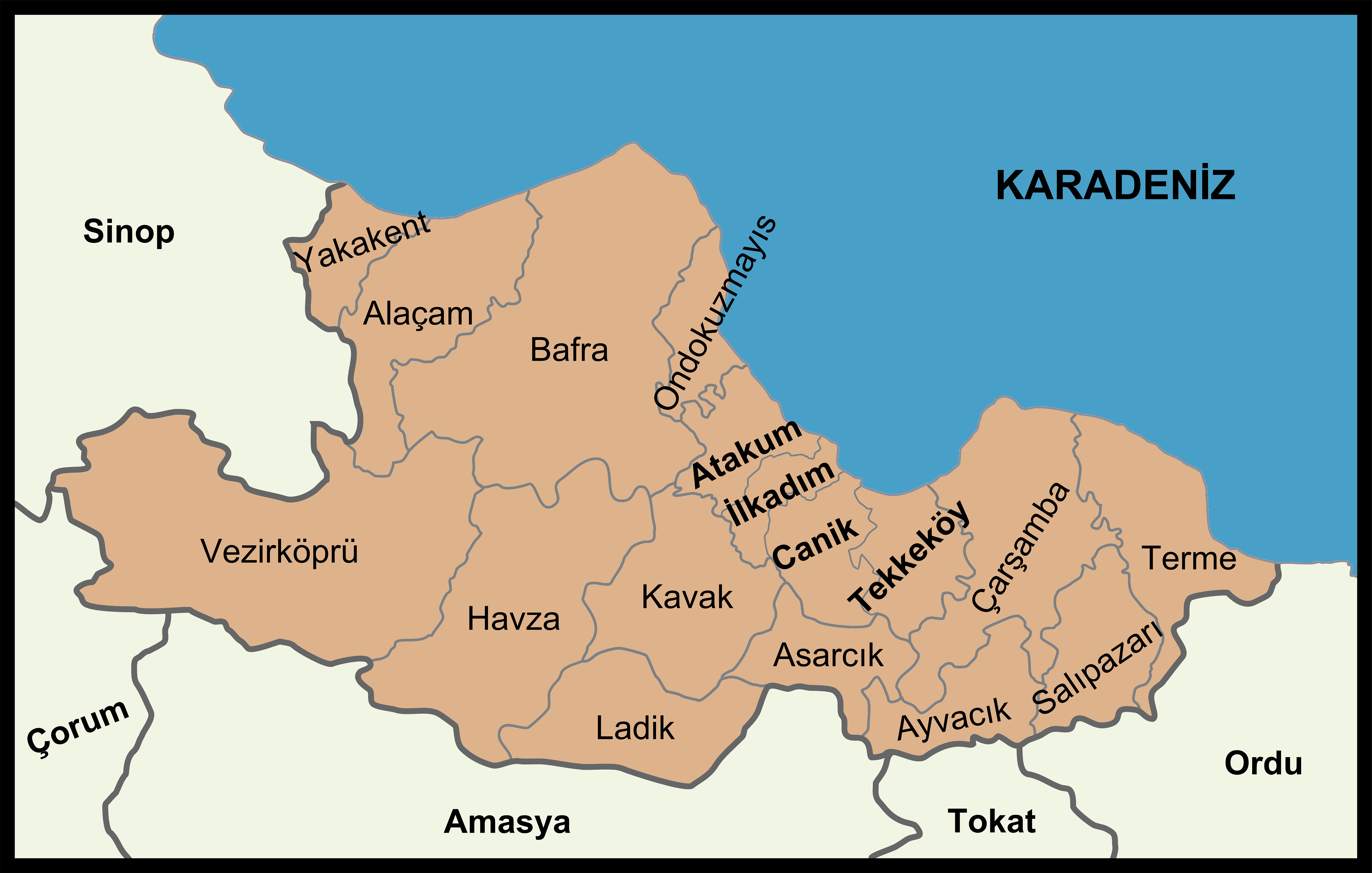
Districts of Samsun (clickable map)

Samsun province is divided into 17 districts, four of which were included in the pre-2013 municipality of Samsun city (shown in boldface letters).

- **İlkadım**
- **Canik**
- **Atakum**
- **Tekkeköy**
- 19 Mayıs
- Alaçam
- Asarcık
- Ayvacık
- Bafra
- Çarşamba
- Havza
- Kavak
- Ladik
- Salıpazarı
- Terme
- Vezirköprü
- Yakakent

== Climate ==
There is a local plan for climate change, but it says nothing about coal although the province imports both coal and gas from Russia.
