= Great Mosque (Samsun) =

Mosque in İlkadım, Samsun, Turkey

- Büyük Cami
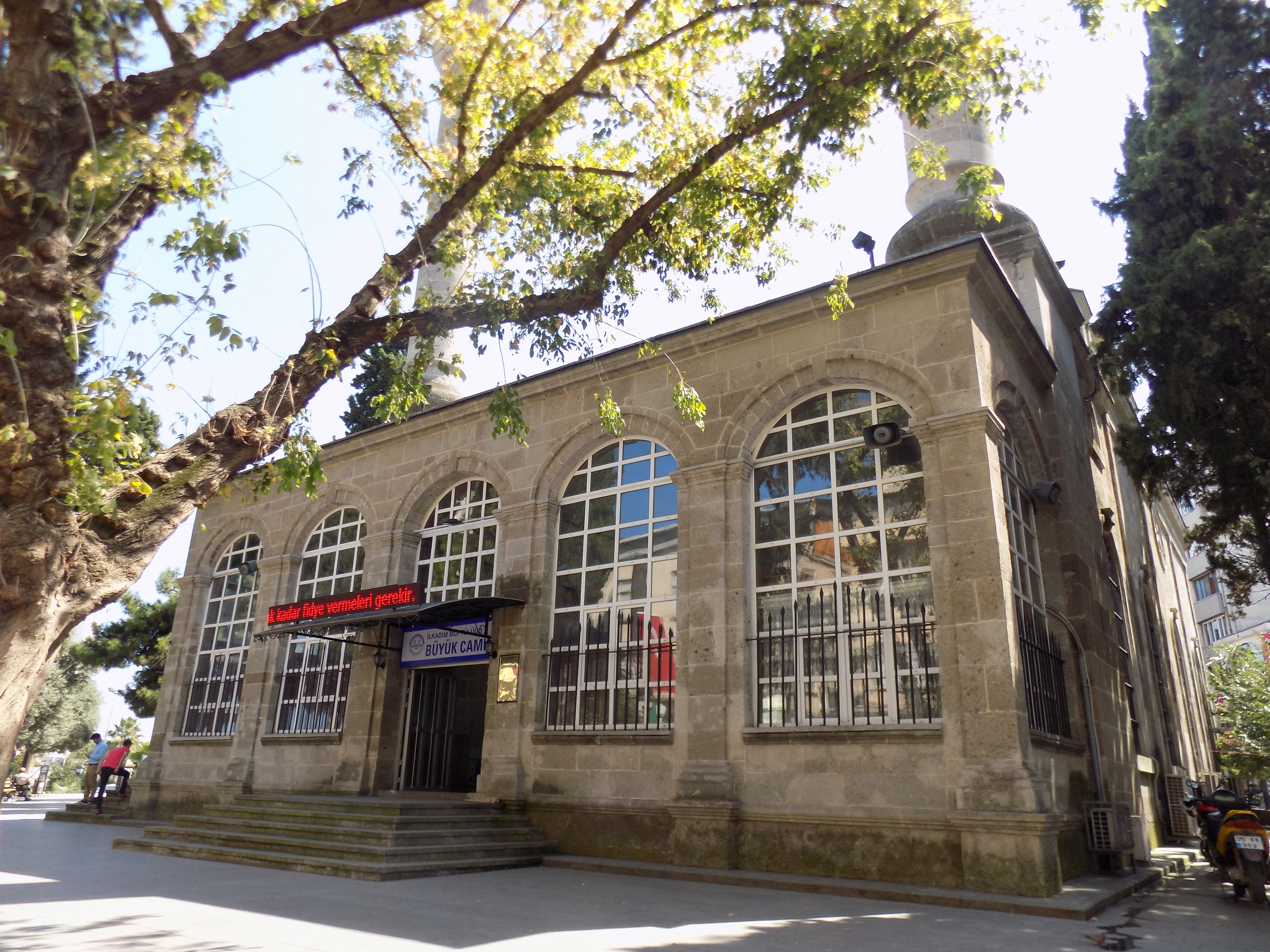
- Büyük Cami Samsun

- Location of the mosque in Turkey

Religion
- Affiliation: Sunni
- District: İlkadım
- Province: Samsun
- Region: Black Sea
- Status: active

Location
- Country: Turkey
- Interactive map of Great Mosque (Samsun)
- Coordinates: 41.294392°N 36.332915°E

Architecture
- Architect: Batumlu Haci Ali
- Type: Mosque
- Style: Ottoman (originally Seljuk)
- Established: 14th Century
- Completed: 1884

Specifications
- Minaret: 2
- Materials: Stone

The Great Mosque (Turkish: Büyük Cami) is a historic stone mosque situated in İlkadım, Samsun, Turkey. The mosque was first built during the Seljuk period in the 1300s. The original structure caught fire in 1869 and was rebuilt in 1884. Today it is one of Samsun's most beautiful and historical mosques. The Great Mosque is located adjacent to the Samsun Clock Tower and Samsun Saathane Square.

== History ==
The Great Mosque (Turkish: Büyük Cami) is one of the oldest surviving mosques in Samsun. The original Great Mosque was built in the 14th century by Hidir Bey, a military commander in the Seljuk period. The original mosque was built of wood, like most structures in Samsun, but was destroyed during the Great Fire of Samsun in 1869. In the years following, the site was cleared, and a new mosque made of stone was constructed. In 1884 the new mosque was opened for public use. The stone structure was designed by Batumlu Haci Ali. Sultan Abdul Haziz's mother funded the construction of this mosque. As a result of her involvement and funding of the construction, the mosque is also colloquially known as the Valide (mother) Mosque.

== Architecture ==
The mosque is located in a large tree-filled courtyard adjacent to Samsun Saathane Square. The mosque is made of cut stone. The central dome of the mosque is decorated with floral and geometric patterns. The structure has two large minarets on its western frontage. Both minarets have balconies and a simple stonework finish. The mosque has large arched windows which let in an abundance of natural light. There is an ornate central chandelier in the main prayer space.

The Mosque is serviced by the Büyük Cami Station of the Samsun Tram, and is visible from Ataturk Boulevard.

== Gallery ==
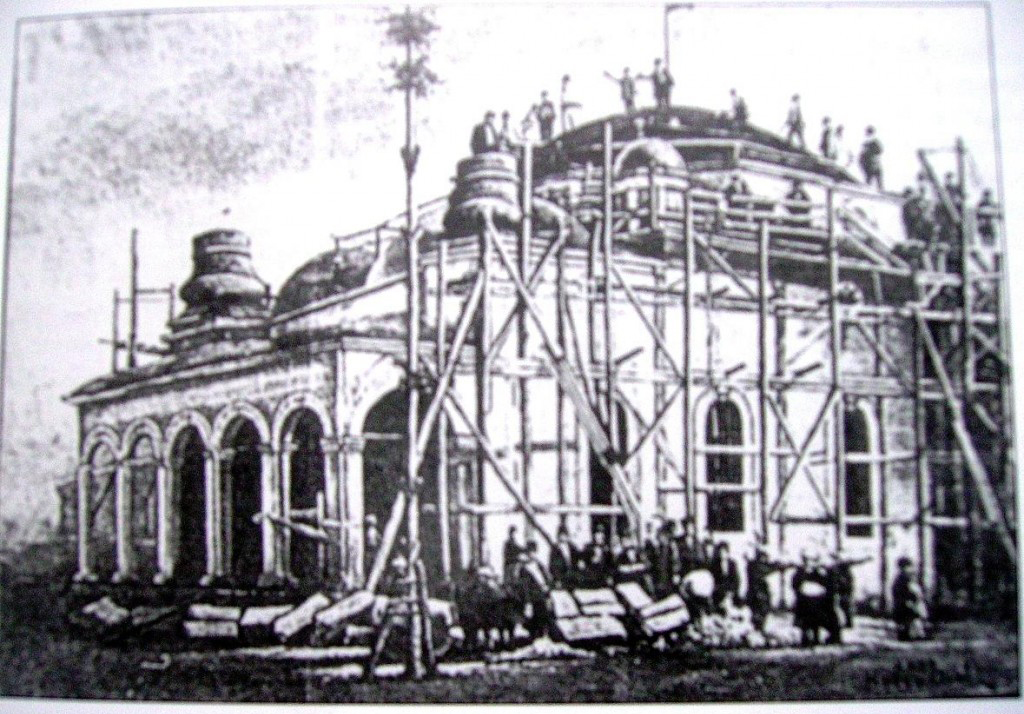
The Great Mosque while under construction in 1883

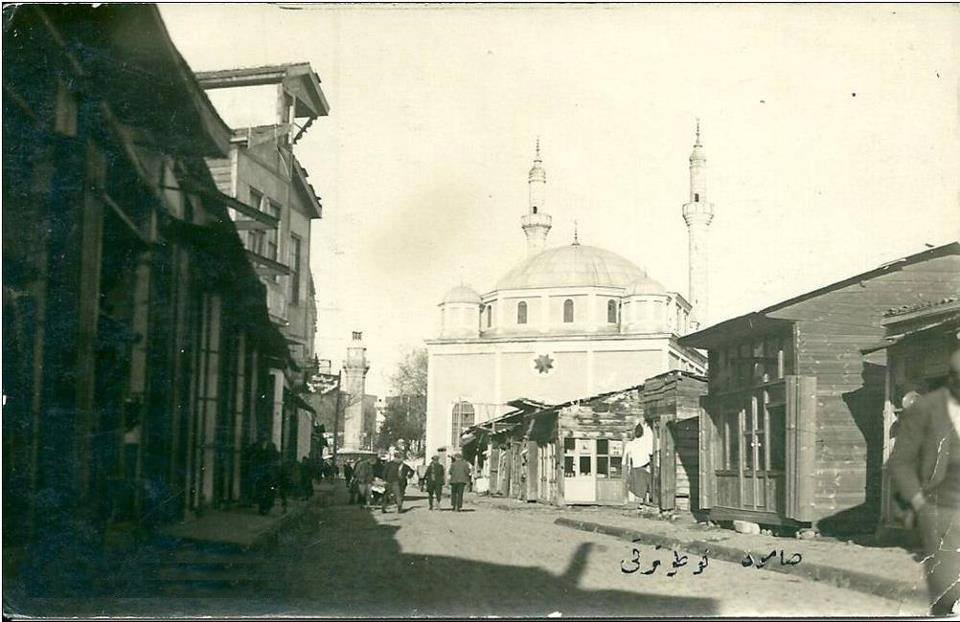
The Great Mosque and Samsun Clock Tower
