= Site Mosque =

20th-century mosque in Samsun, Turkey

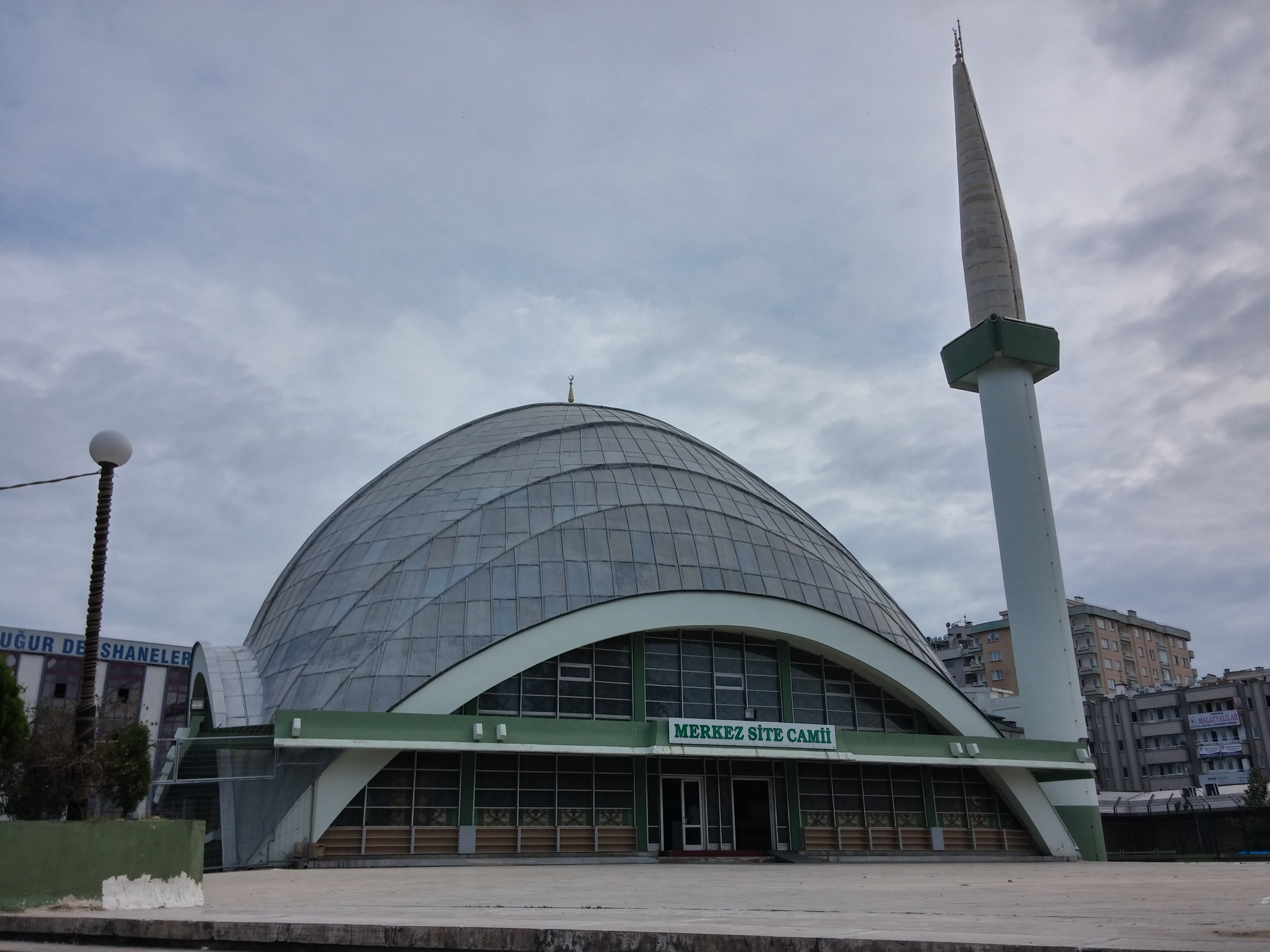

Religion
- Affiliation: Sunni Islam

Location
- Location: Ilkadim, Samsun, Turkey
- Interactive map of Site Mosque
- Coordinates: 41°17′18″N 36°20′02″E

Architecture
- Architects: Sevinç Şahin, Vedat İşbilir
- Type: Mosque
- Style: Modern
- Groundbreaking: 1976; 50 years ago
- Completed: 1985; 41 years ago

Specifications
- Dome height (outer): 21 m (69 ft)
- Dome dia. (inner): 28.80 m (94.5 ft)
- Minaret: 1
- Minaret height: 48 m (157 ft)
- Materials: Concrete

Site Mosque is a mosque located in Ilkadim district of Samsun, Turkey. The mosque is a prominent architectural landmark in the city center due to both its location and unique architectural style. It was built between 1976 and 1985 as part of a redevelopment of the city center. Plans were announced in 2022 to demolish the mosque as part of an urban renewal campaign of Samsun's City Center.

== History ==
The Site Mosque is located in the center of Samsun between Republic Square (Samsun), Anit Park and the Bulvar Shopping Center. By the 1970s the area which was once a prosperous residential and commercial district was increasingly derelict and home to many of the city's brothels which catered to sailors, tobacco factory workers and other travelers. In 1972 in an attempt to revitalize the area, the Samsun municipal government announced an urban renewal campaign that centered on the construction of a modern and eye-catching mosque. In order to realize this idea, the Islamic Religious Site and Central Mosque Construction and Sustainability Association was established on June 15, 1972. A project competition was held by the municipality to build a mosque with the Külliye structure. On November 4, 1973, Vedat İşbilir from the Istanbul State Academy of Fine Arts and Sevinç Şahin from the Gazi University were selected as the lead design team.

Between 1972 and 1976, the Samsun Municipality proceeded to buy, vacate and demolish the dilapidated historic structures within the bounds of Mevlevi, Gazi and Osmaniye streets. The area cleared for construction totaled 9,736 square meters. The parcels were graded and consolidated in preparation of construction of the new mosque. Construction on the mosque began on February 15, 1976. The first phase of the project opened in 1979 and the second part in December 1985. Since its opening, the area has been revitalized with investments in the neighboring tobacco factory which has since been renovated and turned into a shopping mall. The area is now adjacent to Republic Square (Samsun) and the Samsun Tram.

== Restoration ==
As a result of poor craftsmanship, the dome, which was covered with 10x15 cm ceramics, suffered severe water damage and required extensive restoration effort only a few years after its completion. The dome was initially covered with fiberglass. This material was removed but the mosque continued to struggle with water damage and cracks. The Samsun Islamic Foundation, formerly known as the İslam Diyanet and Merkez Mosque Construction and Sustainability Association, implemented a polyester finish to the dome in an attempt to resolve the issue. Finally, in 2002, the polyester finish, steel cages and ceramics on the dome were completely disassembled and the dome was renovated for six months. The restored dome was covered with lead and replaced and the dome was permanently repaired at a cost of approximately ₺110,000. Carpets, interior equipment, ablution room and toilets were also renewed during this repair at a cost of approximately ₺90,000.

== Future ==
In 2022 after many years of issues with the maintenance of the mosque, the Samsun Metropolitan Municipality announced that the structure would be demolished. The mosque along with a neighboring tax office building and a municipal building will be demolished as part of a renovation of Republic Square and Anit Park. A new much larger mosque to be built in Ottoman Style was announced in the expanded National Garden next to Piazza Samsun mall. Central Site Mosque Protection and Sustenance Association Vice President Miraç Baloğlu made the announcement stating: "The boulevard and the shopping center are planned to be combined and the mosque to be demolished."
