= Yusuf Ziya Yılmaz =

Turkish politician (born 1951)

Yusuf Ziya Yılmaz MP
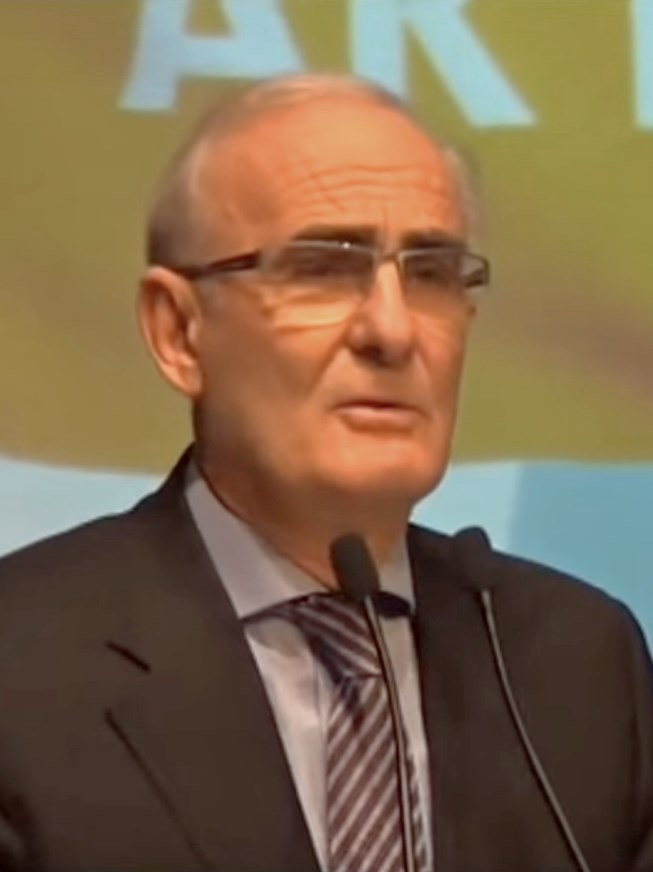
- Yusuf Ziya Yılmaz in 2015

Mayor of Samsun Metropolitan Municipality
- In office 18 April 1999 – 26 April 2018
- Preceded by: Muzaffer Önder
- Succeeded by: Zihni Şahin

Member of the Grand National Assembly
- Incumbent
- Assumed office 7 June 2018
- Constituency: Samsun (2018, 2023)

Personal details
- Born: August 28, 1951 (age 75) Çarşamba, Samsun, Turkey
- Party: AK Party
- Spouse: Semiha Yılmaz
- Education: Yıldız Technical University Mechanical Engineering Department

Yusuf Ziya Yılmaz (born August 28, 1951) is a Turkish engineer and politician who served as the mayor of Samsun Metropolitan Municipality between 1999 and 2018. Yılmaz succeeded Muzaffer Önder, who served as mayor between 1989 and 1999. Yılmaz is remembered for his leadership during a time of significant reform and development in Metropolitan Samsun.

== Early life ==
Yılmaz was born in the Çarşamba district of Samsun in 1951. After completing his primary, secondary and high school education in Samsun, he graduated from Yıldız Technical University Mechanical Engineering Department, which was then called Istanbul State Engineering and Architecture Academy. Yılmaz started his career as a highway engineer in 1975. After being appointed as the Chief Machinery Supply Engineer to the Ankara Highways 4th Regional Directorate in 1983, he was appointed to the General Directorate of Highways Supply Branch Manager in 1987. He was appointed to the 11th Regional Directorate of Van Highways in 1990 and to the 7th Regional Directorate of Samsun Highways in 1992. After working in Samsun for six years, he was appointed to the 17th Regional Directorate of Istanbul Highways.

== Mayor of Samsun ==
While Yusuf Ziya Yılmaz was serving as the 17th Regional Director of Highways, he was nominated by Mesut Yılmaz as the Samsun Mayoral Candidate for the 1999 Turkish local elections on February 1, 1999, by the Motherland Party. He took over the presidency from CHP's Muzaffer Önder with 28.00% of the votes in the elections held on April 18, 1999. Yılmaz also presided over Samsunspor for 1.5 years during his first term as mayor. He resigned from the Motherland Party before the 2004 elections and joined the Ak Party on 18 November 2003. Yılmaz was nominated as the Ak Party candidate for the mayorship of Samsun. On February 14, 2004, he was re-elected mayor, receiving 46.30% of votes.

Yılmaz was nominated for the third time for the 2009 local elections on January 12, 2009. He comfortably won a third term with 48.45% of the votes. During this period of his presidency, the 16-kilometer Samsun Tram began service to great fanfare. On December 3, 2013, Yusuf Ziya Yılmaz was nominated for a fourth term during the 2014 Turkish local elections.

Yılmaz's legacy in Samsun is one of rapid economic development, urbanization and public works projects. During his mayoralty, several major boulevards, the Samsun Tram, Piazza Samsun , Samsun 19 Mayıs Stadium, Samsun Stadium, University of Samsun, and Sheraton Hotel Samsun.

== Parliament ==
Yılmaz, resigned from his position as mayor on April 26, 2018, in order to become a parliamentary candidate on behalf of Ak Party. He elected to the Turkish Grand National Assembly as a Samsun deputy in the 2018 Turkish parliamentary election.

== Personal life ==
Yusuf Ziya Yılmaz is married to Semiha Yılmaz, a former history teacher. The couple has no children.
