= Köksal Ersayın Anatolian High School =

Secondary school in Samsun, Turkey

Köksal Ersayın Anatolian High School (Turkish: Köksal Ersayın Anadolu Lisesi) is a secondary school in the borough of İlkadım in Samsun, Turkey.

== History ==
In 2003, 73 people donated land to build the school, 12,900 square meters in size. The Former mayor of Ilkadım Necmi AKKOYUNLU, and then Mayor of Ilkadım Erdoğan TOK, supported the building of the school. The school was built by the Samsun Metropolitan Municipality and businessman Köksal Ersayın in 2009–10, opened in 2010.

The high school has 24 classrooms with interactive boards, a computer classroom, science labs, a library and visual arts classroom, and sports and activity fields.
