= Samsun Gazi Museum =

Museum in Samsun, Turkey

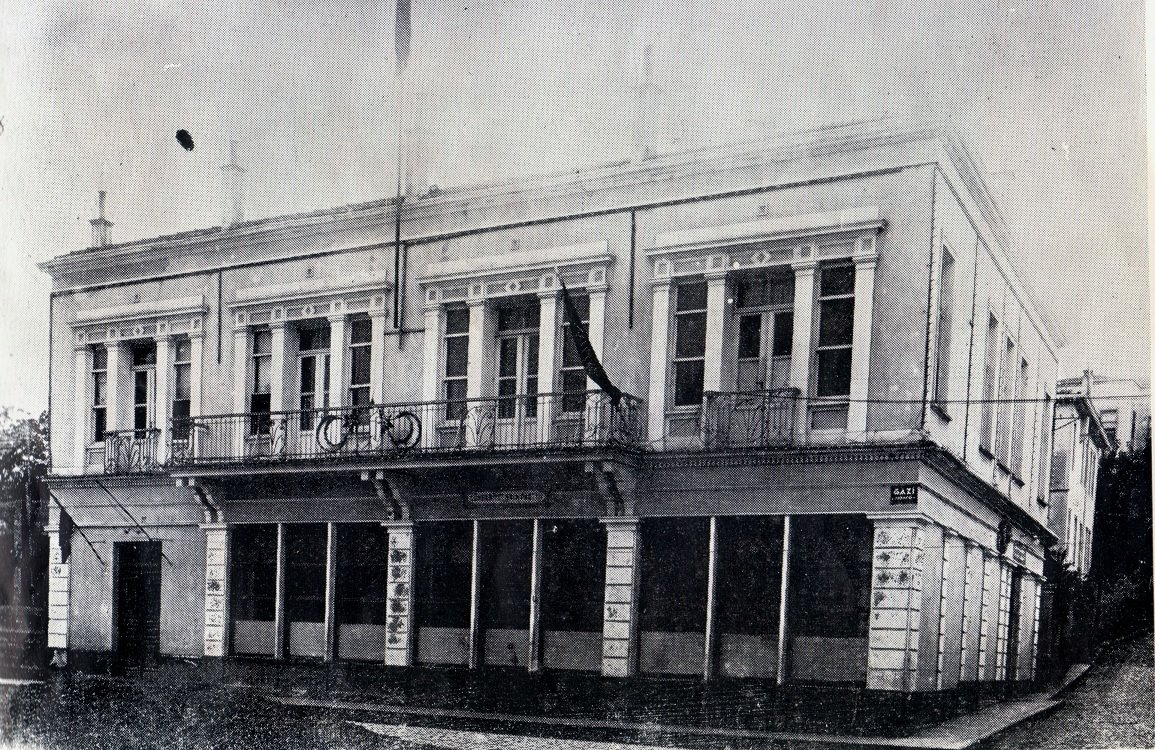
Mıntıka Palas in Samsun, Turkey

Samsun Gazi Museum (Turkish: Samsun Gazi Müzesi) is a museum dedicated to Mustafa Kemal Atatürk in Samsun, Turkey.

The museum is at 41°17′25″N 36°19′57″E in the secondary municipality of İlkadım. It is situated in Mecidiye Cad. at Kale neighborhood in the city center. It is a two-story building constructed in brick masonry while the interior walls ate of timber-work.

Atatürk is the founder of Turkey. His arrival in Samsun on 19 May 1919 is considered as the starting point of Turkish War of Independence. (see Commemoration of Atatürk, Youth and Sports Day) When Atatürk arrived in Samsun, he stayed in a former hotel named Mantika Palas. The hotel was built in 1902 and in 1919 it was non operational. But it was opened for Atatürk to be used as his headquarters. The building was donated to him by the residents during his second visit to Samsun on September 20–24, 1924. He stayed in the building during his further visits on September 16–18, 1928 and November 22–26, 1930. The building was left over from the city municipality to the Ministry of Culture and Tourism, and was opened as a museum after restoration works on November 8, 1998. Up to 1998 there was another museum named Atatürk Museum in Samsun. On 22 May 2006 both museums were merged by transferring the exhibited items in the former museum (including the 18 wax sculptures) to Mıntıka Palas both museums were merged.

== See also ==
- Samsun Atatürk Museum
