= Samsun Atatürk Museum =

Museum in Turkey

Samsun Atatürk Museum (Turkish: Samsun Atatürk Müzesi) is a former history museum in Samsun, northern Turkey dedicated to Mustafa Kemal Atatürk.

The museum is situated inside the old fair ground, and was opened to public as the "19 May Gallery" on July 1, 1968. It exhibits 114 items belonging to Mustafa Kemal Atatürk (1881–1938), the founder of modern Turkey, who set foot in Samsun on May 19, 1919, to start the Turkish War of Independence.

== See also ==
- Samsun Gazi Museum
