= Samsun Saathane Square =

District in Samsun, Turkey

Saathane Square
- Public square
- {{{other_names}}}
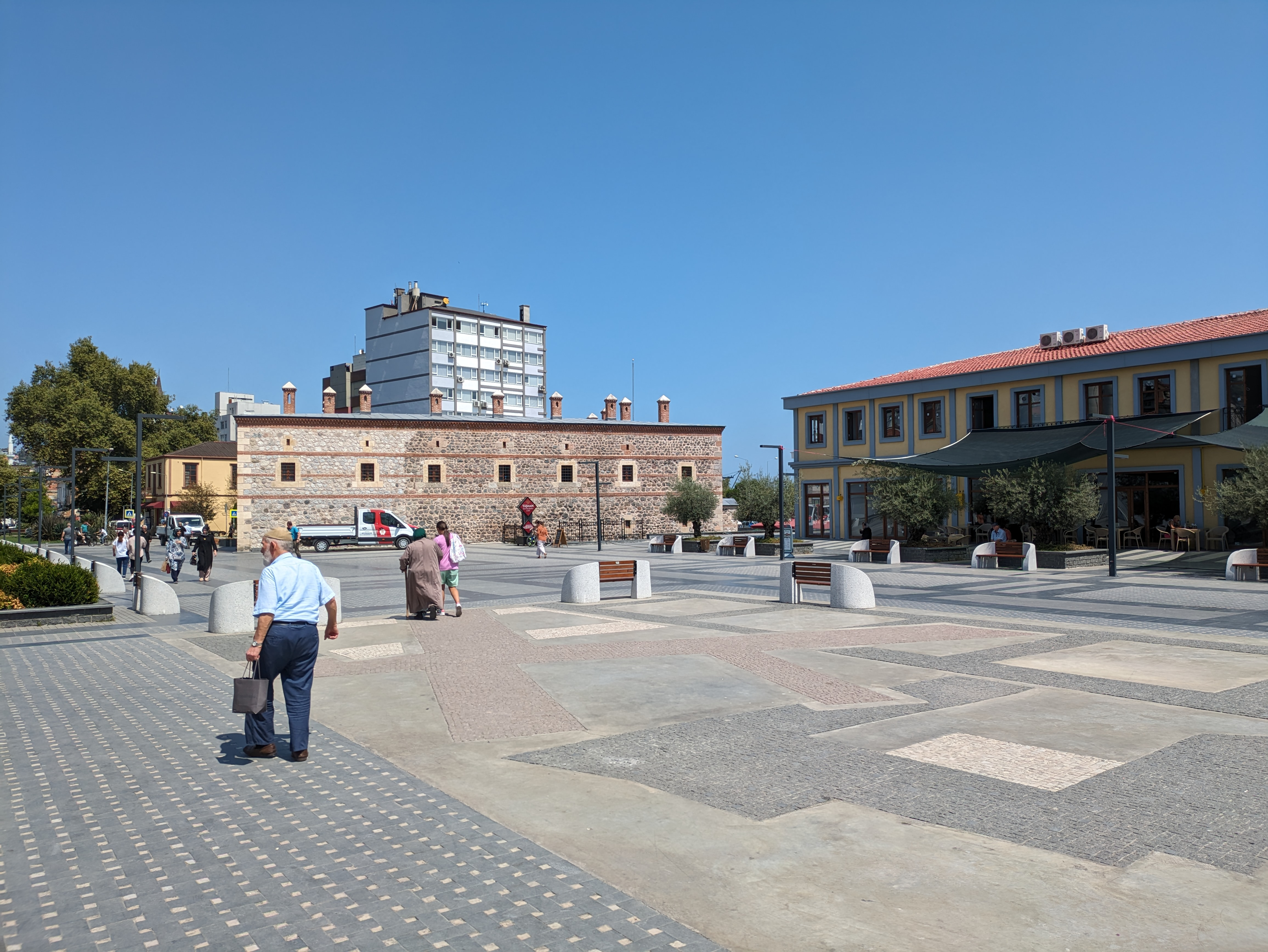
- Saathane Square in 2023
- Features: Samsun Clock Tower, Samsun Central Great Mosque, Şifa Bath, Samsun Metropolitan Municipality Headquarters and the Medrese Mosque
- Location: Samsun, Turkey
- Interactive map of Saathane Square
- Coordinates: 41.2953°N 36.3323°E

Saathane Square is a public square in Samsun's Ilkadim district and takes its name from the Samsun Clock Tower which is located in the center of the square. Along with Republic Square (Samsun), it is one of two important and historical squares in Samsun. The square is bounded by the headquarters of the Samsun Metropolitan Municipal Government, Central Great Mosque (Samsun), Taş Han, the Şifa Bath and the Medrese Mosque.

== History ==
Saathane Square is a historical center in Samsun. The oldest building in the square is the Samsun Taş Han which was constructed in the 13th Century by members of the Seljuk Empire. The neighboring Şifa Bath was constructed in the 15th century and was followed by the construction of the Samsun Central Great Mosque in 1803 and the Samsun Clock Tower in 1887. The Samsun Clock Tower was erected to commemorate the ascension of Sultan Abdülhamit II to the throne. Samsun was struck by an earthquake in 1948 causing the original Samsun Clock Tower to collapse. The tower was rebuilt in 1977. A restoration of the clock tower was done between 2000 and 2001.

Starting in 2017, the Samsun Metropolitan Municipality began a major restoration project of the square and its environs. The objective of the urban renewal project is to restore important works of Ottoman architecture within and adjacent to the square. As a result, several adjacent dilapidated buildings were demolished and replaced with neo-ottoman retail architecture. A formerly vacant parking lot was restored with a pedestrianized brick paver square. The restoration of Saathane Square was done with the objective of reviving the city's historic architecture, urban fabric and again uniting the Taş Han, Medrese Mosque and the Şifa Bath. The municipality has stated that they hope the project will revive the tourism economy and restore a sense of commercial vitality to the area.

As of 2023, the project was partially complete. Three new retail buildings have been constructed with 1 under-construction and 3 more planned. The project has entailed the clearance of two unpermitted city blocks worth of construction. The new buildings follow a neo-ottoman architecture style.

The square is serviced by the Large Mosque stop on the Samsun Tram.

== Gallery ==
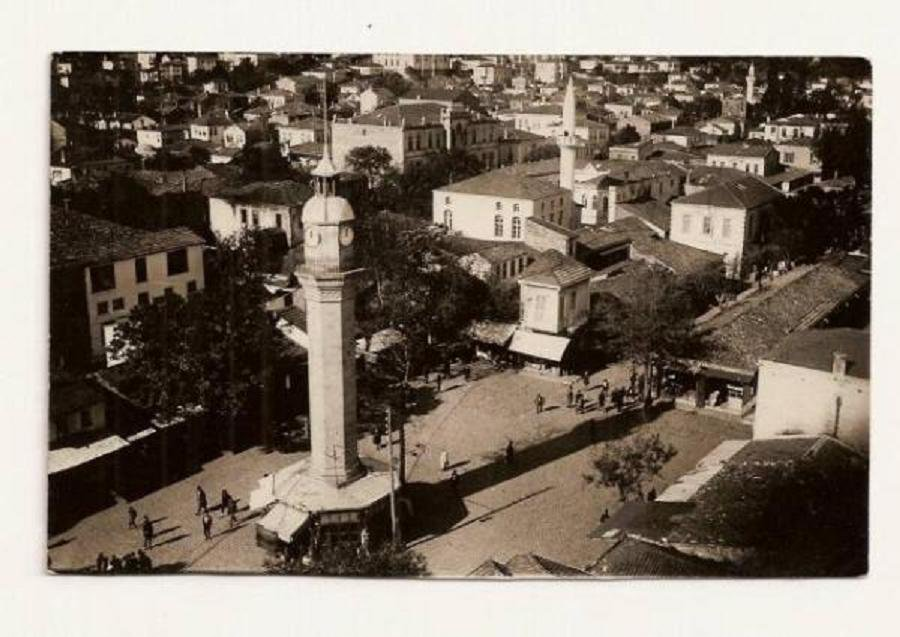
A view from the square in the 1920s. There are vendors at the base of the clock tower.

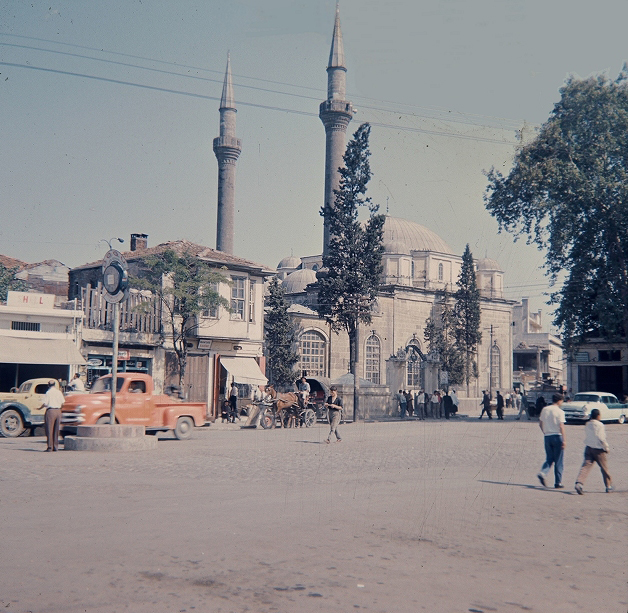
The clock tower was damaged and demolished after the earthquake. The photo belongs to the days of Saathane Square without a tower.

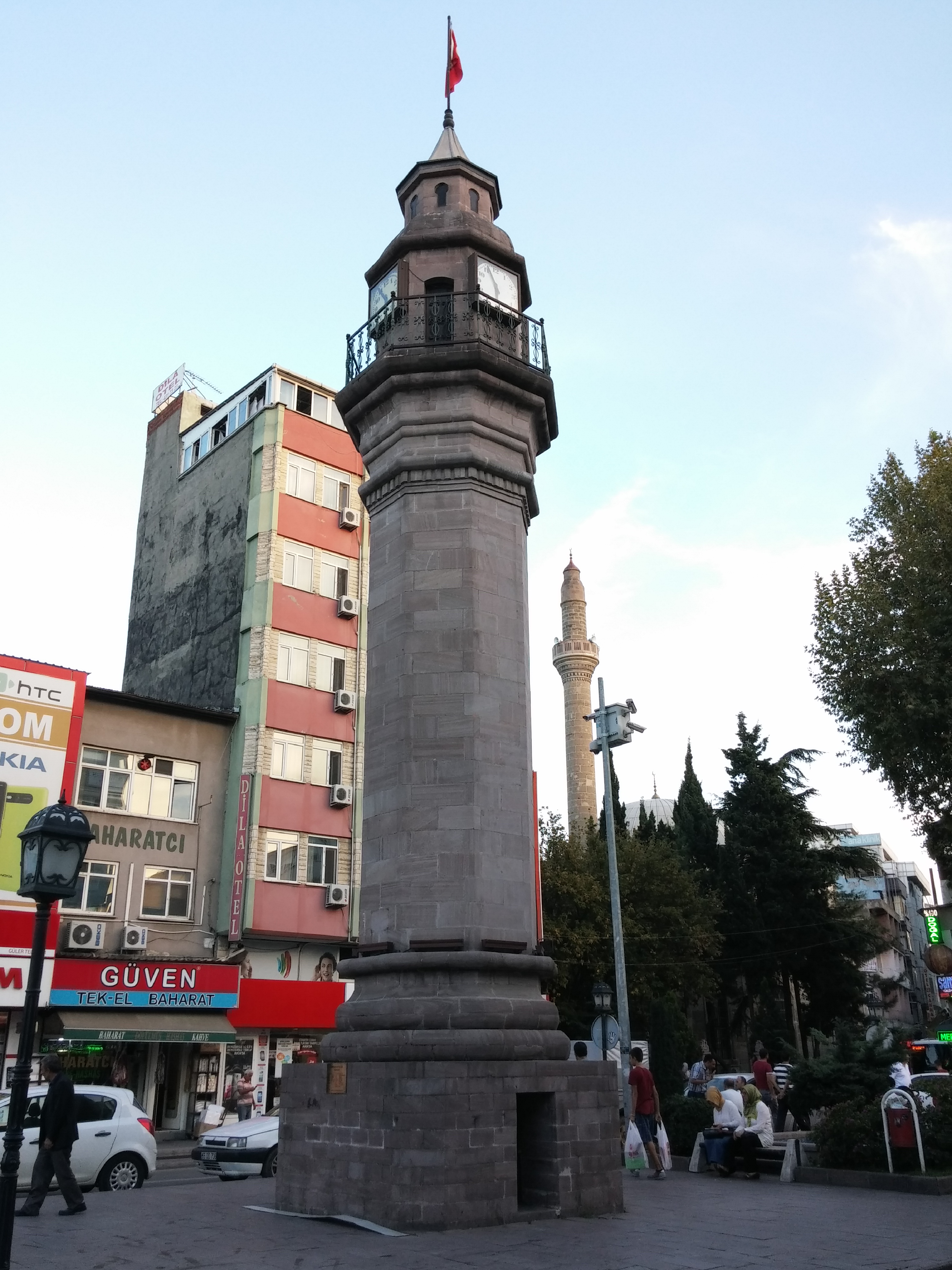
The condition of the clock tower in 2015

== See also ==
- Samsun Clock Tower
