= Kadifekale, İlkadım =

Kadifekale
- Neighbourhood
- Location within Turkey
- Coordinates: 41°18′7″N 36°19′16″E
- Country: Turkey
- Province: Samsun
- District: İlkadım
- Population (2022): 11,214
- Time zone: UTC+3 (TRT)

Kadifekale is a neighbourhood of the municipality and district of İlkadım, Samsun Province, Turkey. Its population is 11,214 (2022). It lies between two military areas. It is separated from Baruthane by a dried river and located on a slope. The dock and Black Sea are visible from the neighbourhood.
