= Gökdelen Towers =

Skyscraper in Samsun, Turkey

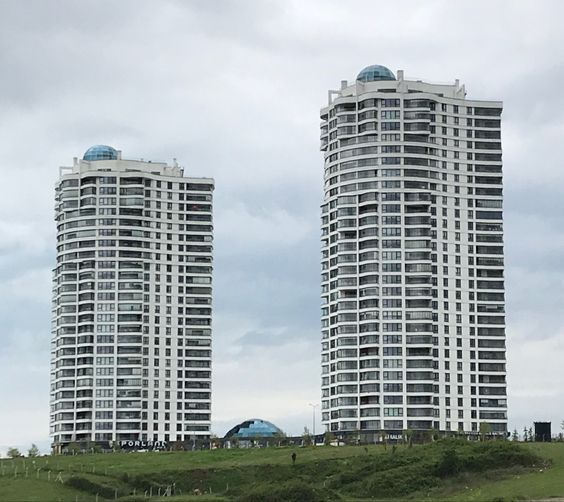
- Interactive map of the Gökdelen Towers area

General information
- Status: Completed
- Architectural style: Modernism
- Classification: Residential
- Location: Bünyan Cd, Samsun, Turkey
- Coordinates: 41.3119°N 36.2780°E
- Groundbreaking: 2012
- Opened: 2018

Height
- Height: 378 feet (115 m)

Technical details
- Material: Concrete
- Size: 212 condominiums
- Floor count: 30
- Floor area: 625,000 sq ft (58,100 m^{2})

Design and construction
- Architect: Cengiz Şentürk
- Architecture firm: Arkiv
- Developer: STU Construction
- Structural engineer: Tek-Ar Engineering

Gökdelen Towers is a two-tower luxury residential complex located in Samsun, Turkey. Construction of the two buildings began in 2012 and was completed in 2018. The development consists of two high-rise residential towers. Tower One stands 378 feet (115 m) and 30 floors. Tower Two stands 340 feet (100 m) and 27 floors. The complex has 212 residential units and is 625,000 square feet. Gökdelen Tower One is the tallest building in Samsun Province and the Central Black Sea region.

== History ==
The towers are set at one of the highest points in Samsun and offer expansive views of the surrounding region. Samsun's rapid economic and population development has led to the construction of a new generation of high-rise apartment buildings. Upon Gökdelen Towers completion in 2018, Tower One surpassed the Sheraton Hotel Samsun as the tallest building in the region, Tower Two is the third tallest in the Samsun region. The towers are located in a formerly rural district of Samsun called Büyükkolpınar which has rapidly developed since the economic liberalization of Turkey in the early 2000s. The building is in close proximity to neighboring Atakum, Ondokuz Mayıs University and the Samsun City Center at the junction of Bünyan Cd and Recep Tayyip Erdoğan Boulevard.

In 2016, construction on the project was temporarily halted due to financial irregularities. Controversy arose during the construction and development of the project due to the involvement of local officials and the use of municipal vehicles for site preparation. The height of the two towers drew criticism due to their impact on Samsun's otherwise low-rise skyline. Since their construction, several other mid and high-rise buildings have been built in the region.

== Design ==
The two buildings are of concrete frame construction and furnished with modern exterior finishes. Both towers are whitewashed, with all units outfitted with large balconies and windows. Construction of the development was undertaken by Stu Construction. Arkiv was the architectural firm responsible for the design with Cengiz Şentürk serving as the lead architect. Büşra Karatay, Hakan Düzen and Ceren Şentürk served as contributing architects to the project Units range in size from 240 to 310 square metres (2,600 to 3,300 sq ft). The complex has a pool and other community amenity spaces.
