= Surgical Instruments and Health Museum =

- Cerrahi Aletler ve Sağlık Müzesi
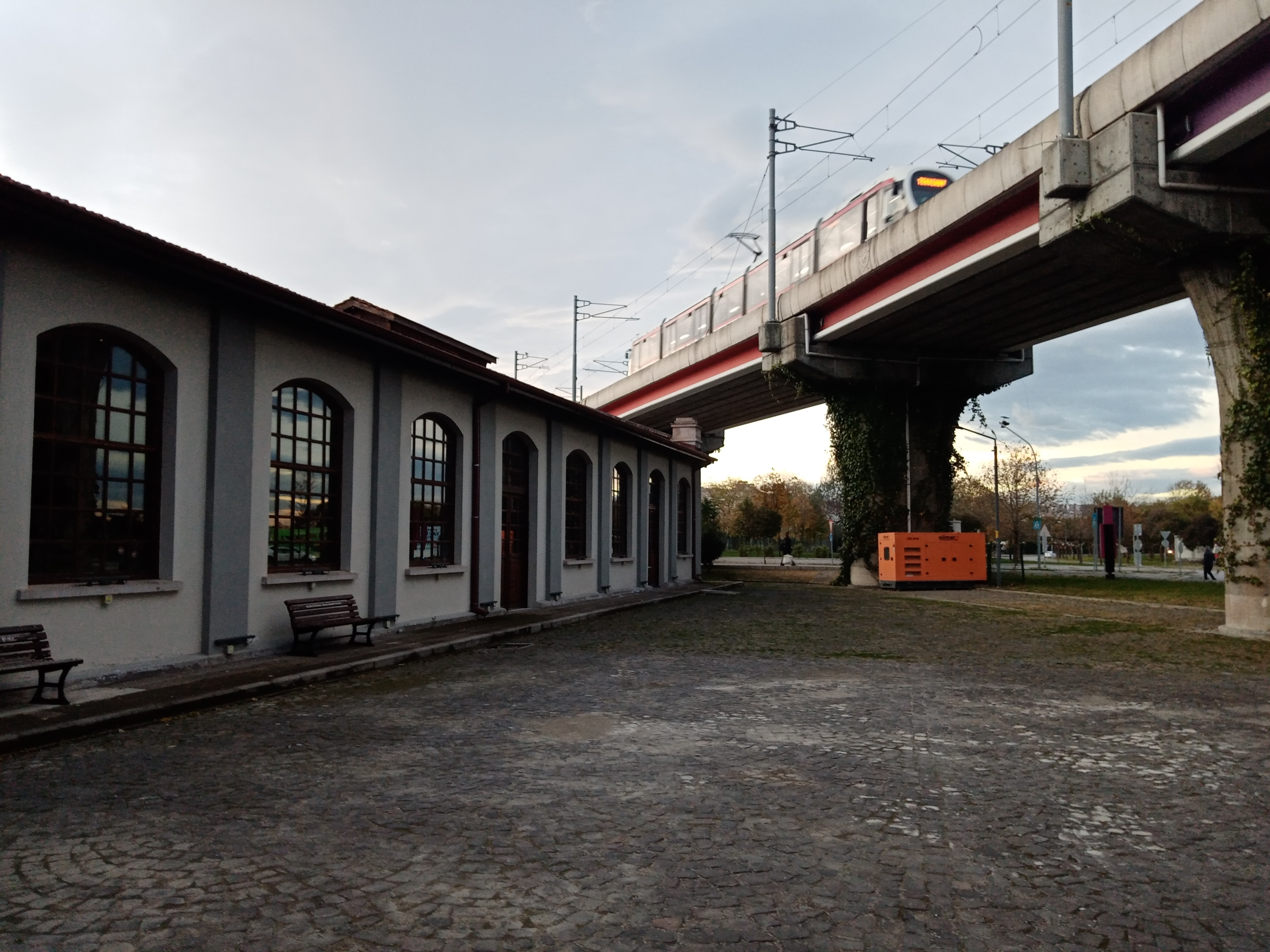
- Established: 3 December 2021; 4 years ago
- Location: İlkadım, Samsun, Turkey
- Coordinates: 41.28075°N 36.34977°E
- Type: Medical museum
- Collections: Surgical instruments and medical objects
- Collection size: over 15,000
- Website: www.cerrahimuze.org

Surgical Instruments and Health Museum (Turkish: Cerrahi Aletler ve Sağlık Müzesi) is a medical museum in Samsun, Turkey exhibiting historical surgical instruments and medical objects. Housed in a former locomotive depot, it was founded by the city of Samsun in cooperation with many local institutions at the end of 2021.

== History ==
The museum is located at Fuar Alanı Kümesi St. 47 in Kılıçdede neighborhood of İlkadım district in Samsun, Turkey. Samsun is well-known as a production place of surgical instruments, many medical devices from orthopedic implants to autoclaves, hearing aids and X-ray devices.

During excavations in 1974, obsidian scalpels for use in skull base surgery, being older than 2100 BC of the Bronze Age, were found at İkiztepe Mound in Samsun's Bafra district.

The museum is situated in a former locomotive depot of Turkish State Railways (TCDD), which was built in 1926 for the repair and maintenance of the locomotives serving on the Samsun-Sivas railway line. It was built on a 8,130 m^{2} (87,500 sq ft) ground occupying 1,382 m^{2} (14,880 sq ft) floor space.

The project for the redevelopment of the former locomotive depot into a museum started in 2016. The restoration of the structure was carried out with contributions of the Samsun Governorship, Samsun Metropolitan Municipality, Middle Black Sea Development Agency, Ondokuz Mayıs University, Samsun Provincial Health Directorate, Samsun Provincial Directorate of Culture and Samsun Medical Innovation Cluster Association (MEDİKÜM). In July 2019, the museum's operation was transferred to MEDİKÜM.

== Museum ==
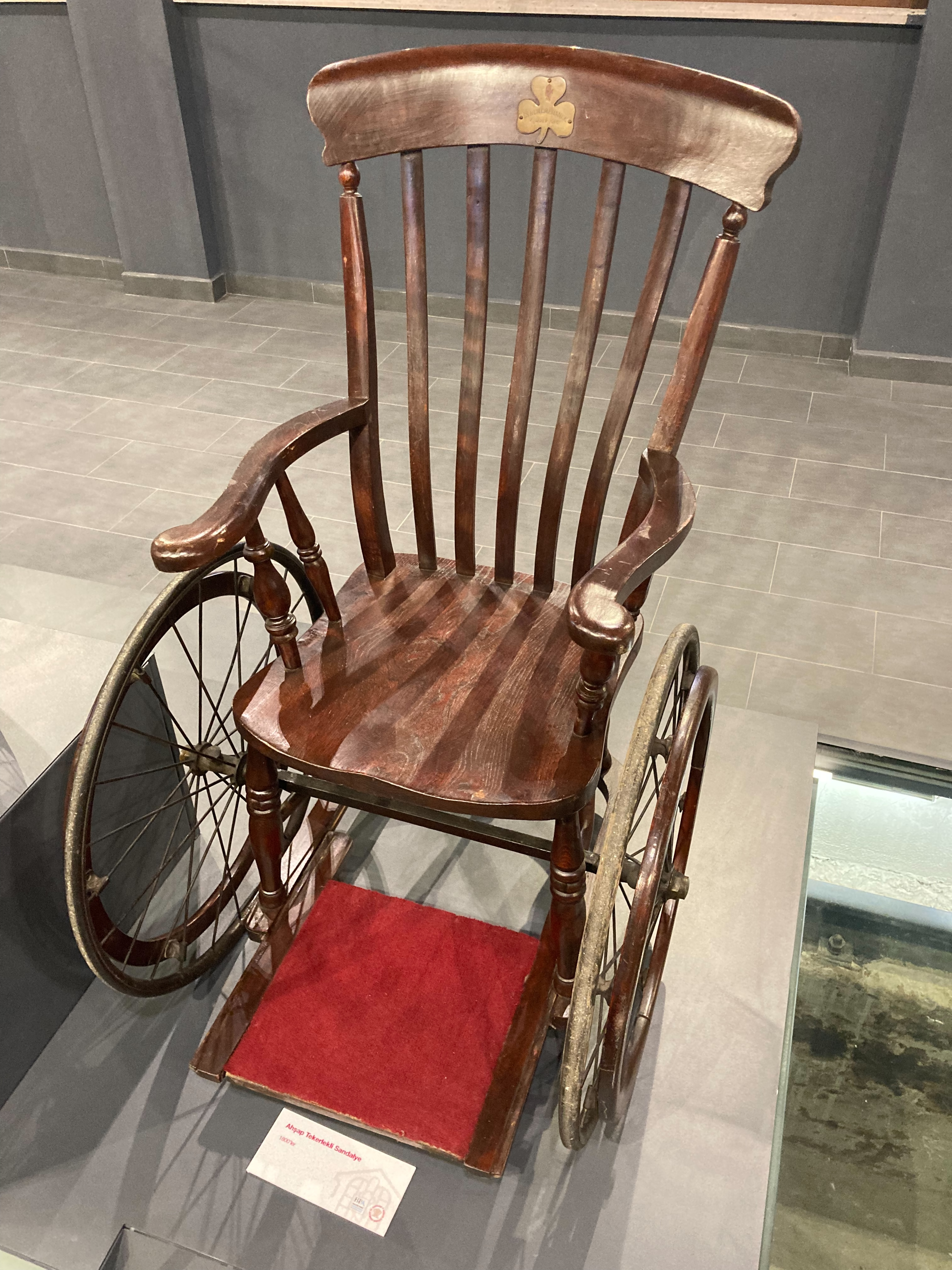
Wheelchair

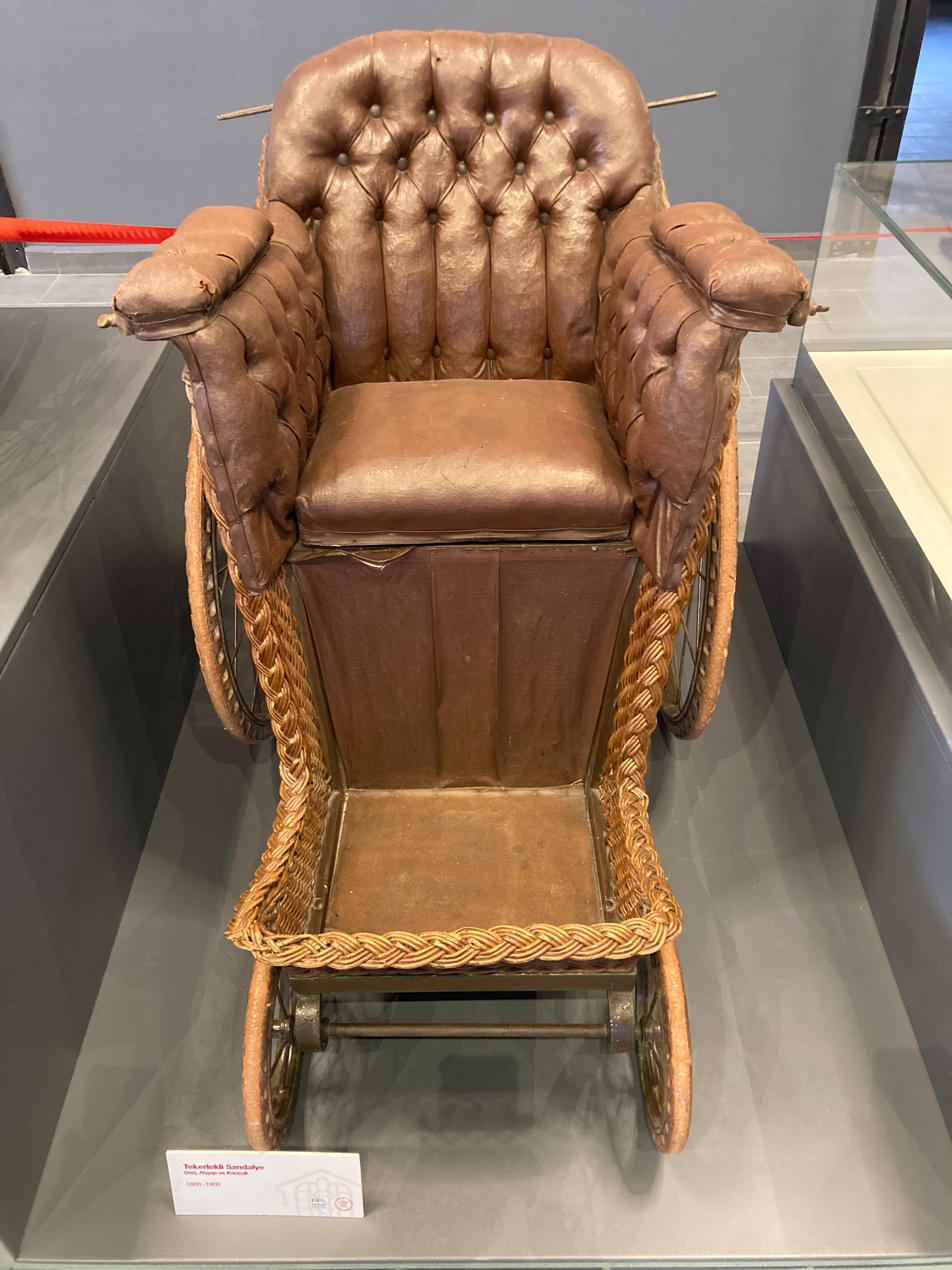
Wheelchair

Opened on 3 December 2021, on the United Nations' International Day of Persons with Disabilities with a seminar held on "Patient Care and Movement Support", the museum was operated by the MEDİKÜM. The museum owns a collection of over 15,000 historical surgical instruments and medical objects. The objects exhibited in the museum generally belong to the 18th and 19th centuries. Surgical instruments used during the Gallipoli campaign (1915-1916) of World War I and the Turkish War of Independence (1919-1922) are also on display.

At the entrance of the museum, there are 18th-century patient chairs and prosthesis-orthotics. The objects in the middle axis are 19th-century wooden room chair, potty holder commode, discharge containers, thermophores of the 1900s, hygienic vaginal syringes used in the 1920s,walking sticks and crutches, scales, sick chairs, massage tools, backscratchers. There are 19th-century built UV radiation device, prosthesis-orthotics, hernia bends and stretchers from the 1800s.

Exhibition Hall 1 is decorated as a General Surgery Hall, which contains autoclave sterilisation devices from the 1900s, surgical cutting tools, surgical instruments used in obstetrics and gynecology. There are dental instruments and an eye examination set in the Hall 2. There is a painting exhibition in Hall 3. In Hall 4, there are surgical hand tools produced by the member companies of Samsun MEDİKÜM.

On the second floor, there is a 180 m^{2} (1,900 sq ft) hall, where private and public institutions can hold meetings. The museum hosts special events, workshops, exhibitions and activities related to health.

The museum is open from 9:00 to 17:00, except Mondays.
