= Turgut Toydemir =

Turkish architect (1938–2024)

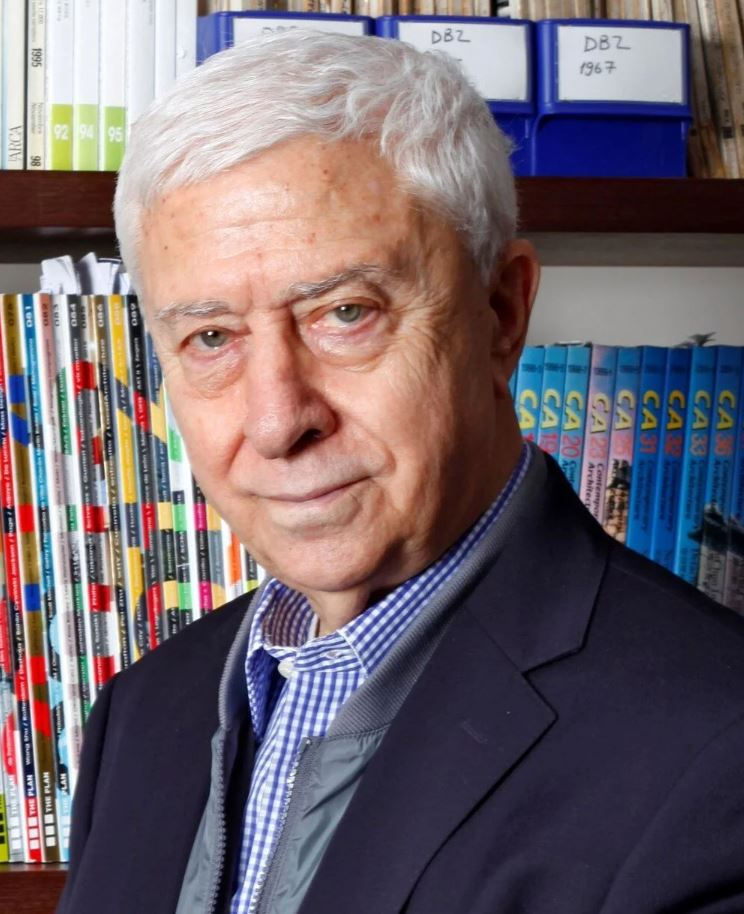
- Turgut Toydemir (2017)
- Born: 13 July 1938; Istanbul, Turkey
- Died: 20 December 2024 (aged 86); Istanbul, Turkey
- Education: Vefa High School; Istanbul Technical University (BArch); Yıldız Technical University (MArch)
- Occupation: Architect
- Buildings: Shangri-La Bosphorus

Turgut Toydemir (13 July 1938 – 20 December 2024) was a Turkish architect.

== Life and career ==
Turgut Toydemir was born in 1938 in Istanbul. He spent his childhood in the Sultanselim neighbourhood of the Fatih district. He went to highschool in the Çarşamba neighbourhood. In that period he would get the hang of architecture by hanging around the neighborhood with his childhood friend Ersen Gürsel who would also become an architect. Toydemir graduated from Vefa High School in 1957.

Toydemir graduated in 1961 from the Istanbul Technical University's Faculty of Architecture. He established his own office, which would become known as Turgut Toydemir Piramit Architecture. As a young architect he not only drew the architectural design, but also did the structural calculations and site supervision.

At that time, Istanbul had a population of about one and a half million people, and two-three-storey masonry buildings from the Ottoman times were common. As the zoning plans were made before 1961, 4-5 story buildings were allowed. Thus, Toydemir carried out projects of reinforced concrete as part of the demolition and renewal of old buildings, as well as new building projects.

In 1969, he obtained his master's degree at what is today called the Yıldız Technical University.

Until 1974, he kept doing the structural calculations together with architectural projects. In 1975, he changed the name of his office into Turgut Toydemir Piramit Architecture Urban Planning Engineering and supported this with a branch called Piramit Consultancy Controlling company, which he established in 1980. During those years, Toydemir's work had evolved into a postmodernism style.

According to his own saying, parallel with the economic developments in Turkey, Toydemir worked on different types of building projects and completed architectural projects of various scales, from housing projects to large-scale urban design projects, from health facilities to educational buildings, and from tourism buildings to commercial office buildings and shopping malls. By 2018 he had produced around 70 local development plans and 17 million square meters of urban design and planning projects as a city planner.

On 20 December 2024, at the age of 86, Toydemir was shot and killed by an off-duty police officer in Istanbul during a road rage argument.

== Oeuvre ==
=== Architectural and urban works ===
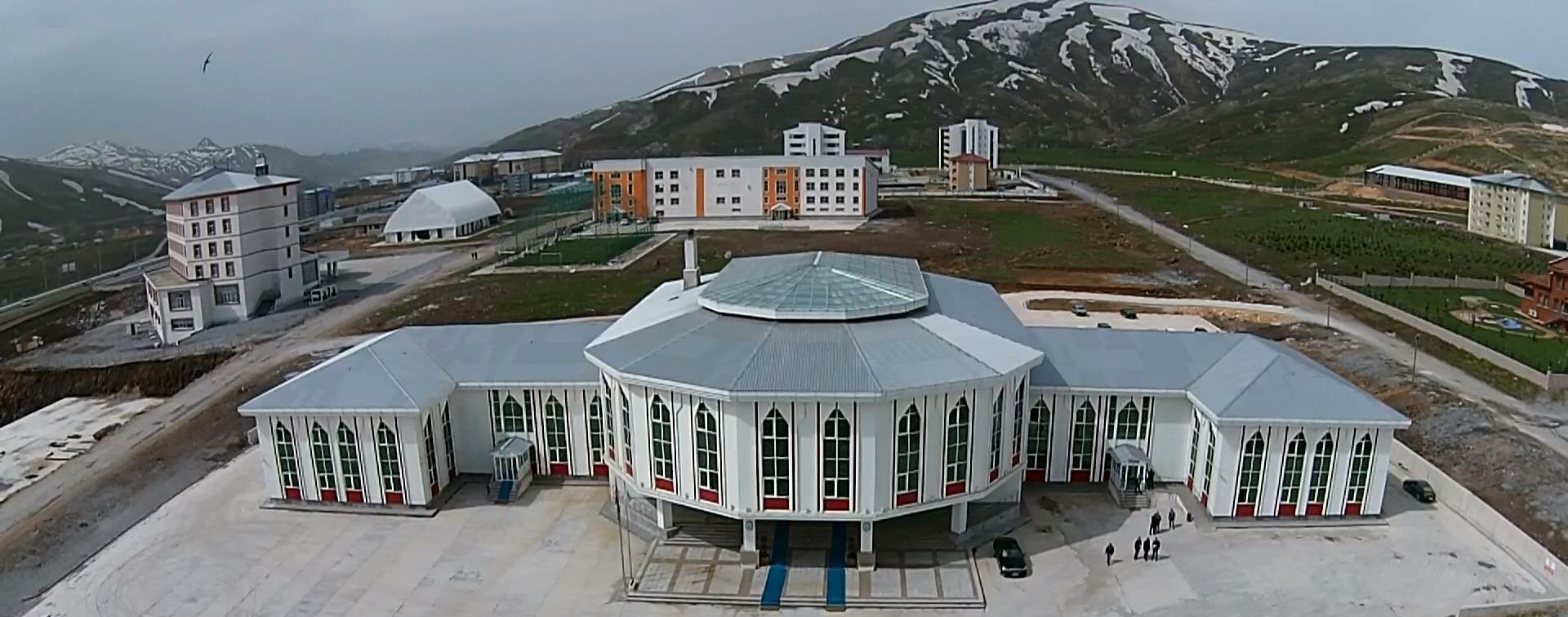
Bitlis Eren University (2013), Bitlis, Turkey

- Bitlis Eren University (2013), Bitlis, Turkey
- Shangri-La Bosphorus Hotel (2013), a historical monument and hotel in Beşiktaş, Turkey
- Sheraton Hotel Samsun (2014), a high-rise building in Samsun, Turkey

=== Architectural works carried out with foreign partners ===
Turgut Toydemir was with his office also a local associate in various projects with foreign architects. These projects are all LEED or BREAAM certified.

- Sabancı University (1999), Tuzla, Istanbul

== See also ==
- List of Turkish architects
