= Sheraton Hotel Samsun =

Hotel in Samsun, Turkey

- Interactive map of the Sheraton Hotel Samsun area

General information
- Status: Completed
- Type: Hotel
- Location: Samsun, Turkey
- Coordinates: 41.315°N 36.336111°E
- Completed: 2015
- Cost: $60 Million

Height
- Height: 377 ft (115 m)

Technical details
- Floor count: 28

Design and construction
- Architect: Turgut Toydemir
- Main contractor: RIC Construction

Other information
- Number of rooms: 221

The Sheraton Hotel Samsun is a hotel in Samsun, Turkey. The hotel is Samsun's second tallest building with 28 floors and a height of 115 meters. The building was completed in 2015 and is located along the seafront of the city to the north of its port on Atatürk Boulevard. The hotel belongs to the Sheraton Hotels and Resorts chain.

== Design and history ==
The hotel was designed by Turkish architect Turgut Toydemir. Construction of the hotel began in 2013 and was completed in late 2015 in anticipation of the 2017 Summer Deaflympics which was held in Samsun, Turkey. The hotel was constructed by RIC Construction on behalf of Tanrıverdi Holdings. The building cost $60 million to complete.

Construction on the hotel was halted in 2013 by court order, whereupon the height of the building was ordered reduced from 160 meters to 115 meters. The court ordered the height reduction as a result of concerns by residents and the Samsun Chamber of Architects about the impact of the building on Samsun's otherwise low-rise skyline and the project's proximity to the Bay of Samsun. The hotel caught fire while under construction in 2014. A contractor was killed during the construction of the building.

The Sheraton Hotel is currently the second tallest building in Samsun Province after the completion of Gökdelen Towers in 2018. The hotel is serviced by the Fener Station of the Samsun Tram.
