= Republic Square (Samsun) =

District in Samsun, Turkey

- Public square
- {{{other_names}}}
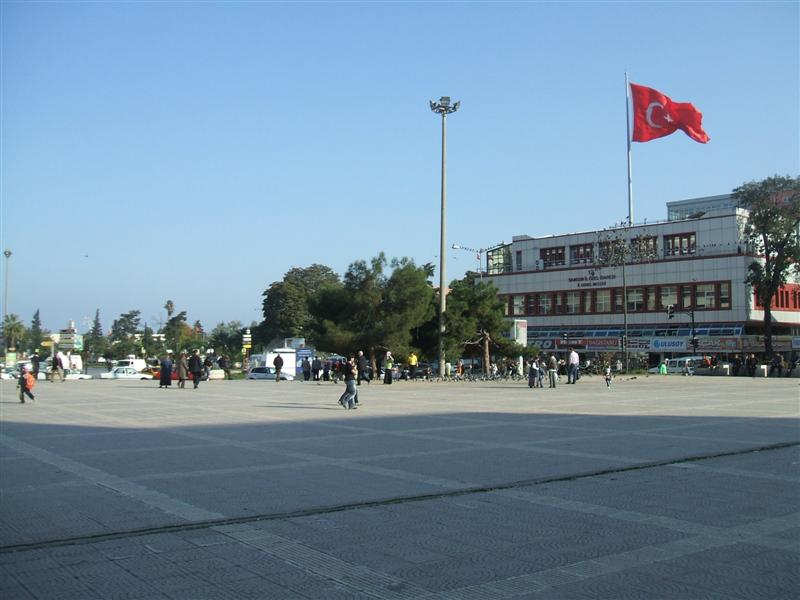
- General view of the square
- Features: Bulvar AVM, Samsun Metropolitan Municipality Council and the Site Mosque
- Surface: 8750 square meters
- Owner: Samsun Municipal Government
- Location: Samsun, Turkey
- Interactive map of Republic Square (Samsun)
- Coordinates: 41.290385°N 36.334129°E

Republic Square (Turkish: Samsun Cumhuriyet Square) is a large public square located in Ilkadim district of Samsun, Turkey. It is one of the two largest and busiest public squares in the center of Samsun including Samsun Saathane Square. The square was established in 1931 and has subsequently been renovated and expanded several times. The square sits atop a large municipal parking garage.

== History ==
Republic Square plays an important role in the history of Samsun and Turkey as it is said to be where the first steps of the Turkish War of Independence were taken by Ataturk. The first formal iteration of the square was established in 1931 with a major renovation and the addition of a municipal parking garage. The center of Samsun fell into a state of disrepair in the 1990s with suburbanization entailing many middle class residents moving out of the city center. The square however was revitalized with the opening of the Bulvar AVM in July 2012 which took the place of the abandoned though historic Samsun Tobacco Factory.

The square was declared as an urban transformation and development area on April 21, 2021. Plans call for a large historical restoration project and the connection of Republic Square to neighboring Anit Park. As part of the restoration project, the municipal parking garage and neighboring Site Mosque will be demolished.

== Location ==
The square is located in one of the busiest parts of the Ilkadim district, which is considered to be the center of Samsun. The Samsun Metropolitan Municipality Council, office buildings, a banks and the Bulvar AVM are located around it. The square is served by the Cumhuriyet Square stop of the Samsun Tram. The Samsun Gazi Museum is also located on the southern edge of the square.

Among many other daily activities, Blood donation can be done on the Kızılay bus, which is located permanently in the square. As a result of its central location, the square hosts events held on national and religious holidays.

== Gallery ==
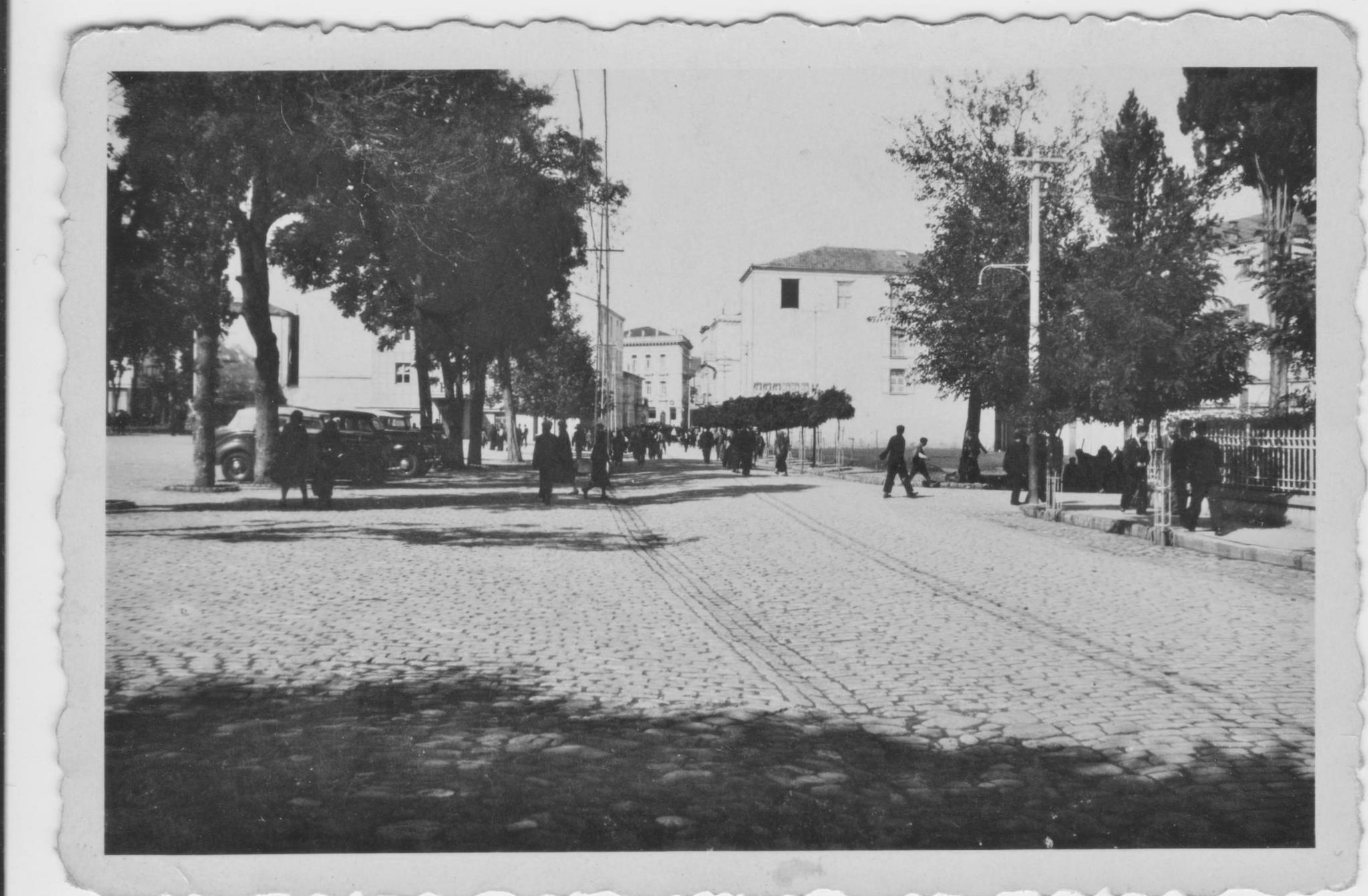
Rubpublic Square, 1931

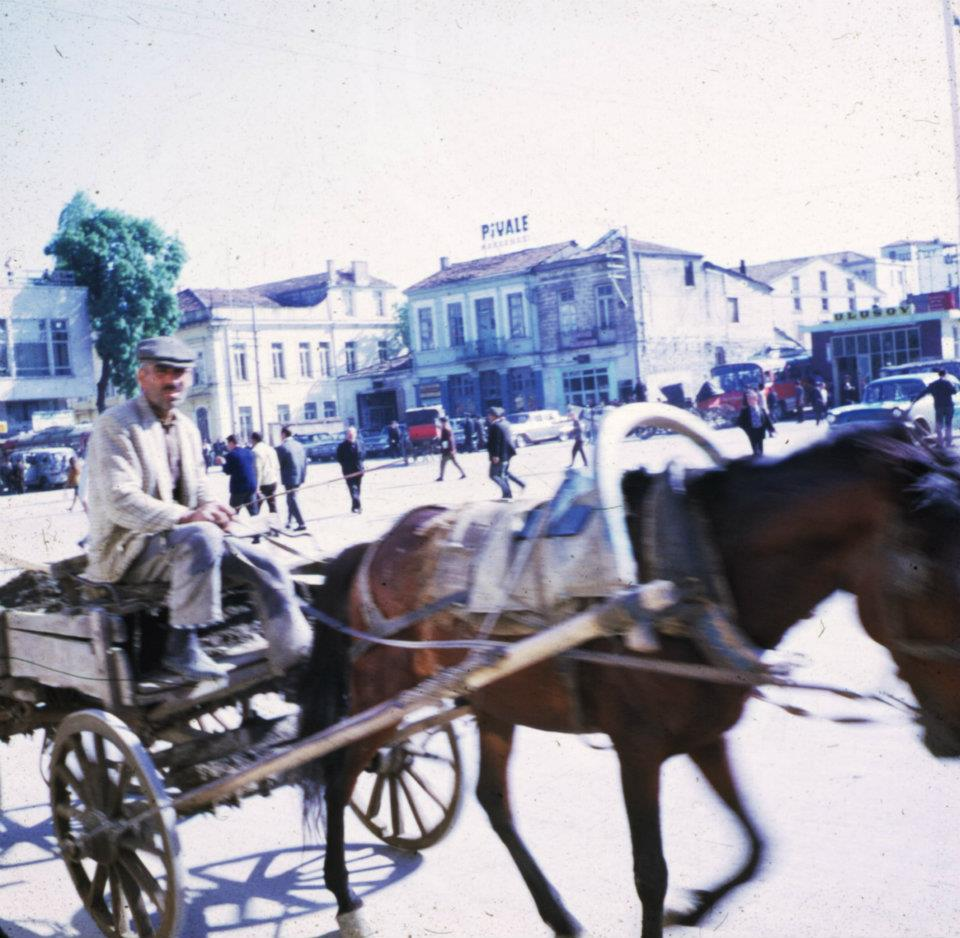
A horse carriage around Republic Square, c. 1968–1969.

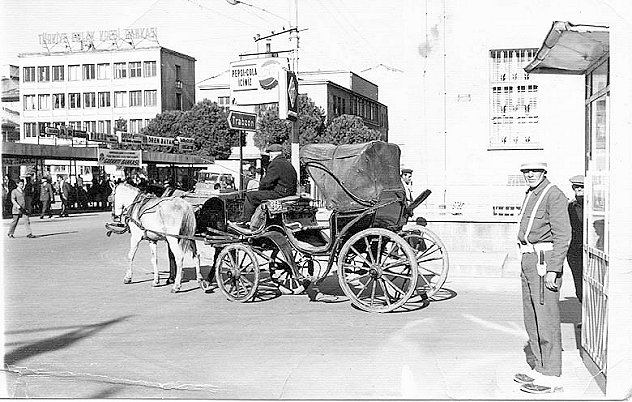
Republic Square photograph, 1973

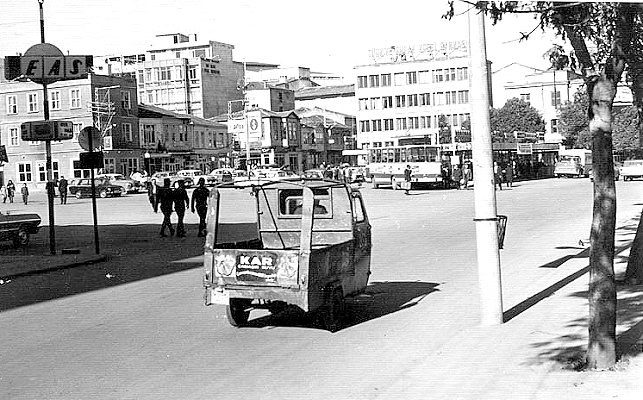
Republic Square, 1973
