= Samsun Clock Tower =

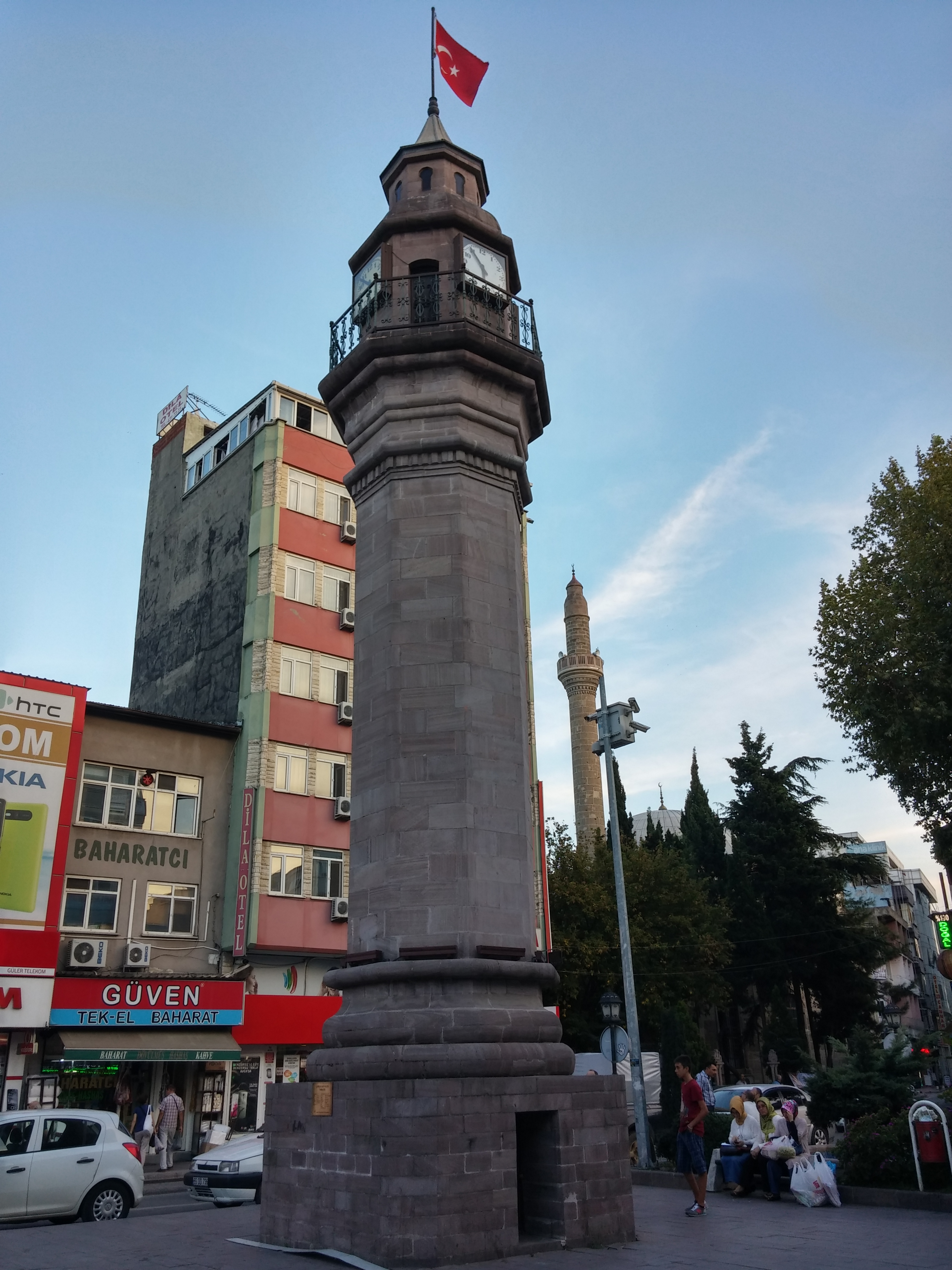
- Samsun's Historic Clock Tower
- Interactive map of the Samsun Clock Tower area

General information
- Type: Clock Tower
- Architectural style: Ottoman architecture
- Location: Samsun, Turkey
- Coordinates: 41.294724°N 36.332028°E
- Completed: 1886
- Renovated: 1977
- Demolished: 26 November 1948
- Client: Ottoman Empire

Height
- Height: 16.5 m (54 ft)

Dimensions
- Diameter: 2 m (6 ft 7 in)

Design and construction
- Architect: Kemal Taner

Samsun Clock Tower is the tower that gives its name to Samsun Saathane Square located in Ilkadim district of Samsun, Turkey.

== History ==
Abdul Hamid II sent an instruction to the governors of the Ottoman Empire in 1886 ordering the erection of clock towers in cities to commemorate the tenth anniversary of his accession to the throne. After the issuance of this order, construction began on the clock tower in the area known as "Iskele Square" in Trabzon Province. Constructed began in 1886 and was completed in 1887. An opening ceremony was held on Monday, May 9, 1887. Ünye stone was the primary material used in the construction of the clock tower. The tower was designed and constructed under the guidance of a Belgian-born French engineer. The tower was built with a polygonal base and body, constructed using an overlapping stonework system. Samsun, at the time of construction, was mostly a city of low-rise wooden homes. The tower was built above them to demonstrate grandeur and display time.

In 1933, the clock tower underwent its first and most significant renovation. The clock, which lagged behind the technology of the period, was removed and replaced with a new system clock powered by electricity. In addition, a siren system has been added to the tower to warn the public in case of fire.

After 1943 Ladik Earthquake, the clock tower was badly damaged and a commission was established to oversee the repair of the clock tower. In the report given by the commission to Samsun Governor Rüknettin Nasuhioğlu on 27 June 1944 by the commission, it was determined that there was no possibility of repairing the clock tower or preserving it as it was as a result of the damage from the earthquake. It was stated in the report that the structure would either collapse on its own or cause loss of life and property, so on 3 August 1948, the dismantling of the tower began. The clock of the tower was sold to the Municipality of Ladik for 550 liras in the same year so they could attach it to the Ladik Clock Tower.

A replacement clock tower was not built on Samsun Saathane Square until 1977. In 1977, a new clock tower was built as part of the clock tower project drawn by Architect Kemal Taner. The clocks on the new tower were brought from Switzerland and fitted to the structure.

On September 1, 2000, the reconstruction of the clock tower was started by the Samsun Metropolitan Municipality. This work was initiated because the clock tower erected in 1977 did not resemble the original 1887 structure. This historical restoration project took five months to complete. The opening of the third and newest clock tower, which was built faithfully to the original design was held on January 30, 2001. Ladik andesite stone was used as the material in the new tower, and the interlocking stone mesh system was used as the construction technique. The inner body was made of reinforced concrete and the foundation was laid with 4 15-meter bored piles. While the inner diameter of the new tower is 1.20 meters and the outer diameter is 2 meters, its height is 16.50 meters.

== Replica Towers ==
A model of the Samsun Clock Tower in the Time Witness Clock Towers Park in Safranbolu opened in 2012.

== Gallery ==
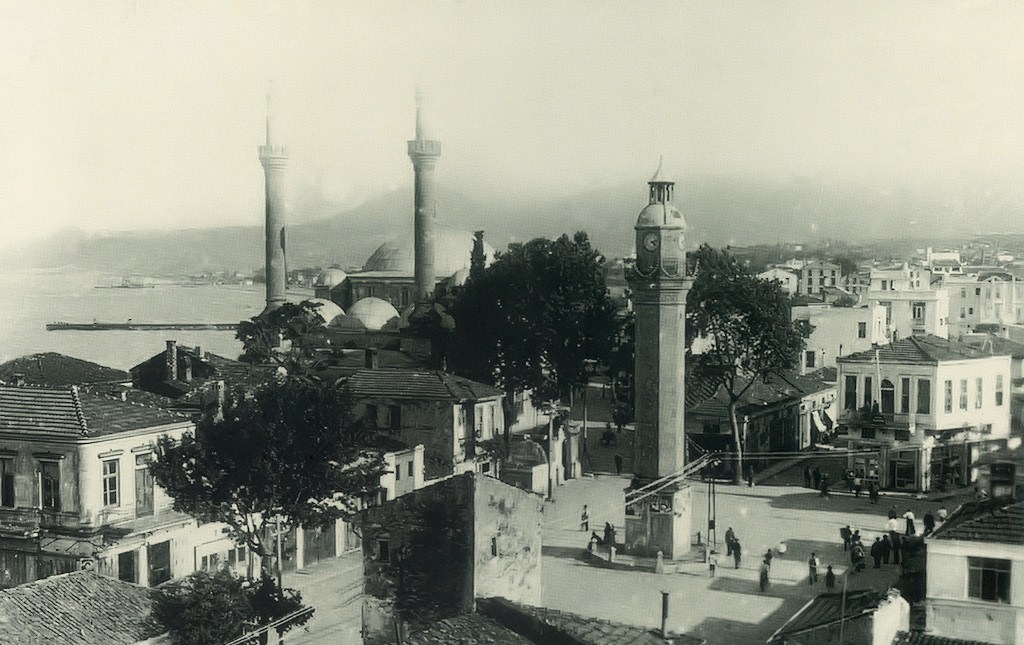
A photograph from the first years of the Republic. The clock tower is visible in the middle of Saathane Square.

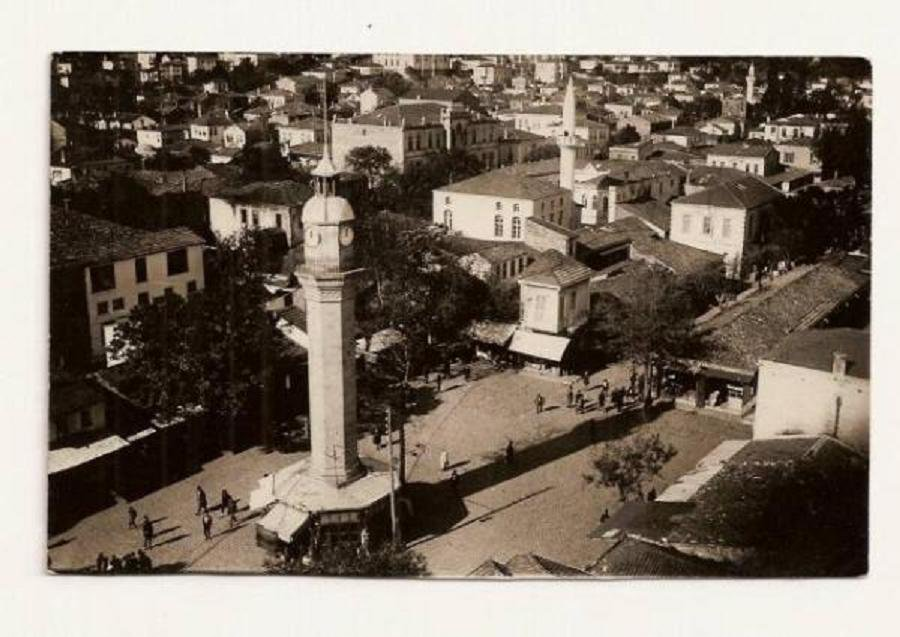
A view from the square in the 1920s. There are vendors at the base of the clock tower.

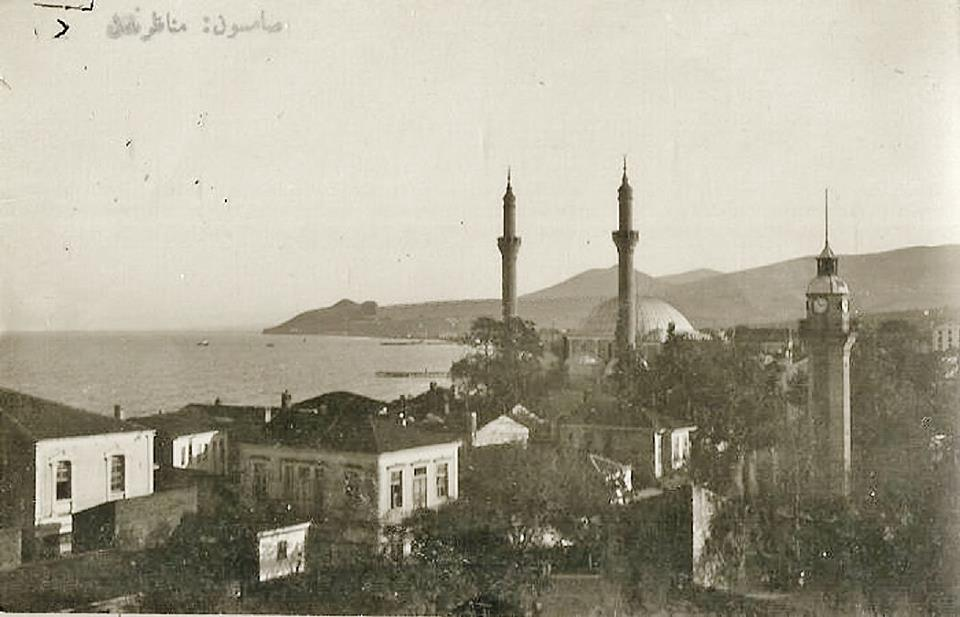
View of Samsun Clock Tower and Great Mosque.

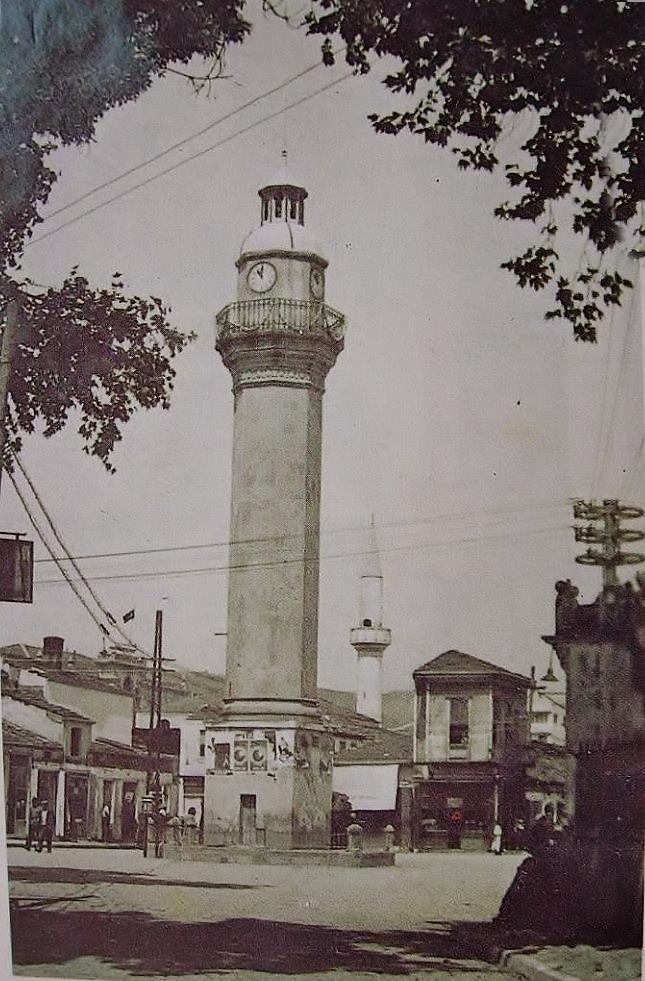
A photograph of the original clock tower from the 1930s.

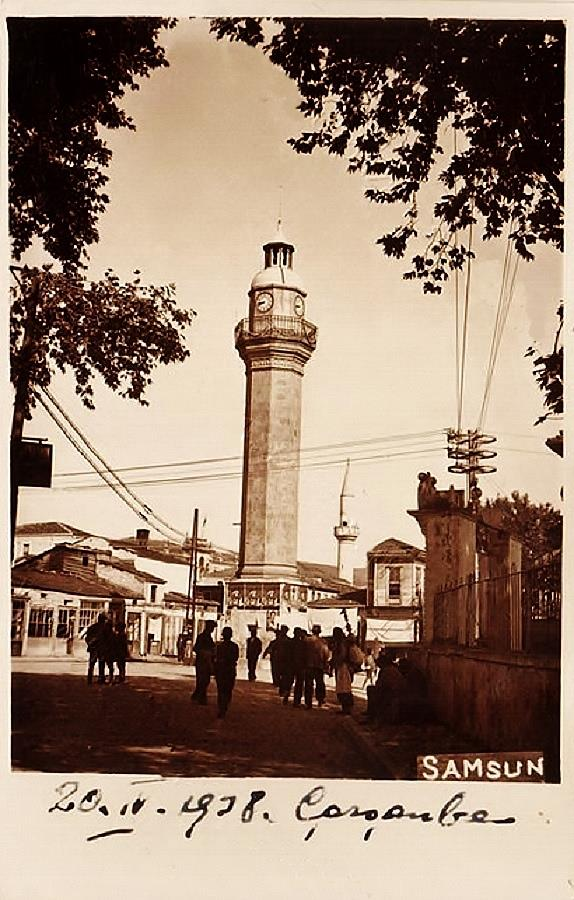
A 1938 photograph of the original clock tower.

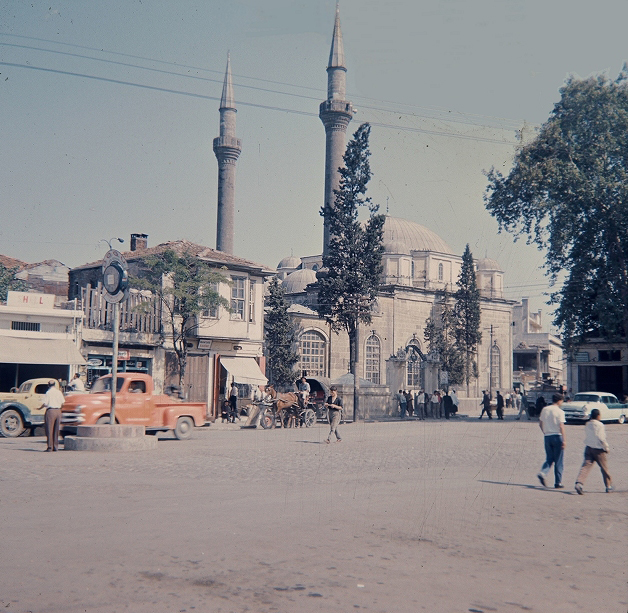
A photograph from the years when the earthquake-damaged clock tower was completely destroyed. There is a small clock pole at the point where the tower is located.

== See also ==
- Samsun Saathane Square
- Ladik Clock Tower
- Republic Square (Samsun)
