= Samsun Tram =

Tram network serving Samsun, Turkey

Samsun Tramway
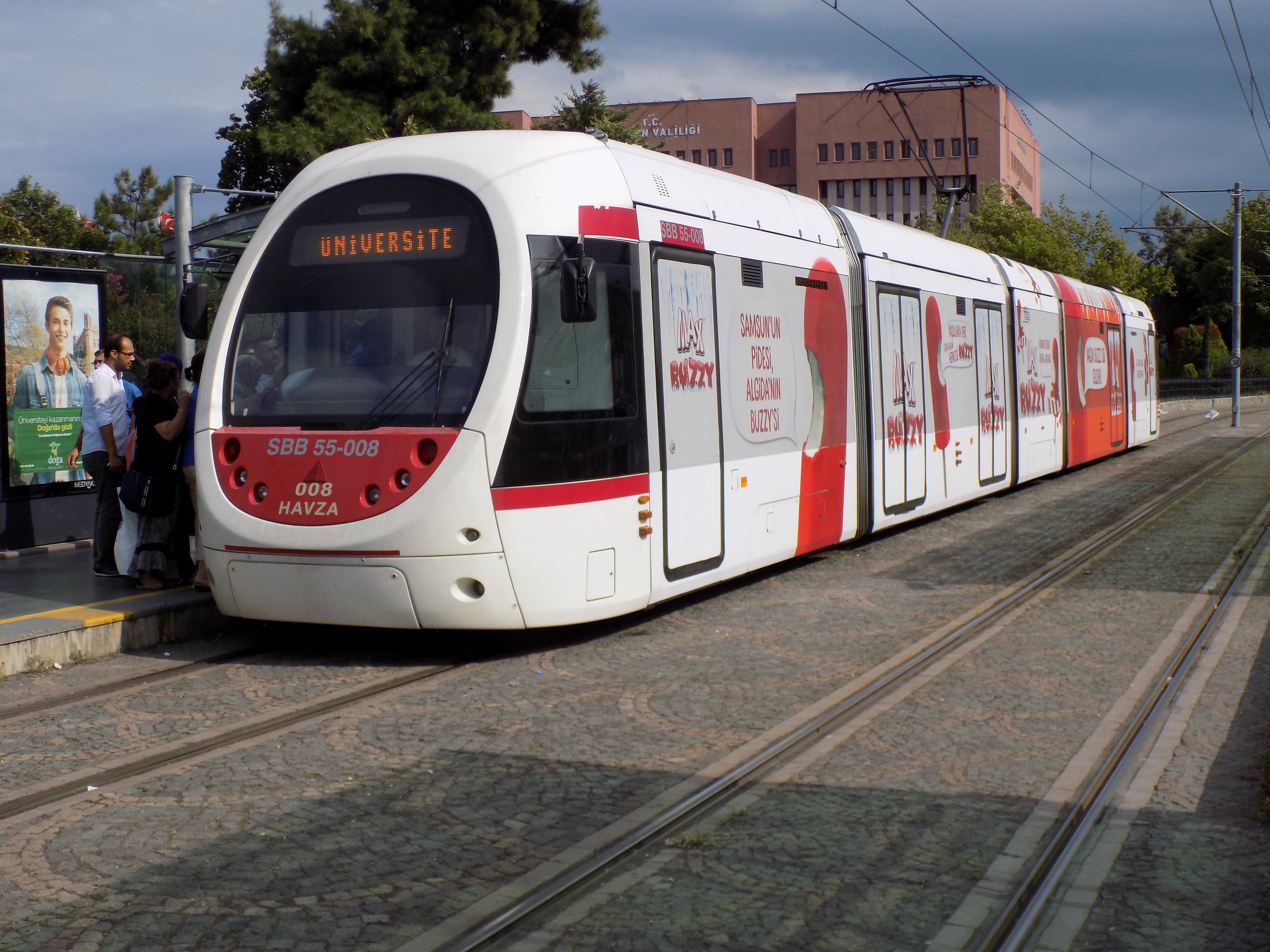

Overview
- Owner: Samsun Metropolitan Municipality
- Locale: Samsun
- Transit type: Light Rail
- Number of lines: 1
- Number of stations: 43
- Daily ridership: 90,000
- Chief executive: Enver Sedat Tamgacı
- Website: samulas.com.tr/hizmetler light-rail-system/

Operation
- Began operation: 2010
- Operator: Samulaş
- Number of vehicles: 29
- Train length: 32/40 m

Technical
- System length: 36.5
- Track gauge: 1435 mm
- Average speed: 62
- Top speed: 70

The Samsun Light Rail Transit System (Samsun Tramway) is a light rail transit system located in Samsun and Atakum, Turkey. The 36.5 km (22.7 mi) Samsun Tramway connects Ondokuz Mayıs University to Samsun Stadium. The system was constructed in three phases between 2010 and 2019. The tram line is the only urban rail system in the Black Sea Region pending the construction of the Trabzon Tram. The system carries 90,000 passengers daily and is one of the busiest tram systems in Turkey.

== History ==
In 2008, Samsun Province governor Yusuf Ziya Yılmaz announced the construction of a light rail transit line to be completed by 2010. The project was to include 21 stations and connect Samsun's central train station operated by Turkish State Railways with the rectorate of Ondokuz Mayıs University. This route was previously served by private and public bus and van operators but ridership figures were reviewed and led local and national officials to determine that construction of a light rail transit system connecting these destinations was warranted. The rapid growth of Atakum to the west of Samsun City Center further warranted investment in a transit system capable of moving a high numbers of riders. Construction of the first phase of the Samsun Tram began in 2008 and completed in 2010 to much fanfare.

As a result of heavy ridership and the political popularity of the first phase of the Samsun Tram, a second phase was announced in 2013. Phase two of the project entailed the construction of 15 additional stations between Samsun Central Train Station (Gar) and Samsun Stadium, home to the regional soccer club Samsunspor. The first part of the second phase opened on August 26, 2016, from Gar to Balıkçı Barınağı, and the second part from Balıkçı to Tekkeköy later opened on October 10, 2016. In addition to connecting Samsun Stadium to the City Center, the tram also connected the large industrial park and the suburbs of Tekkeköy, and left open the possibility of a future extension to Samsun-Çarşamba Airport.

Shortly after the completion of Phase II of the Samsun Tram, a third phase of the project was announced. The third phase is the only portion of the project that goes above ground. The tram primarily operates at grade with the exception of overpasses that were built a particularly busy road crossings in the first two phases. The third phase of the tramway was built on the Ondokuz Mayıs University campus and connects the Rectorate to the Residential Dormitories on the western edge of the campus. The third phase of the Samsun Tram was completed on July 5, 2019.

== Future Extensions ==
A future extension to Samsun-Çarşamba Airport is in the planning stages though make take the form of an electric bus depending on cost considerations.

== Track ==
Two types of rail are used on the length of the Tramway. The primary track gauge for the first phase of the project is S49 which comprises 13.49 km (8.38 mi) of the route while 2.2 km (1.37 mi) is of Rİ60 grooved rail. The tram primarily runs at-grade with the exception of two overpasses and one 420 m (1,377 ft 11 in) long underground condition at Ondokuz Mayıs University. There are 74 at-grade crossings which have been the source of frequent collisions with automobiles and pedestrians. The majority of at-grade crossings are in Atakum to the west of Samsun. Despite the tendency for collisions, the tram is widely regarded as a successful and efficient project that has reduced traffic congestion in the region.

== Stations ==
The project includes 43 stations. All stations offer safe and clearly identified at-grade pedestrian crossings. Five stations have pedestrian overpasses. Most stations are defined by simple at-grade platforms with fare collection machines and security staff. Shelters are provided at all stations in case of inclement weather. None of the system's stations are fully enclosed nor underground. All 43 stations are handicapped accessible. Fares are collected by turnstile ahead of boarding and stations are staffed with security guards to ensure fare payment. Fares are between 2.30 and 4.00 TL depending on the age of the rider.

The Samsun Tram connects several major destinations in the Samsun Region including: Samsun Stadium, Republic Square (Samsun), Piazza Samsun, Samsun Saathane Square, Samsun Clock Tower, Atakum and Ondokuz Mayıs University.

Number	Station	District
1	OMÜ Yurtlar	Atakum
2	Eğitim Fakültesi	Atakum
3	Yaşam Merkezi	Atakum
4	Sağlık Bilimleri	Atakum
5	Diş Hekimliği	Atakum
6	Tıp Fakültesi	Atakum
7	OMÜ Lojmanlar	Atakum
8	OMÜ Rektörlük / Batı Garajı	Atakum
9	Körfez	Atakum
10	Pelitköy	Atakum
11	Kurupelit	Atakum
12	Yeni Mahalle	Atakum
13	Atakent	Atakum
14	Çobanlı	Atakum
15	Ömürevleri	Atakum
16	Türk-İş	Atakum
17	Mimar Sinan Mahallesi	Atakum
18	Atakum Belediyesi	Atakum
19	Denizevleri / Esenevler	Atakum
20	Karayolları	Atakum
21	Güzel Sanatlar	İlkadım
22	Baruthane / Kalkancı	İlkadım
23	Fener	İlkadım
24	Gençlik Parkı	İlkadım
25	Liman	İlkadım
26	Büyük Cami	İlkadım
27	Cumhuriyet Meydanı	İlkadım
28	Gar	İlkadım
29	Kılıçdede	İlkadım
30	Samsunspor	Canik
31	Belediye Evleri	Canik
32	Mavi Işıklar	Canik
33	Balıkçı Barınağı	Tekkeköy
34	Asarağaç	Tekkeköy
35	Kirazlık	Tekkeköy
36	Örnek Sanayi	Tekkeköy
37	İlkadım Sanayi	Tekkeköy
38	19 Mayıs Sanayi	Tekkeköy
39	Organize Sanayi	Tekkeköy
40	Kerimbey	Tekkeköy
41	Cumhuriyet	Tekkeköy
42	Tekkeköy	Tekkeköy
43	Stadyum	Tekkeköy

== Rolling stock ==
The system is served by 16 AnsaldoBreda (now Hitachi Rail Italy) Sirio trams, each of which can carry 270 passengers.

In 2013-2014, five additional trams were supplied by CNR Tangshan. 8 Durmazlar Panorama trams were also delivered between 2016 and 2017.

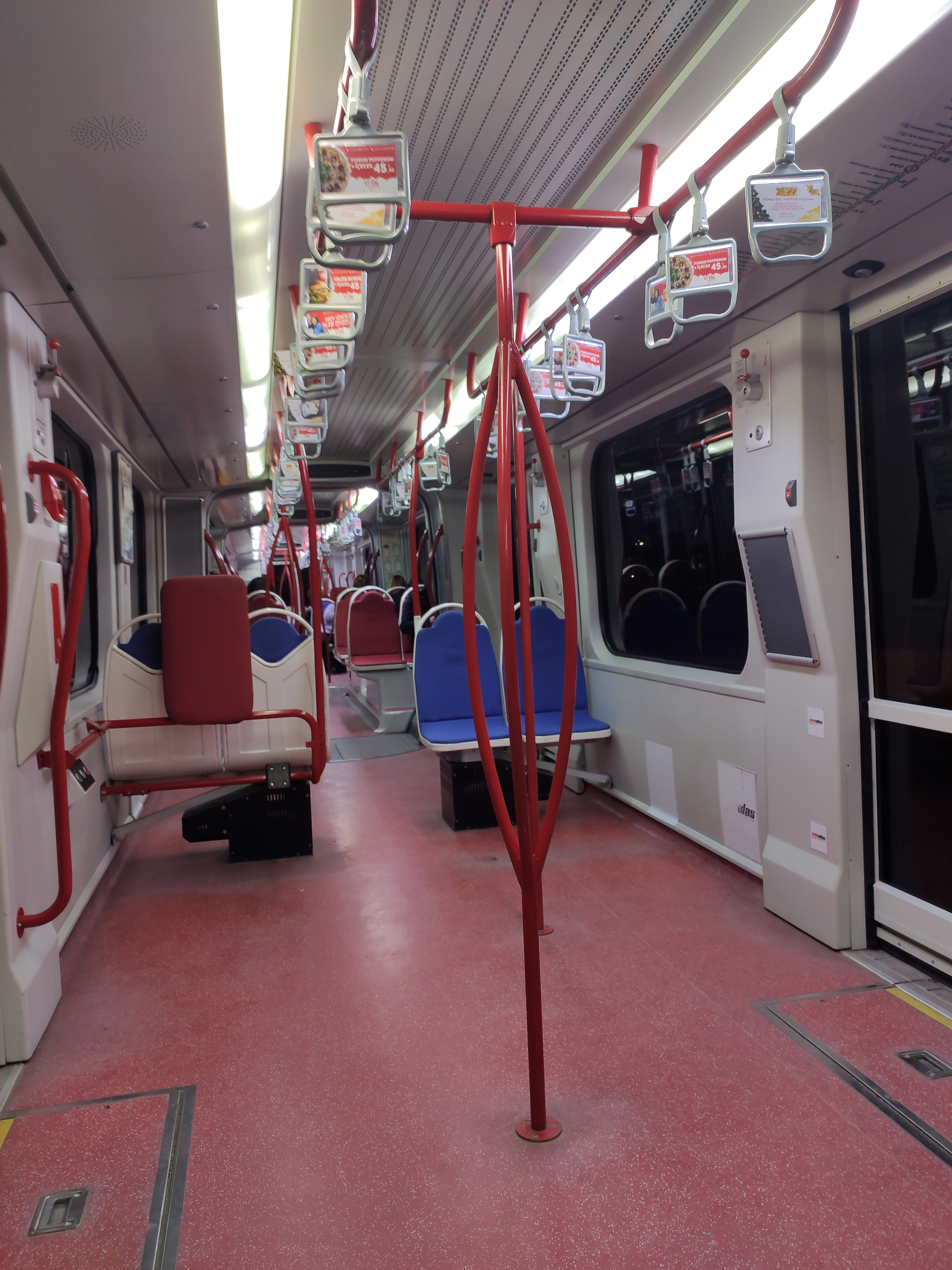
Tram interior

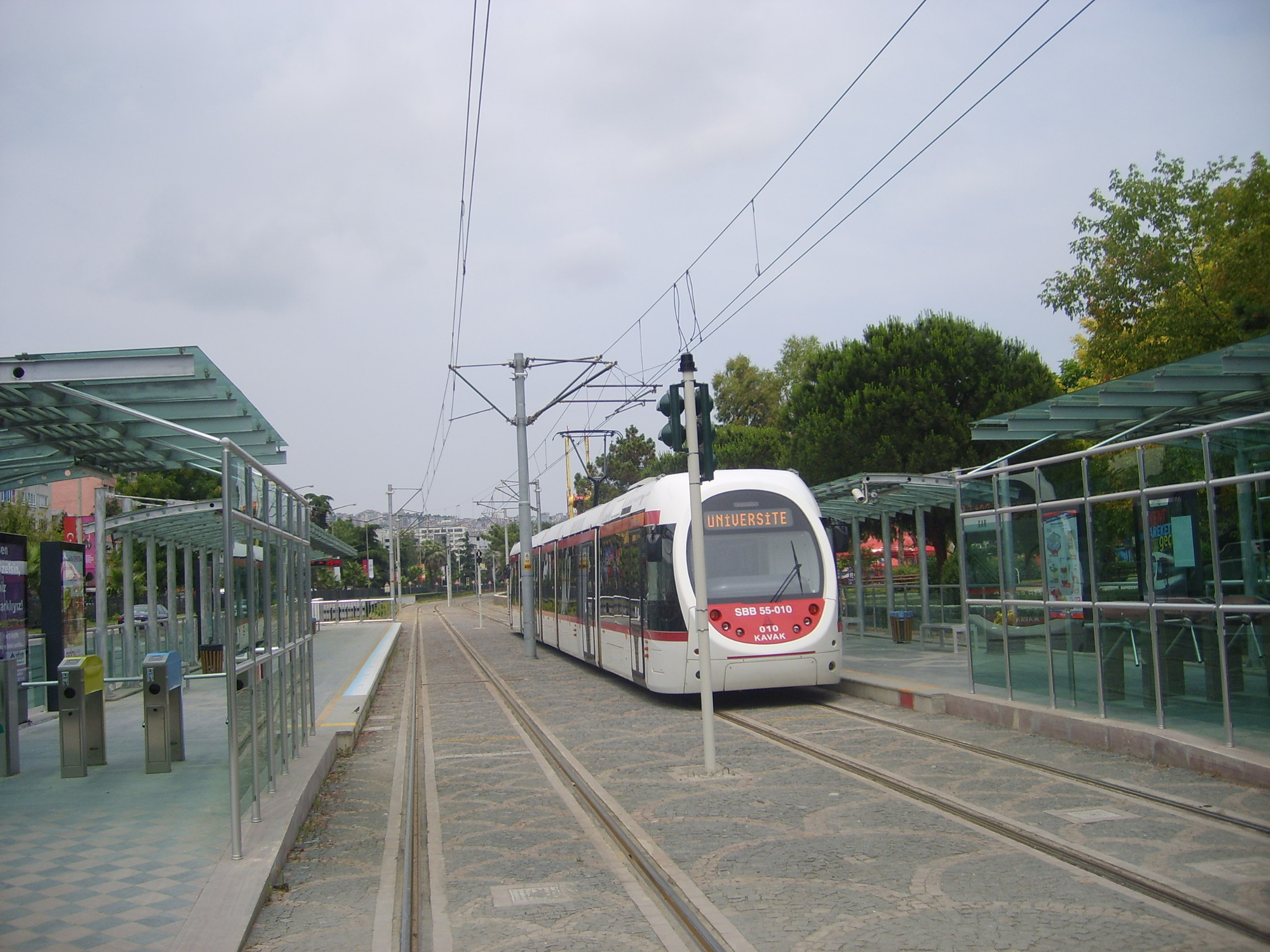
Gar Station

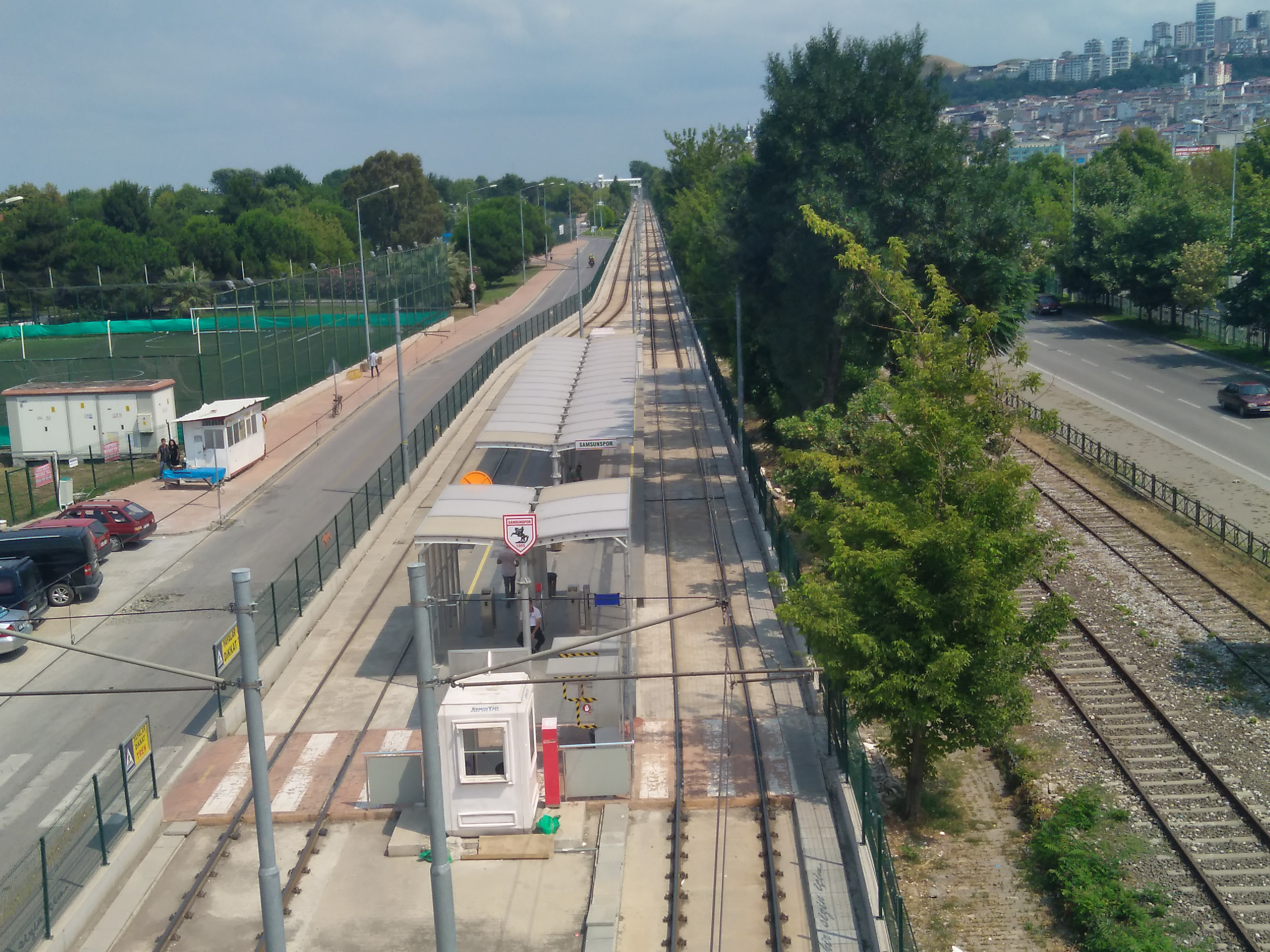
Samsun Stadium Station - a typical station condition

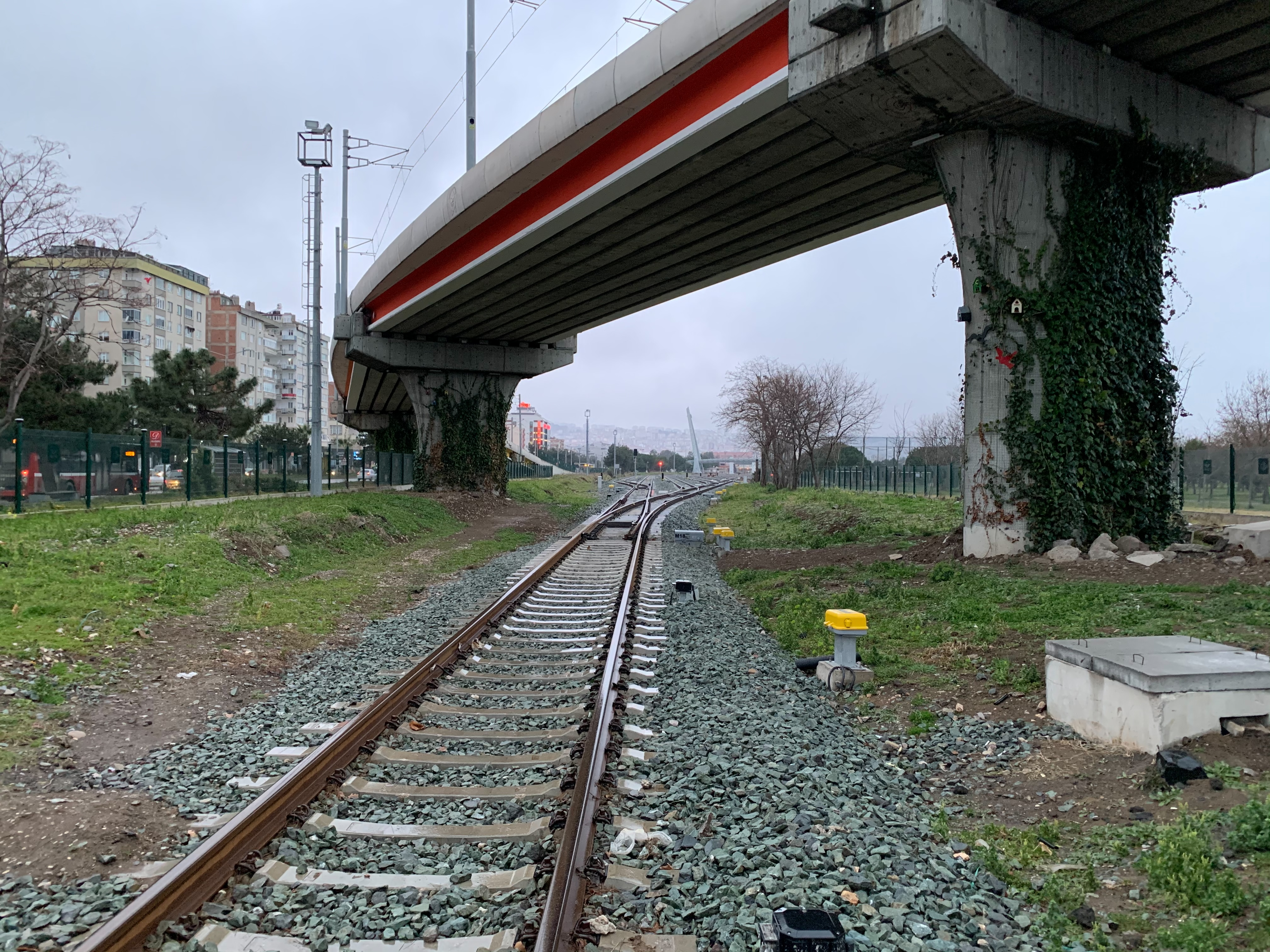
Samsun Tram Overpass
