= İlkadım =

- District and municipality
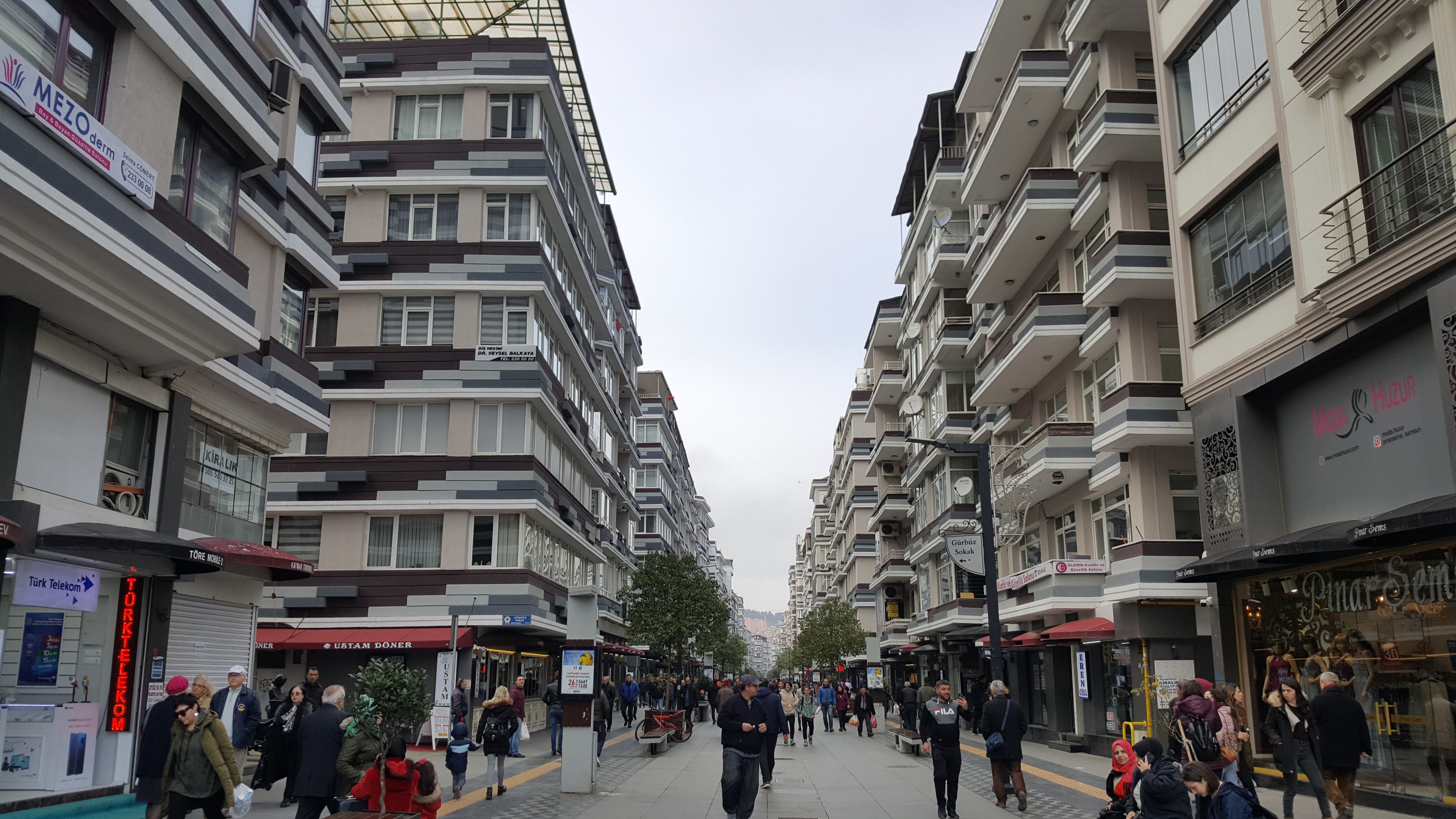
- İstiklal Street in İlkadım

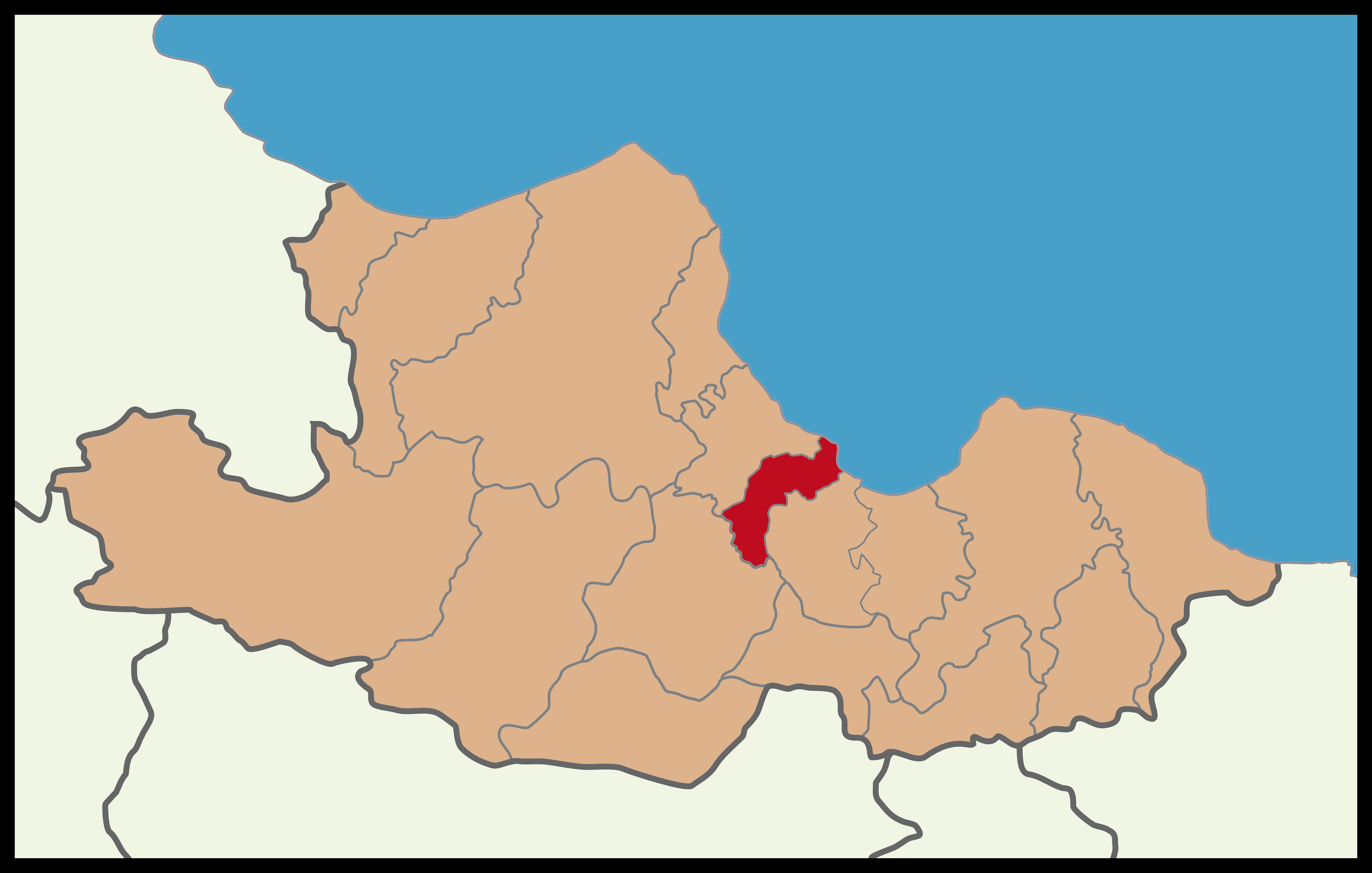
- Map showing İlkadım District in Samsun Province

- Location within Turkey
- Coordinates: 41°17′N 36°20′E
- Country: Turkey
- Province: Samsun

Government
  - Mayor: Ihsan Kurnaz (AKP)
- Area: 155 km^{2} (60 sq mi)
- Population (2022): 333,518
  - Density: 2,150/km^{2} (5,570/sq mi)
- Time zone: UTC+3 (TRT)
- Area code: 0362
- Climate: Cfa
- Website: www.ilkadim.bel.tr

İlkadım is a municipality and district of Samsun Province, Turkey. Its area is 155 km^{2} (60 sq mi), and its population is 333,518 (2022). It is located on the coast of Black Sea. The district has an altitude of 5 meters. It is also the most populous district of Black Sea Region. The majority of the urbanized portion of Samsun City is located within İlkadım.

İlkadım is bordered by Canik district to the east, the Black Sea in the north, Atakum district to the west, and Kavak district to the south.

== Geography ==
İlkadım is within the city of Samsun. The district includes the port of Samsun. The name İlkadım refers to Atatürk's arrival in Samsun via sea in the ship the Bandirma in order to start the Turkish War of Independence on 19 May 1919. (İlkadım means first step).

== History ==
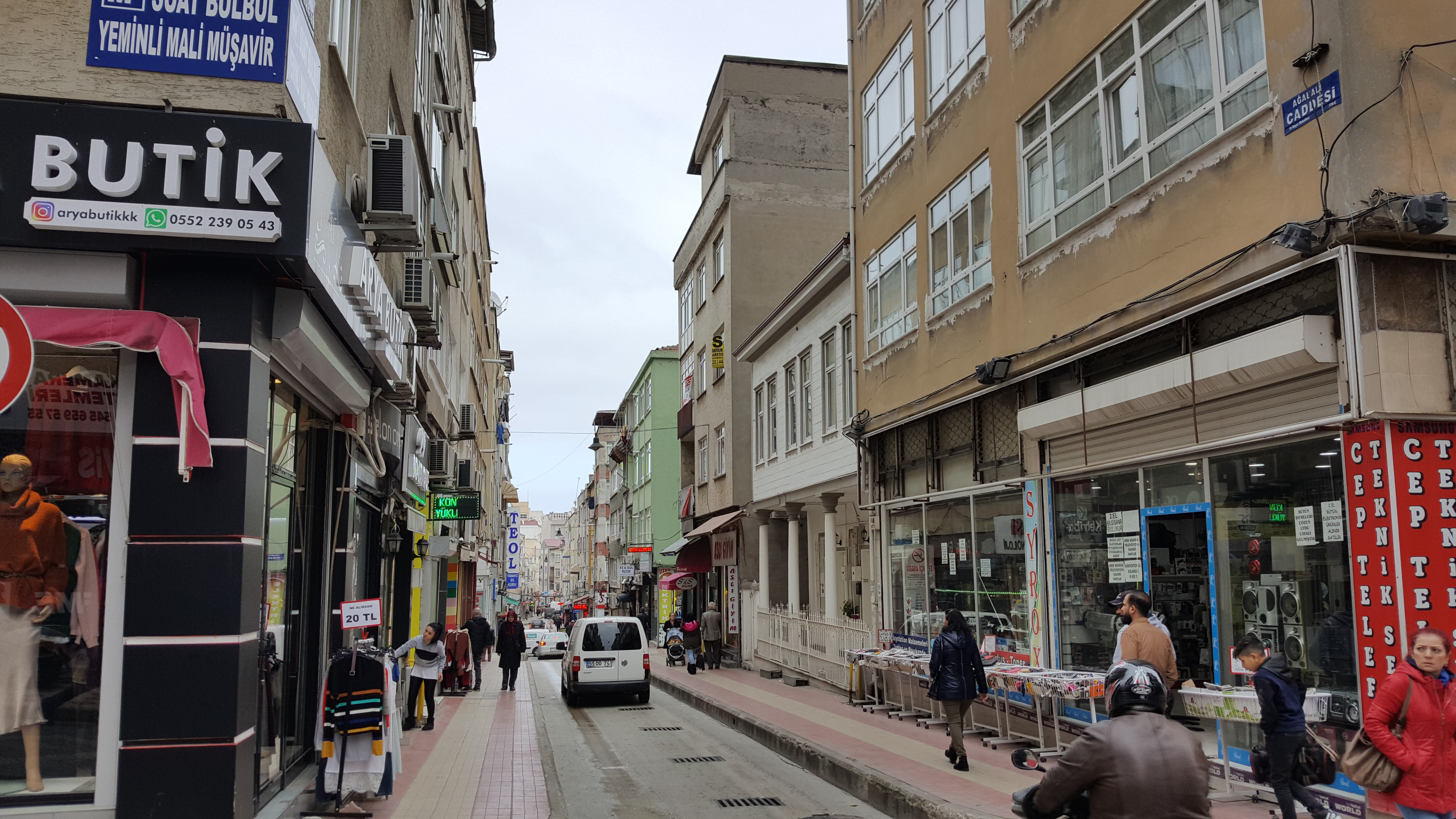
A typical street in urbanized İlkadım

Excavations have been carried out on the höyük of Dündartepe revealed a settlement of Chalcolithic age. During the early Hellenistic age there was a colony named Amisos (in Greek Αμισός) founded by the colonialists from Miletus. The colony was captured by Julius Caesar of Roman Empire in 43 BC. After 1071, the city was captured by Danishmends and Seljuks. In 1413 was incorporated into Ottoman Empire by Mehmet I.

İlkadım is a part of the Samsun Metropolitan Municipality. In 1994 it was declared a municipality within the city borders of the Samsun Metropolitan Municipality. With a law in 2008, it became one of the 4 central districts of Samsun by including the lower level municipalities of Gazi and Yeşilkent. At the 2013 Turkish local government reorganisation, the rural part of the district was integrated into the municipality, the villages becoming neighbourhoods.

Currently, it is the largest and most developed district of Samsun and the Black Sea Region in terms of population. With the growth of the region, commercial activities in the center have declined and much of the middle class of Samsun has moved to newer and more modern neighborhoods. Efforts have been made to revitalize İlkadım like the construction of the Sheraton Hotel Samsun, Piazza Samsun and the reconstruction of Samsun Saathane Square and Republic Square (Samsun). The district is also served by extensive public transit including the Samsun Tram.

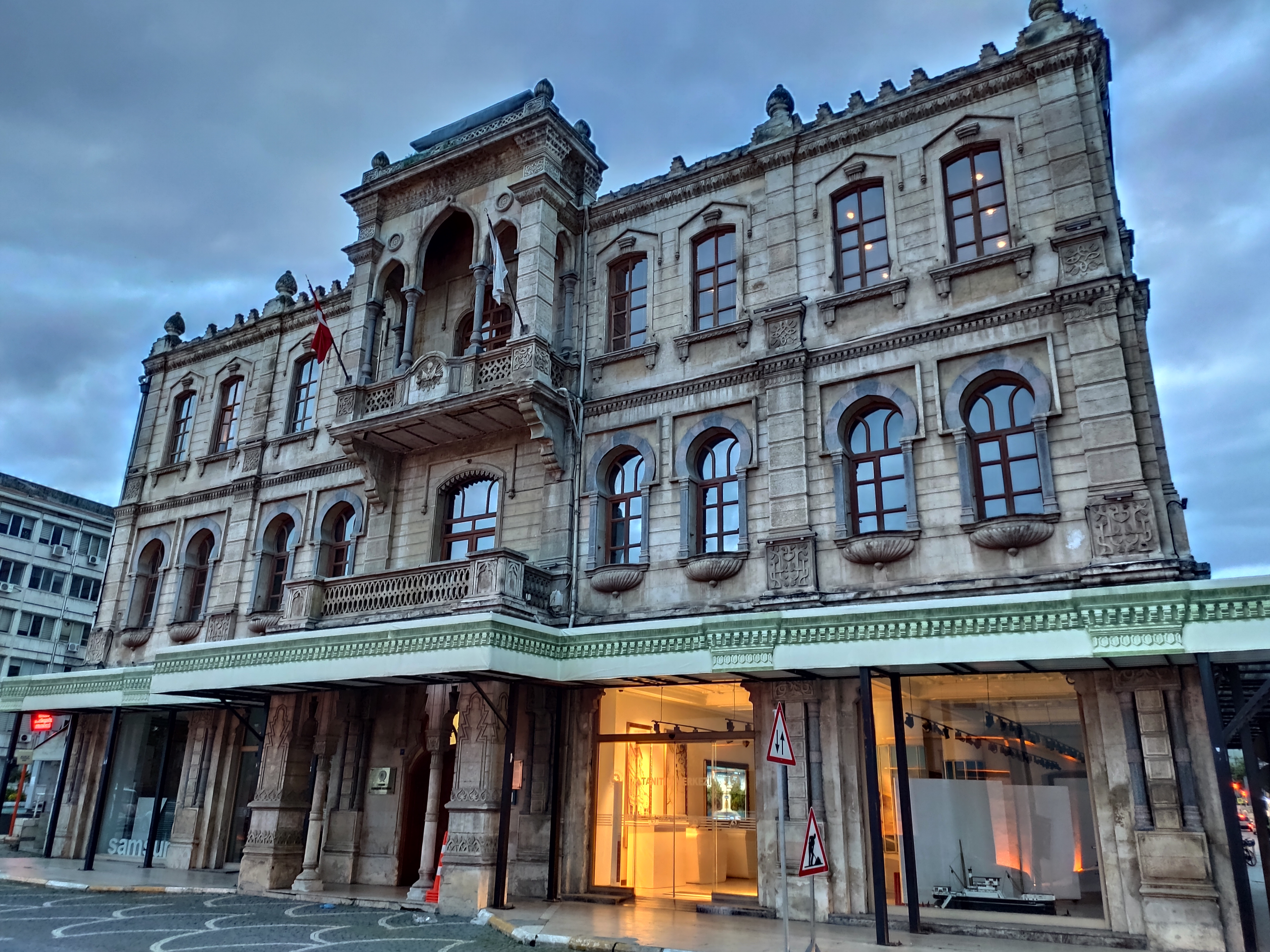
Historical Samsun Metropolitan Municipality Building

The district was named İlkadım because Atatürk came to Samsun and took the first step towards independence here on May 19, 1919.

== Population ==
In 2008, İlkadım had a population of 303,202, that figure grew to 333,518 by 2022. Despite continued population growth, the figure has been shadowed by the growth of neighboring districts like Atakum. The ten most populous neighborhoods in the district are respectively; Fevzi Çakmak, Kışla, Kazım Karabekir, Derebahçe, Adalet, Bahçelievler, Kadıköy, Karasamsun, Kadifekale and Ilyasköy. These ten neighborhoods with a total population of 144,387 (2022) make up 43% of the district's population. In 2022, İlkadım constituted 24% of the population of Samsun Province.

Historical population of Atakam district
Year	Pop.	±% p.a.
2008	303,202	—
2012	312,332	+0.74%
2017	333,218	+1.30%
2022	333,518	+0.02%
Source: TÜIK (2008-2022)

== Composition ==
There are 61 neighbourhoods in İlkadım District:

- 19 Mayıs
- Adalet
- Ahulu
- Akgöl
- Anadolu
- Aşağıavdan
- Ataköy
- Avdan
- Bahçelievler
- Baruthane
- Bilmece
- Çanakçı
- Çandır
- Çatalarmut
- Çay
- Cedit
- Çelikalan
- Çiftlik
- Çivril
- Derebahçe
- Derecik
- Fatih
- Fevziçakmak
- Gürgendağ
- Güzeldere
- Hançerli
- Hastane
- Hürriyet
- İlyasköy
- İstasyon
- Kadamut
- Kadifekale
- Kadıköy
- Kale
- Kalkanca
- Kapaklı
- Karadeniz
- Karasamsun
- Kavacık
- Kazımkarabekir
- Kılıçdede
- Kıran
- Kışla
- Kökçüoğlu
- Kuşçulu
- Liman
- Pazar
- Rasathane
- Reşadiye
- Saitbey
- Selahiye
- Tepecik
- Toybelen
- Ulugazi
- Unkapanı
- Uzgur
- Yaşardoğu
- Yenidoğan
- Yeşiltepe
- Zafer
- Zeytinlik

== Government and politics ==
The mayor is Necattin Demirtaş (Good Party). The Mayor of the Samsun Metropolitan Municipality is Mustafa Demir and the Governor of Samsun Province is Zülkif Dağlı. İlkadım is a traditionally politically conservative district.

== See also ==
- Surgical Instruments and Health Museum
- Statue of Honor, the landmark of Samsun
- Samsun Saathane Square, Samsun's Historic Square
- Samsun Clock Tower, Samsun's Clock Tower
- Piazza Samsun, the largest mall in the Central Black Sea Region
