= Turkish State Opera and Ballet =

Turkish cultural institution

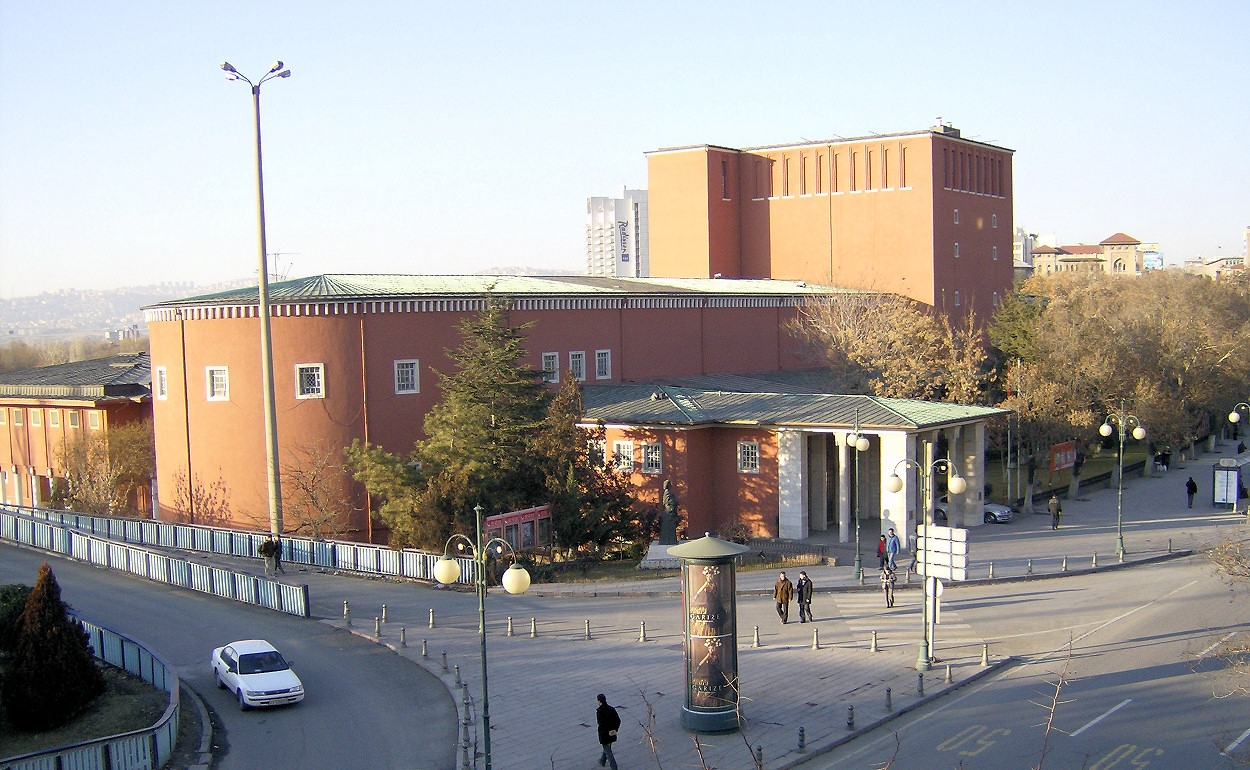
Ankara Opera House (Opera Sahnesi) is the first among three opera and ballet venues in Ankara.

The State Opera and Ballet (Turkish: Devlet Opera ve Balesi) is the national directorate of opera and ballet companies of Turkey, with venues in Ankara, Istanbul, İzmir, Mersin, Antalya and Samsun. The directorate is bound to the Ministry of Culture and Tourism. As of January 2018, Murat Karahan is the General Director.

== History ==
=== Early history ===
The first opera staged during the Ottoman period is usually attributed to the reign of Selim III (1761–1808), when Selim, himself a composer and a poet, invited a foreign company to stage an opera at the Topkapı Palace in 1797.

In 1840, Gaetano Donizetti's Belisario became the first opera to be translated into Turkish, and was performed at the newly built theatre by Italian architect Bartolomeo Bosco. The theater was transferred to Tütüncüoğlu Michael Naum Efendi in 1844, who continued to arrange opera performances for the following 26 years. An important public opera performance was Giuseppe Verdi's Ernani, staged by an Italian company in Beyoğlu in 1846. Also in 1846, Naum Efendi's theatre was destroyed by fire and was replaced by a new one. During the period of 1846–1877, operas of Verdi, performed mostly by Italian companies, reached a wide audience. One of the earliest Turkish operettas was Leblebici Horhor (Horhor the chickpea seller), by the Armenian composer Dikran Çuhacıyan who is also remembered as the composer of what may have been the first original opera in Turkish, Arif'in Hilesi (Arif's Deception) 1874.

As with other arts, the development of Turkish opera and ballet was brought to a halt from the 1880s by almost constant warfare, peaking in the Balkan Wars and World War I which resulted in the collapse of the empire.

=== Republican period ===
The foundation of the new Republic of Turkey in 1923 was followed by Atatürk's Reforms, of which far-reaching cultural reforms were an important step. Under Atatürk's personal guidance, many talented young people were sent to Europe for professional training, who, upon their return during the 1930s, became teachers of music and performing arts at the newly established Musiki Muallim Mektebi in Ankara (opened in 1924) and Darülelhan in Istanbul.

The first Turkish opera, Özsoy, composed by Ahmet Adnan Saygun to a libretto by Münir Hayri Egeli, premiered in 1934, singers included Semiha Berksoy. It was shortly followed by Adnan Saygun's Taşbebek and Necil Kazım Akses's Bay Önder.

During 1935, German composer Paul Hindemith and theatre director Carl Ebert were invited to give lectures at Musiki Muallim Mektebi in Ankara, which was subsequently transformed into Ankara State Conservatory. The two lecturers were offered permanent posts at the conservatory, an offer which Paul Hindemith was not able to accept. Nevertheless, he kept visiting Ankara and inspecting the activities at the music school. Carl Ebert stayed in Ankara as the director of the conservatory theatre school and opera studio for the following nine years.

On May 16, 1940, the State Conservatory was firmly established under law, comprising music, opera, ballet, and theatre schools. The first performance staged by the students of the conservatory was Mozart's one-act comic opera Bastien und Bastienne, performed with Turkish text in the accompaniment of the Turkish Presidential Symphony Orchestra. In 1940, the second act of Puccini's Madama Butterfly was performed in Turkish by the staff of the conservatory opera studio, followed in 1941 by Tosca.

The conversion of the existing Sergievi (Exhibition House) building in Ankara into an opera house was started in 1947 and the building started serving as the Ankara Opera House on April 2, 1948, with the performance of pieces composed by the Turkish Five and the premiere of Ahmet Adnan Saygun's Kerem. The organization of the opera orchestra and chorus was completed between 1950 and 1953. During the same period, a ballet school was established in Istanbul with prima ballerina Ninette de Valois, who appointed Molly Lake and Travis Kemp to run it. The school was later integrated into Ankara State Conservatory, giving its first graduates in 1956.

Management of the theatre and the opera were separated in 1958, creating the directorates of Turkish State Theatres and State Opera and Ballet. In 1959, the Istanbul City Opera was established by the private effort of Aydın Gün, and it was nationalized in 1970 as the Istanbul State Opera and Ballet.

This was followed by the establishment of İzmir State Opera and Ballet in 1983, Mersin State Opera and Ballet in 1992, Antalya State Opera and Ballet in 1999 and Samsun State Opera and Ballet in 2009.

== Venues ==
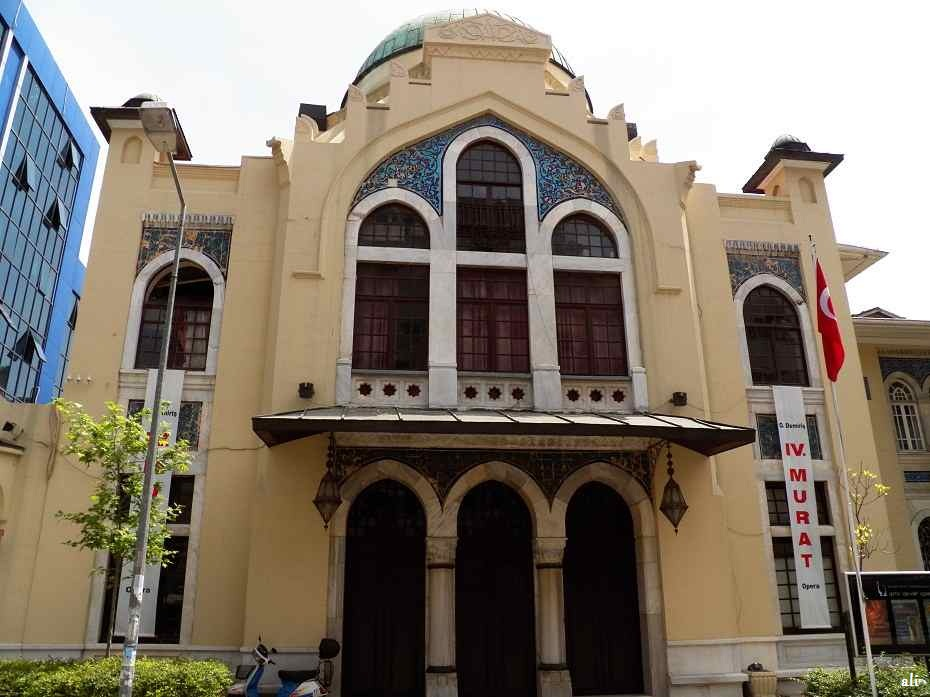
Facade of the İzmir State Opera and Ballet

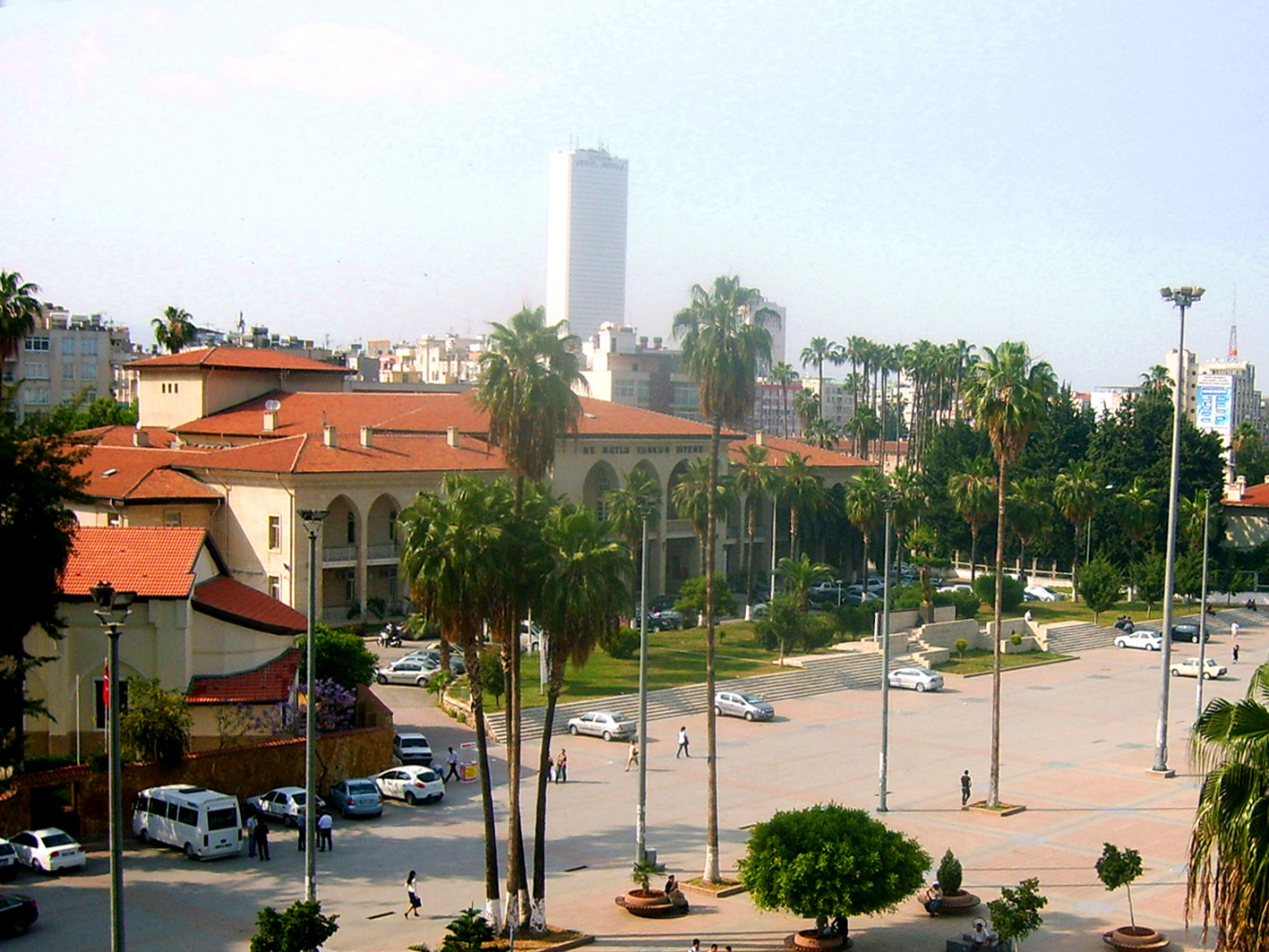
Mersin Halkevi, the Mersin venue

=== Ankara ===
- Ankara Opera House (Opera Sahnesi / Büyük Tiyatro)
- Leyla Gencer Sahnesi
- Operet Sahnesi

=== Istanbul ===
- Atatürk Cultural Center
- Süreyya Opera House

=== İzmir ===
- İzmir State Opera and Ballet

=== Mersin ===
- Mersin State Opera and Ballet

=== Antalya ===
- Antalya State Opera and Ballet

=== Samsun ===
- Samsun State Opera and Ballet

== Aspendos International Opera and Ballet Festival ==
The State Opera and Ballet directorate organizes, since 1994, the annual opera and ballet festival in the ancient theatre of Aspendos, near Antalya, with international participation of opera and ballet companies.

== See also ==
- Turkish State Theatres
- Ballet in Turkey
- Music of Turkey
