= Özgüç =

Özgüç is a Turkish surname and male given name formed by the combination of the Turkish words öz ("gist; kernel") and güç ("power", "strength", "force") and may refer to:

== Surname ==
- Agah Özgüç (1932–2022), Turkish journalist
- Naci Özgüç (born 1964), Turkish conductor
- Nimet Özgüç (1916–2015), Turkish archaeologist
- Tahsin Özgüç (1916–2005), Turkish archaeologist

== Given name ==
- Özgüç Türkalp (born 1974), Turkish football referee
