= Naci Özgüç =

Turkish conductor (born 1964)

Naci Özgüç (born 1964 in Ankara) is a Turkish conductor. He is chief conductor of the Ankara State Opera and Ballet Orchestra of the Turkish State Opera and Ballet. His mother is the soprano and voice instructor at the State Conservatory Müfide Özgüç.

He premiered Fazıl Say's Nazım and Turgay Erdener's operettas İstanbulname and Mi'den Dört Bölüm. His discography includes a recording of Ahmet Adnan Saygun's Yunus Emre Oratorio with Youth Choir Osnabrück and the Symphony Orchestra Osnabrück for the Dreyer Gaido label in 2011.
