= Mahir Canova Stage =

Mahir Canova Stage (Turkish: Mahir Canova Sahnesi) is a theatre in Balgat neighborhood of Çankaya district in Ankara, Turkey. It is operated by the Turkish State Theatres. It is named in honor of theatre director Mahir Canova (1915–1993).
