= Ballet in Turkey =

Turkish Prima Ballerina Gulcan Tunccekic in Sleeping Beauty in 1961.

The history of the art of classical ballet in Turkey only goes back about 60 years, however, classical ballet performances in Turkey date from two centuries before. The General Superintendent of the Ottoman Military Bands, Donizetti Pasha, was invited to Istanbul in September 1828 and introduced the principles of classical western music as well as some samples of operas and ballets to the Ottoman Palace of Mahmud II.

== History ==
Turkish ballet, in the period prior to the proclamation of the Republic of Turkey, was mostly centered around Istanbul and İzmir. Turkish ballet has been intimately connected to Turkish opera, as the scenes between operas were frequently lavished with ballet performances and dances.

There is no tradition of classical ballet in Turkey, and very little knowledge about it relied heavily on foreign intervention. Lydia Krassa Azrumanova, a ballet teacher who immigrated to Turkey after the 1917 revolution in Russia, opened a ballet studio in Istanbul in 1921. In 1948, Dame Ninette de Valois, a famous ballerina and ballet teacher, founder of the British Royal Ballet, was invited to Istanbul and the National Ballet School was established in Yeşilköy through her intermediary, modeled according to that of the Sadler's Wells Ballet in London. Later, it was integrated into the Ankara State Conservatory, giving its first graduates in 1956. Eventually, ballet and opera were separated in 1958, creating Turkish State Theatres and Turkish State Opera and Ballet.

In 1965, the ballet season featured a ballet titled Çeşmebaşı, referring to the fountain found in the centre of the village square of every Turkish village. It was the first attempt to create a ballet with music composed by a Turkish musician, which had elements of Turkish folk dance music. It was truly the first Turkish ballet. The State Ballet company is celebrating its 50th anniversary in 2017. Until the year 2010, the State Ballet had staged almost all of the great creations of the classical ballet repertoire.
