= Altındağ Theatre =

Theatre in Ankara, Turkey

Coordinates: 39.95252°N 32.87313°E

Altındağ Theatre (Turkish: Altındağ Tiyatrosu) is a theatre in Altındağ district of Ankara, Turkey. It is operated by the Turkish State Theatres.
