= İrfan Şahinbaş Workshop Stage =

Theater in Yenimahalle, Turkey

İrfan Şahinbaş Workshop Stage (Turkish: İrfan Şahinbaş Atölye Sahnesi) is a theatre in Yenimahalle district of Ankara, Turkey. It is operated by the Turkish State Theatres. The theatre is named in honor of İrfan Şahinbaş (1912–1990), an academic in English studies and History of theatre.
