= Şevki Balmumcu =

Turkish architect

Şevki Balmumcu (1905 – 20 April 1982) was a Turkish architect who designed the Ankara Opera House.

In 1928, he graduated from the Academy of Fine Arts as an architect. Between 1930 and 1932, he worked as the control architect of many buildings including Bursa Cinema Theater in Bursa, which is among the first modern cinema, theater and concert halls of the republic history.

The winning of a cinema and office building project competition in Elâzığ is one of the important achievements in his professional life. However, the most important turning point in his career was that he won the competition for the Ankara exhibition building in 1933. The building, which was built in 1933–1934, was a successful practice in Soviet Structuralism or Neo-Plasticism styles. The building, which often hosts exhibitions reflecting the development moves of the republic, was used as a work symbolizing the ideals of Kemalist thought in photographs, postcards and republic posters, and most often in the pages of La Turquie Kemaliste.

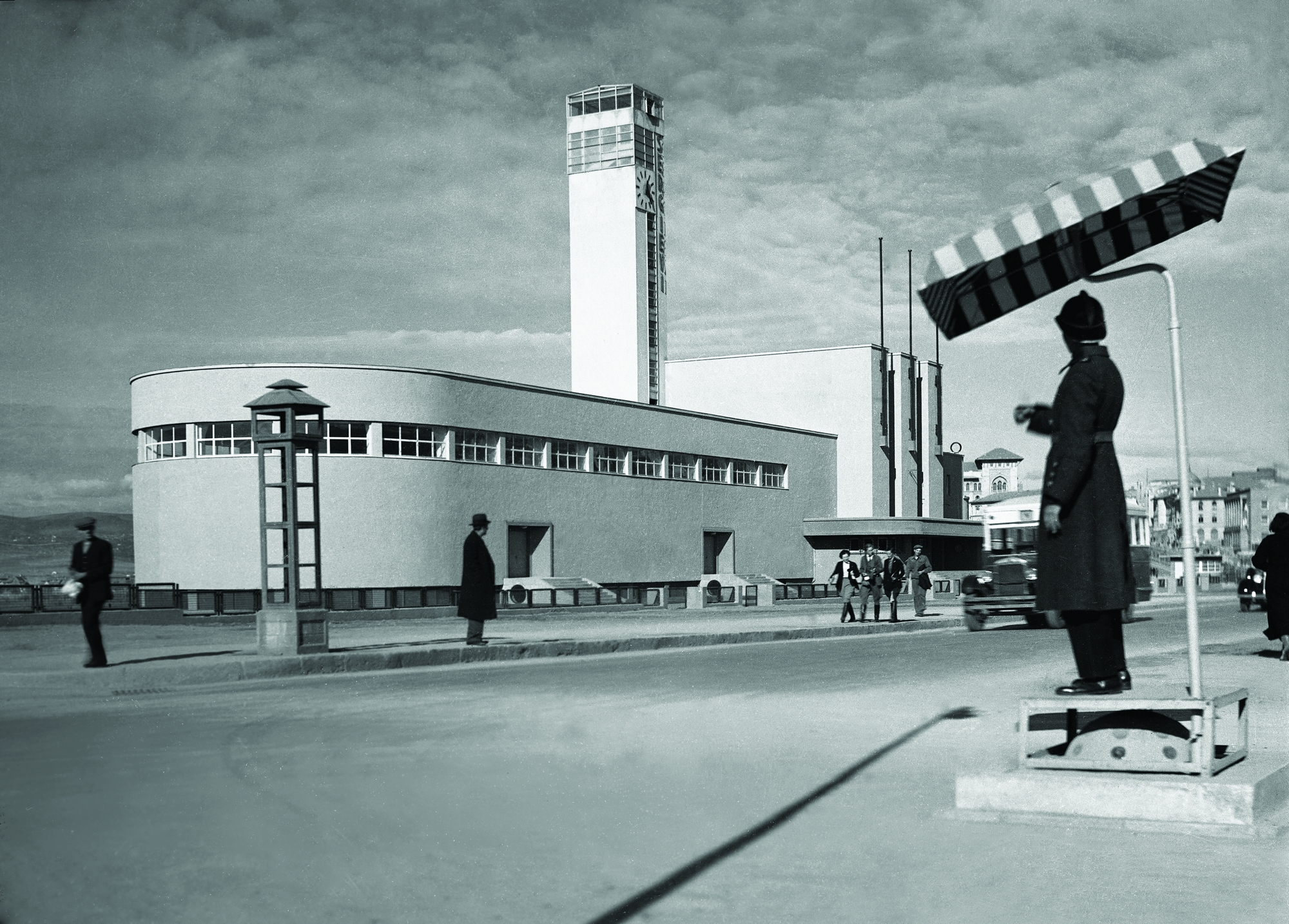
The Exhibition House, later Ankara Opera House

The exhibition building was converted into an opera house in 1948 by Paul Bonatz. It is said that the transformation of the structure from its original form into an appropriate form for the style of Second National Architecture with its porticoes and ornaments distressed Şevki Balmumcu and removed him from the architectural profession. The architect did not go to Ankara after this incident.

After his success in 1933, Şevki Balmumcu won many architectural design competitions. From 1941 to 1958 he worked in Tekel General Directorate as a construction bureau chief. After 1958, he continued his professional life independently, but there was no remarkable work during this period. He died on April 20, 1982. He was buried in Edirnekapı Cemetery.
