= İrfan Şahinbaş =

Turkish academician, translator and scientist

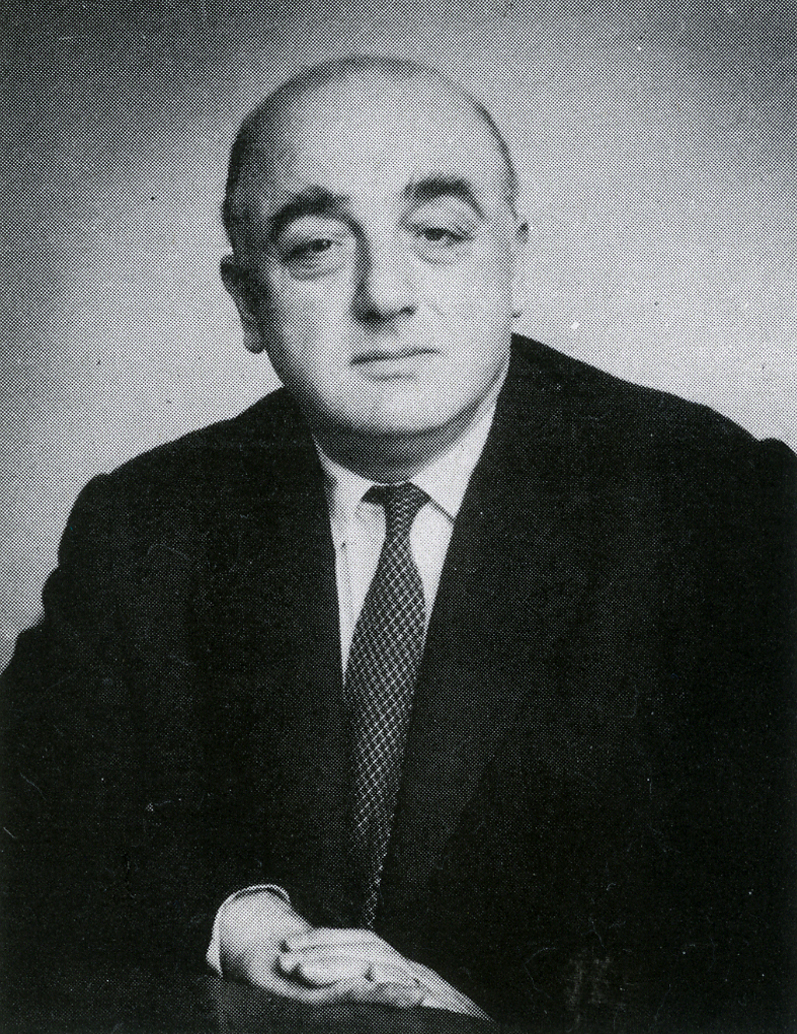
- Born: November 23, 1912; Istanbul
- Died: April 2, 1990 (aged 77)
- Education: Cambridge University
- Occupations: Academician, translator

İrfan Şahinbaş (November 23, 1912, İstanbul – April 2, 1990, Ankara), was a Turkish academician, translator, athlete and a prominent figure in Turkey's intellectual life during the early Republican period. He taught English literature at Ankara University for over 44 years. A generation of Turkish ministers, ambassadors, governors, teachers and professors were his students.

== Biography ==
İrfan Şahinbaş graduated from the French Lycée Saint-Joseph in Istanbul, later to be sent to Cambridge University by Atatürk to study English literature (1934–1937). At Fitzwilliam House, he was invited to join the athletics team. Earning his full blue, he dominated the shot put competitions of his day, winning for a record four times. During the games at White City in 1937, he caused a sensation when he broke the British and Turkish national and British University shot putting records. His university record remained unbroken for over 20 years.

On his return home, he joined the Faculty of Letters at the Ankara University, being appointed a professor in 1950.

Between 1952 and 1953, he did research into American literature and drama at Harvard and Pennsylvania University, establishing an American literature sub-division on his return to Ankara University.

In 1958, he founded the first institute of theater studies in Turkey, making theater studies a distinct science. He vice-chaired this institution with Prof. Dr. Bedrettin Tuncel becoming the department chair. He later chaired the play-selecting committee of the Turkish State Theater. To honor his efforts, a theater in Ankara, the İrfan Şahinbaş Workshop Stage is named after him.

İrfan Şahinbaş was a pioneer of British-Turkish relations. He founded the Turco-British Association, serving as its chairman for 25 years. For his services to Anglo-Turkish relations, he was appointed an honorary OBE.

He also served as a member and chairman of the Fulbright Commission for Turkey for over 32 years. He sat on the council of the International Theatre Institute and represented Turkey at UNESCO.

Due to his background and success in athletics, he served as the head of the Turkish Athletics Federation between 1942 and 1946.

Şahinbaş's translations into Turkish includes the works of Shakespeare, Sean O'Casey, Marlowe, Seift and J. B. Priestley.

He retired from Ankara University in 1983. He died on April 3, 1990, in Ankara.

== Gallery ==
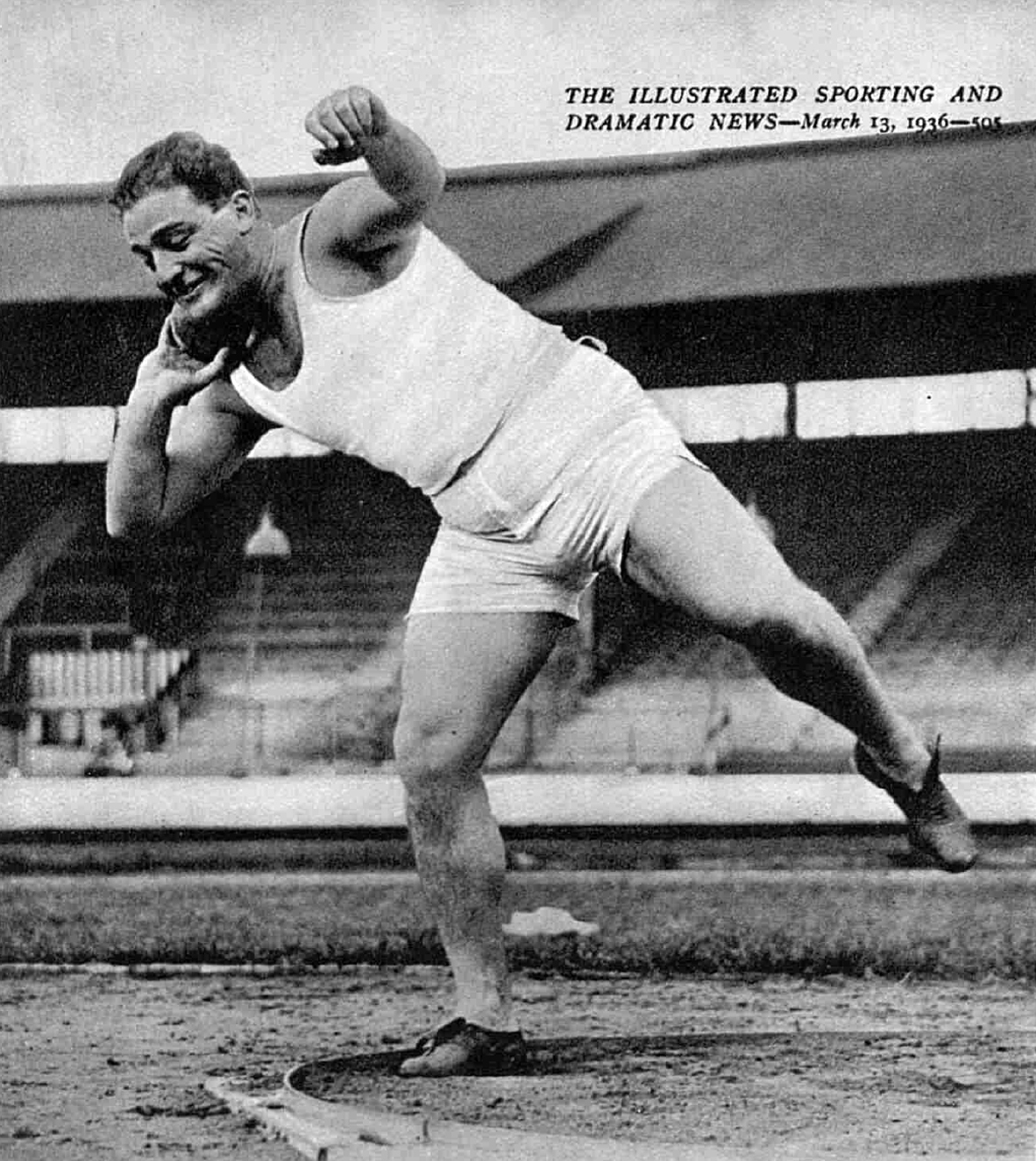
İrfan Şahinbaş representing Cambridge University against American universities at the games at White City.

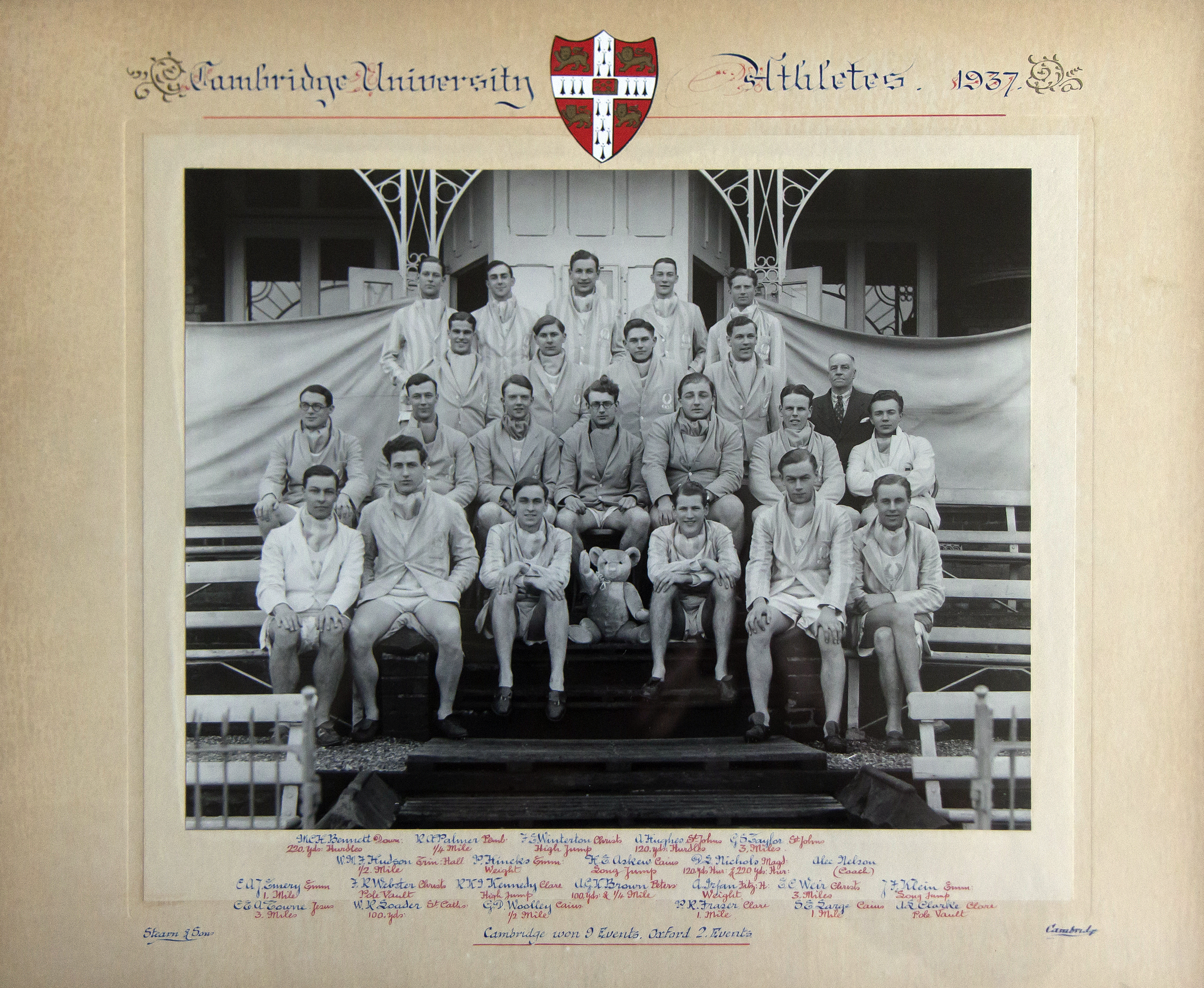
Ali İrfan Şahinbaş with the Cambridge Üniversity Athletics Team (1937). That year, Cambridge won 9 out of the 11 events against Oxford.

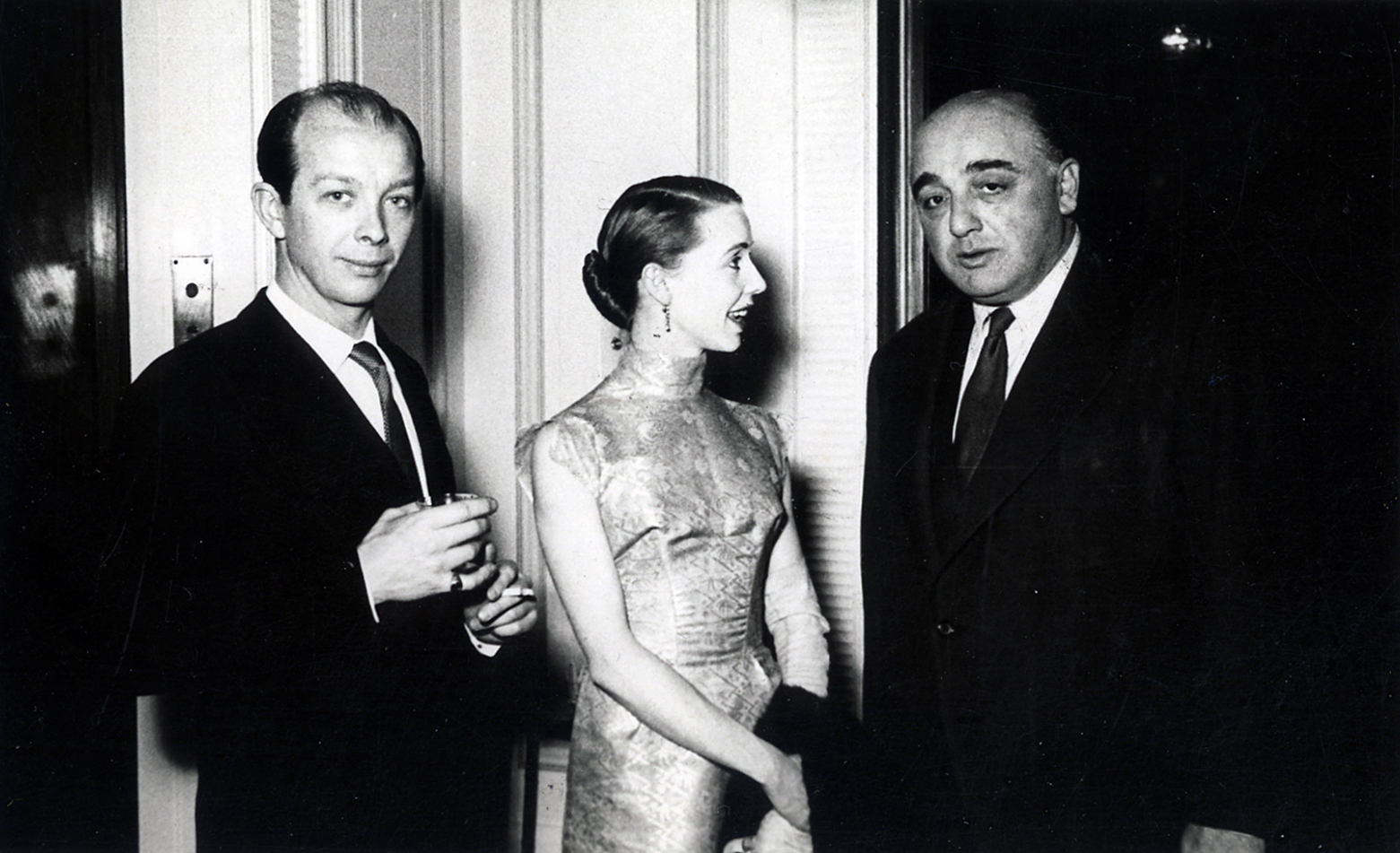
İrfan Şahinbaş with the famed English ballerina Margot Fonteyn at the British Embassy, Ankara.
