= Leblebici hor-hor agha =

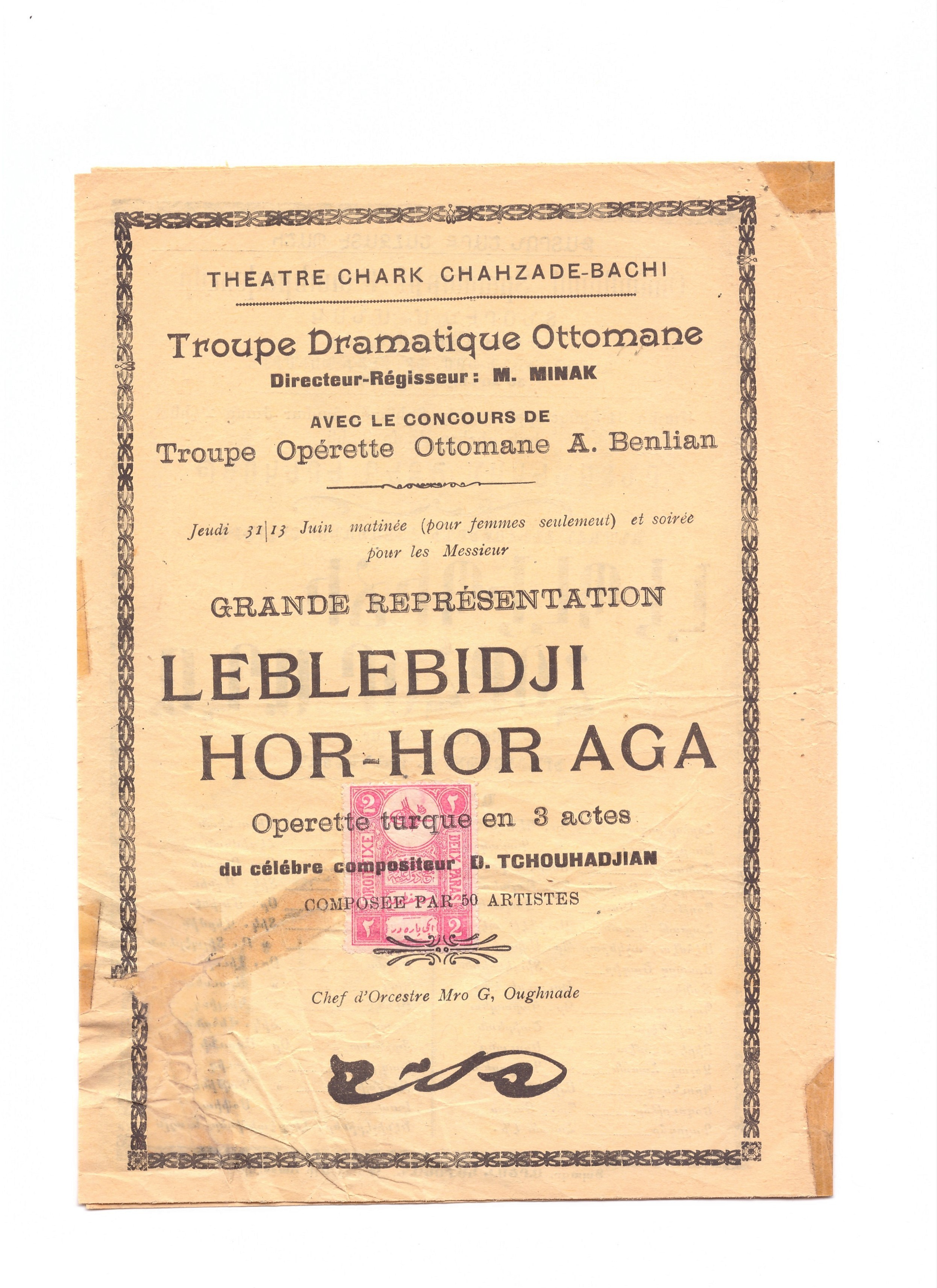
Leblebici hor-hor agha programme (1910)

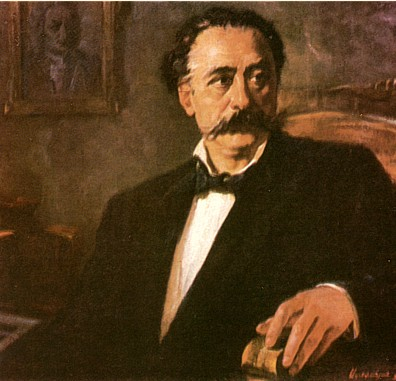
Tigran Chukhajian

Leblebici hor-hor agha (The Chickpea Seller) or Karine (Կարինե) is an 1875 operetta by the Ottoman-Armenian composer Tigran Chukhajian. Its first performance was in Turkish. It has been claimed as the first original Turkish operetta, though Chukhajian's Arif'in Hilesi (Arif's Trick) was earlier.

After that, Leblebici Horhor was shot as a silent film in 1923 under the direction of Muhsin Ertuğrul. This film was supported by the piano playing of the operetta in the movie theater while it was shown to the audience.

In 1934, the screenplay was written by Nazim Hikmet Ran by İpek Film, again under the direction of Muhsin Ertuğrul, and it was shot as a sound film under the name Leblebici Horhor Ağa. This film participated in the "Venice International Film Festival" and won an international film festival award (honorary award) for Turkey for the first time. However, it is reported that this film did not bring much profit to İpek Film.

This operetta was performed and staged as an opera by Ankara State Opera artists in 1965. It was made as a television movie in 1975.

== Bibliography ==
- Sarkisyan, Svetlana (2001). "Chukhajian, Tigran Gevorki". Grove Music Online. Oxford University Press. doi:10.1093/gmo/9781561592630.article.05728.(subscription required)
