= Atatürk Cultural Center (Samsun) =

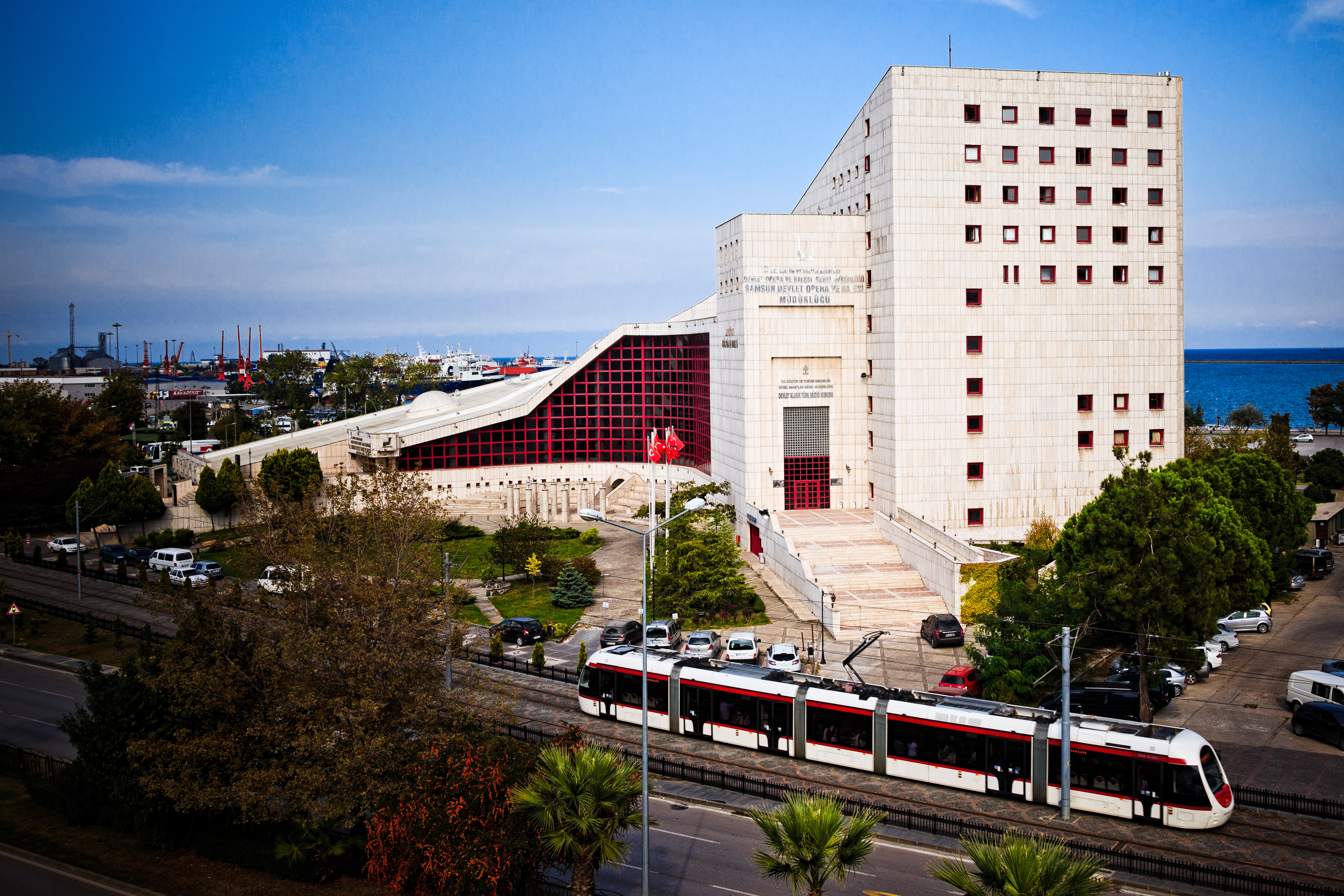
- Interactive map of Atatürk Cultural Center
- Capacity: 77,193

The Atatürk Cultural Center in Samsun is Turkey's Black Sea Region's venue for the Turkish State Opera and Ballet. Musicals are also staged.
