= Tahsin Özgüç =

Turkish Archaeologist

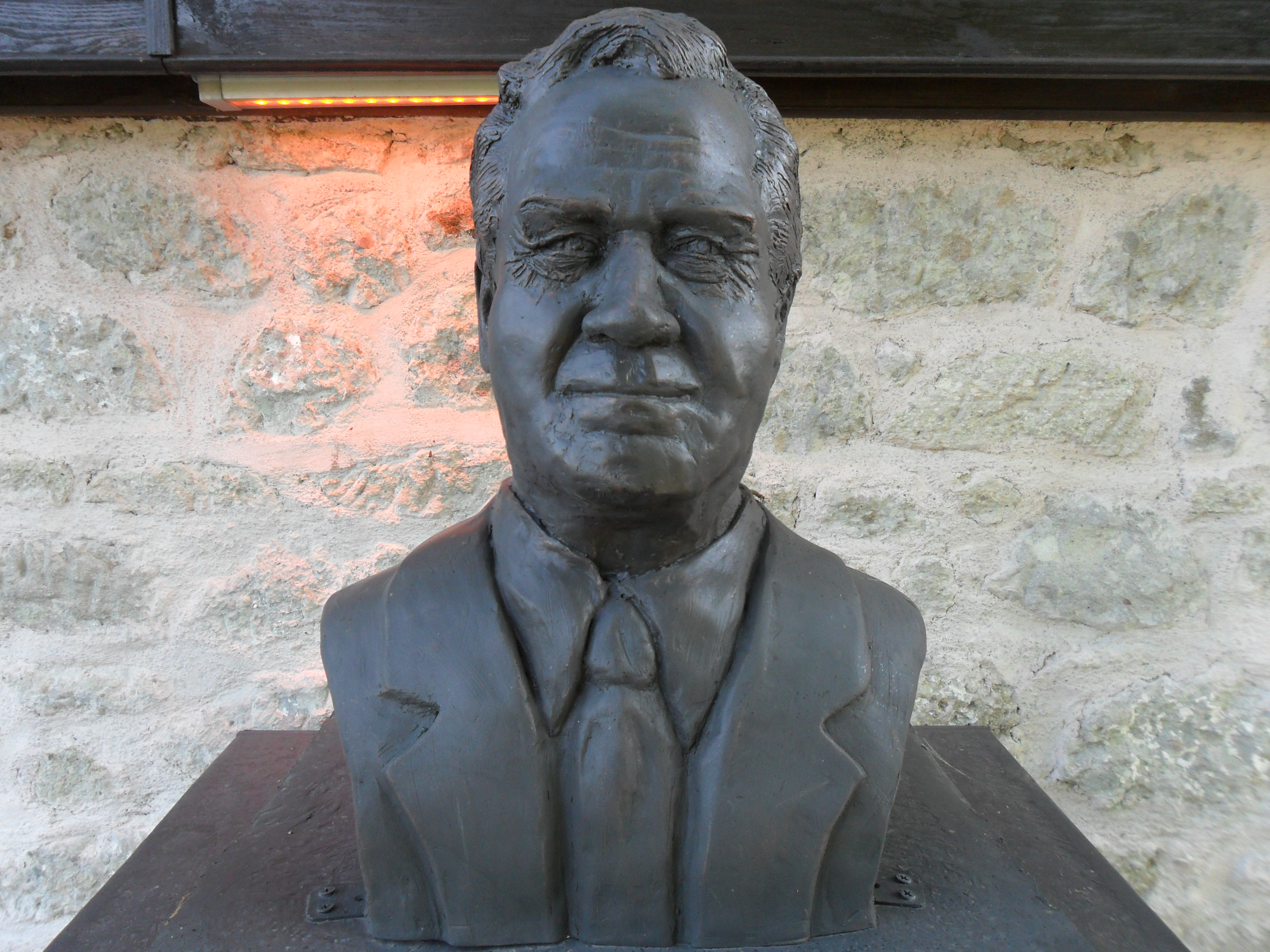
- Born: 1916; Kırcaali, Bulgaria
- Died: October 28, 2005 (aged 89); Ankara, Turkey
- Occupation: Archaeologist
- Spouse: Nimet Özgüç

Tahsin Özgüç (1916–2005) was an eminent Turkish field archaeologist. The careers of Tahsin Özgüç and his wife, Nimet Özgüç, began after World War II and lasted for nearly 60 years. He was said to be the doyen of Anatolian archaeology.

== Life ==
Tahsin Özgüç was born in Kardzhali, Bulgaria to Turkish parents. He was educated at the Faculty of Philology, History and Geography at Ankara University, graduating 1940. Following his doctorate in 1942, he married fellow archaeologist, Nimet Dinçer in 1944. At the same faculty, he became assistant between 1945 and 1946 and lecturer from 1946 to 1954, the year when he was appointed professor. Özgüç served as the dean of the faculty in the years 1968–1969. In the time between 1969 and 1980, he was rector of the same university. Following his retirement in 1981, he was five years long in charge of vice chairman of the High Education Council of Turkey.

Özgüç contributed much to Anatolian archaeology with his students, archaeological excavations and more than 100 scientific articles and books published. He lectured as guest professor from 1962 to 1964 at the Institute for Advanced Study, Princeton, New Jersey, United States, in 1964 at the Saarland University and from 1975 to 1976 at LMU Munich, Germany. He and his wife Nimet, also a professor of archaeology at Ankara University, formed a remarkable team, dominating Turkish field archaeology and its university teaching. Ozgüç was the excavator of the famous site of Kültepe (Kayseri), ancient Kanesh, where his 57 years of continuous excavation produced sensational architectural artifacts and texts, revealing in extraordinary detail the first historical period of Anatolia, that of the Assyrian merchant colonies, about 2000–1700 BC. He also led excavations in Karahöyük Elbistan, Horoztepe (Tokat), Altıntepe (Erzincan), Maşathöyük, Kazankaya and Kululu.

Özgüç was member of several scientific institutions, such as Turkish Historical Institute, German Archaeological Institute, British Academy, American Archaeological Institute, Bavarian Academy of Sciences and Humanities, City of London Archaeological Society and Institute of Archaeology in Turkey.

Tahsin Özgüç died on October 28, 2005, in Ankara. He was survived by his wife and their son. In 2010 following on from an award to his wife, a book, Cumhuriyetin Çocukları—Arkeolojinin Büyükleri: Nimet Özgüç – Tahsin Özgüç (The Children of the Republic—The Elders of Archaeology: Nimet Özgüç – Tahsin Özgüç) was published by Nursel Duruel. The book paid homage to the importance of the Özgüçs in establishing the field of archaeology in the country.

== Awards ==
- 1978 Great Cross of Merit Order of the Federal Republic of Germany,
- 1990 Order of the Rising Sun gilt and silver (5th class), Japan
- 1991 Order of the Crown, Belgium
- 1992 Turkish Publicity Foundation Award

== Honorary doctorates ==
- Free University of Berlin, Germany
- LMU Munich, Germany
- Ghent University, Belgium
