= Nimet Özgüç =

Turkish archaeologist (1916-2015)

- Born: Nimet Dinçer; 15 March 1916; Adapazarı, Ottoman Empire
- Died: 23 December 2015 (aged 99); Ankara, Turkey
- Other names: Nimet Dinçer-Özgüç
- Occupation: archaeologist
- Years active: 1940–2006

Nimet Özgüç (15 March 1916 – 23 December 2015) was a Turkish archaeologist. In her era, she and her husband were the dominant Turkish academics and archaeologists. She was made an honorary member of the Turkish Academy of Sciences in 1996 and was awarded the Grand Prize of the Ministry of Culture and Tourism in 2010 for her contributions to archaeology in the country.

== Early life ==
Nimet Dinçer was born on 15 March 1916 Adapazarı, Turkey. Her father was a public official and her mother raised the six children. Her family moved to Ankara where she completed her primary education at Gazi Elementary School and then attended the Ankara Girls' High School. Dinçer continued her education at Ankara University, as one of the first students in the department of Ancient History of the Language and History faculty, which had been established in 1935. She graduated with a bachelor's degree in 1940.

== Career ==
Immediately upon her graduation, Dinçer, who was encouraged by Afet İnan, began working as an assistant teacher of history at Ankara University, while she continued with her graduate studies. Around 1941, she began working on excavations in the Samsun Province including sites at Dündartepe, Kale Doruğu Höyüğü near Kavak and Tekkeköy. Studying with Hans Gustav Güterbock, she completed her thesis, Anadolu Damga Mühürleri (Anatolian Stamp Seals) in 1943, earning her doctorate in 1944, and that same year, married a fellow archaeologist, Tahsin Özgüç. Along with her husband, she began working on numerous excavations, including the survey of Elbistan in 1947 for the Turkish Historical Society. In a mound known as Karahöyük they discovered an inscription in Hieroglyphic Luwian on a stele describing the fall of the Hittite Empire. The following year, the couple were again sent by the Historical Society to excavate Kültepe near Kayseri. The site was one of the most important archaeological sites in Turkey, yielding tablets and artifacts which documented its place as a major trading city during the period from 2000-1700BC for the Anatolian plateau.

In 1949, Özgüç became associate professor at Ankara University and she became a full professor in 1958. She continued her work with her husband at Kültepe, and on such excavations as Frakdin (1954) and Altintepe (1959), until 1962, when she began her own project examining the Hittite center at Acemhöyük near Niğde. In 1962, she proved that an ivory artifacts presented to the Metropolitan Museum of Art in 1930, had originated in Acemhöyük.

In 1972, Özgüç began working at Tepebagları Höyük and worked on rescue of the site until 1975. She found evidence that the site had been occupied from the Iron Age to the Byzantine Era. Özgüç began work on the project at Samsat Höyük in the Adıyaman Province in 1978, during the Lower Euphrates Rescue project during the construction of the Karakaya and Atatürk Dams. She discovered significant evidence that the site was one of the two main towns in the region and an important cultural center in the Early Bronze Age, through the transition to the Middle Bronze Age. She was honored with the Guillaume Bude Medal of the Collège de France in 1980.

Özgüç retired from Ankara University in 1984, but continued her scientific work and publishing. She was granted an honorary membership to the Turkish Academy of Sciences in 1996 and was a co-awardee with Halet Çambel of the Grand Prize of the Ministry of Culture and Tourism of 2010 for her contributions to archaeology in the country. The award was presented by President Abdullah Gül on 9 February 2011. That same year, a book, Cumhuriyetin Çocukları—Arkeolojinin Büyükleri: Nimet Özgüç – Tahsin Özgüç (The Children of the Republic—The Elders of Archaeology: Nimet Özgüç – Tahsin Özgüç) was published by Nursel Duruel. The book paid homage to the importance of the Özgüçs in establishing the field of archaeology in the country.

== Death and legacy ==
Özgüç died on 23 December 2015 in Ankara and her funeral was held at Kocatepe Mosque on 25 December.

== Selected works ==
- Özgüç, Nimet (1992). "A lute player from Samsat". In Otten, Heinrich (ed.). Sedat Alp'a armağan: Festschrift für Sedat Alp. Ankara, Turkey: Türk Tarih Kurumu Basımevi. pp. 419–423.
- Özgüç, Nimet (1992). "The Uruk culture at Samsat". In Strommenger, Eva; Hrouda, Barthel; Kroll, Stephan; Spanos, Peter Z. (eds.). Von Uruk nach Tuttul: Eine Festschrift für Eva Strommenger: Studien und Aufsätze von Kollegen und Freunden (in English, French, and German). München, Germany: Profil-Verl. pp. 151–157. ISBN 978-3-890-19305-2.
- Özgüç, Nimet (1993). "An early bronze age pot is a child from Acemhöyük". In Frangipane, Marcella (ed.). Between the Rivers and Over the Mountains: Archaeologica Anatolica et Mesopotamica Alba Palmieri dedicata. Rome, Italy: Università di Roma La Sapienza. Dipartimento di scienze storiche archeologiche e antropologiche dell'antichità. pp. 517–520.
- Özgüç, N. (1994). "Notes on cylinder seals of level I ab from Karurn-Kanis". In Calmeyer, Peter; Hecker, Karl; Jakob-Rost, Liane; Walker, C.B. F. (eds.). Beiträge zur altorientalischen Archäologie und Altertumskunde: Festschrift für Barthel Hrouda zum 65. Geburtstag. Wiesbaden, Germany: Harrassowitz. pp. 217–220. ISBN 978-3-447-03503-3.
- Özgüç, N. (1994). "Identical aspects of the Cylinder and stamp seal representations of level Ib period". Istanbuler Mitteilungen (43). Istanbul, Turkey: Deutsches Archäologisches Institut, Abteilung Istanbul: 175–179. ISSN 0341-9142.
- Özgüç, N. (1995). "Silver and copper Ingots from Acemhöyük". In Dittmann, R.; Finkbeiner, U.; Hauptmann, H. (eds.). Beiträge zur Kulturgeschichte Vorderasiens : Festschrift für Rainer Michael Boehmer. Mainz, Germany: Verlag Phillip von Zabern. pp. 513–519. ISBN 978-3-805-31863-1.
- Özgüç, N. (1996). "Seal Impressions on the Kültepe documents notarized by native rulers". In Gasche, Hermann; Hrouda, Barthel (eds.). Collectanea Orientalia: Histoire, arts de le̕space et industrie de la terre; études offertes en hommage à Agnès Spycket. Neuchâtel, Paris, France: Recherches et publications. pp. 267–278. ISBN 978-2-940-03209-9.
- Özgüç, N. (1997). "The early Hellenistic findings at Samsat". Istanbuler Mitteilungen (46). Istanbul, Turkey: Deutsches Archäologisches Institut, Abteilung Istanbul: 213–216. ISSN 0341-9142.
- Özgüç, Nimet (1998). "Kanis Karumu'nda bulunmuş olan eski Assur üslubunda İki silindir mühür". In Arsebük, Güven (ed.). Light on the top of the Black Hill: Studies presented to Halet Çambel/Karatepe' deki Işık [The Assyrian style found in Kanis Karumu's two-cylinder seal] (in Turkish). Istanbul, Turkey: Ege Yayınları. pp. 611–614. ISBN 978-9-758-07020-6.
- Özgüç, Nimet (2001). "Notes on the bronze vehicle from the Sarıkaya Palace at Acemhöyük". In van Soldt, Wilfred H. (ed.). Veenhof Anniversary Volume (in English, French, and German). Leiden, The Nederlands: L`Institut historique-archéologique néerlandais de Stamboul, Nederlands Instituut voor het Nabije Oosten. pp. 361–366.
- Özgüç, N. (2002). "Götterprozessionen, Kriegs- und Jagdszenen. Ein Überblick über den Motivreichturn anatolischer Roll- und Stempelsiegel des 20.-18. Jahrhunderts v. Chr". In Kültür Bakanlığı (ed.). Die Hethiter und ihr Reich: das Volk der 1000 Götter: [anlässlich der Ausstellung "Die Hethiter. Das Volk der 1000 Götter" vom 18. Januar bis 28. April 2002 in der Kunst- und Ausstellungshalle der Bundesrepublik Deutschland in Bonn] [God Regiments, War and Hunting Stages: Motif richness in Anatolian Cylinders and Stamp Seals for centuries BC 20-18] (in German) (Buchhandelsausg. ed.). Stuttgart, Germany: Konrad Theiss Verlag. pp. 234–239. ISBN 978-3-806-21676-9.
- Özgüç, N. (2002). "Erlesene Werke der Kleinkunst. Anatolische Elfenbeinschnitzereien". In Kültür Bakanlığı (ed.). Die Hethiter und ihr Reich: das Volk der 1000 Götter: [anlässlich der Ausstellung "Die Hethiter. Das Volk der 1000 Götter" vom 18. Januar bis 28. April 2002 in der Kunst- und Ausstellungshalle der Bundesrepublik Deutschland in Bonn] [Selected works: Anatolian Ivory Carvings] (in German) (Buchhandelsausg. ed.). Stuttgart, Germany: Konrad Theiss Verlag. pp. 244–247. ISBN 978-3-806-21676-9.
- Özgüç, Nimet (2003). Hatti efsanesi yılan Ĭlluyanka'nın tasvir sanatında yorumu (in Turkish) (1st ed.). Ankara, Turkey: Türkiye Bilimler Akademisi Forumu. ISBN 975-8593-41-2.
