= Özsoy =

Turkish opera

Özsoy (or Fereydun) is an opera composed by Ahmet Adnan Saygun from a libretto by Münir Hayri Egeli. It was the first Turkish opera composed during the country's Republican period under Mustafa Kemal Atatürk and it was given its premiere performance in the Halk Evi Theatre in Ankara on 19 June 1934.

The opera tells the story of twin brothers Tur and Īraj in three parts. Its theme, proposed by Atatürk, draws from the famous poetic opus, Shahnameh, which was written by the Persian poet Ferdowsi around 1000 AD. Tur symbolizes the Turkish people, living in "Tūrān", all the lands north and east of the Oxus, while Iraj symbolizes the Iranian people, living in Iran.

The premiere was attended by Mustafa Kemal and his official guest, the Shah of Iran, Shah Reza Pahlavi, since a major theme of the opera was the long-standing friendship between the Turkish and Persian peoples. Following that performance, the two leaders met at the Ministry of Foreign Affairs to establish the basis of friendship and cooperation for the two new nations, the Republic of Turkey and the Imperial State of Iran (Pahlavi Dynasty).

== Synopsis ==
Hakan Feridun (Fereydun Khan) has twin sons; Tur (Wolf) and Īraj (Lion). Right after their birth, the two brothers fall victim to the Devil's wrath, and they become separated, each living in a different land. Many years later, they find each other and discover that they are twin brothers.
