= Ankara Opera House =

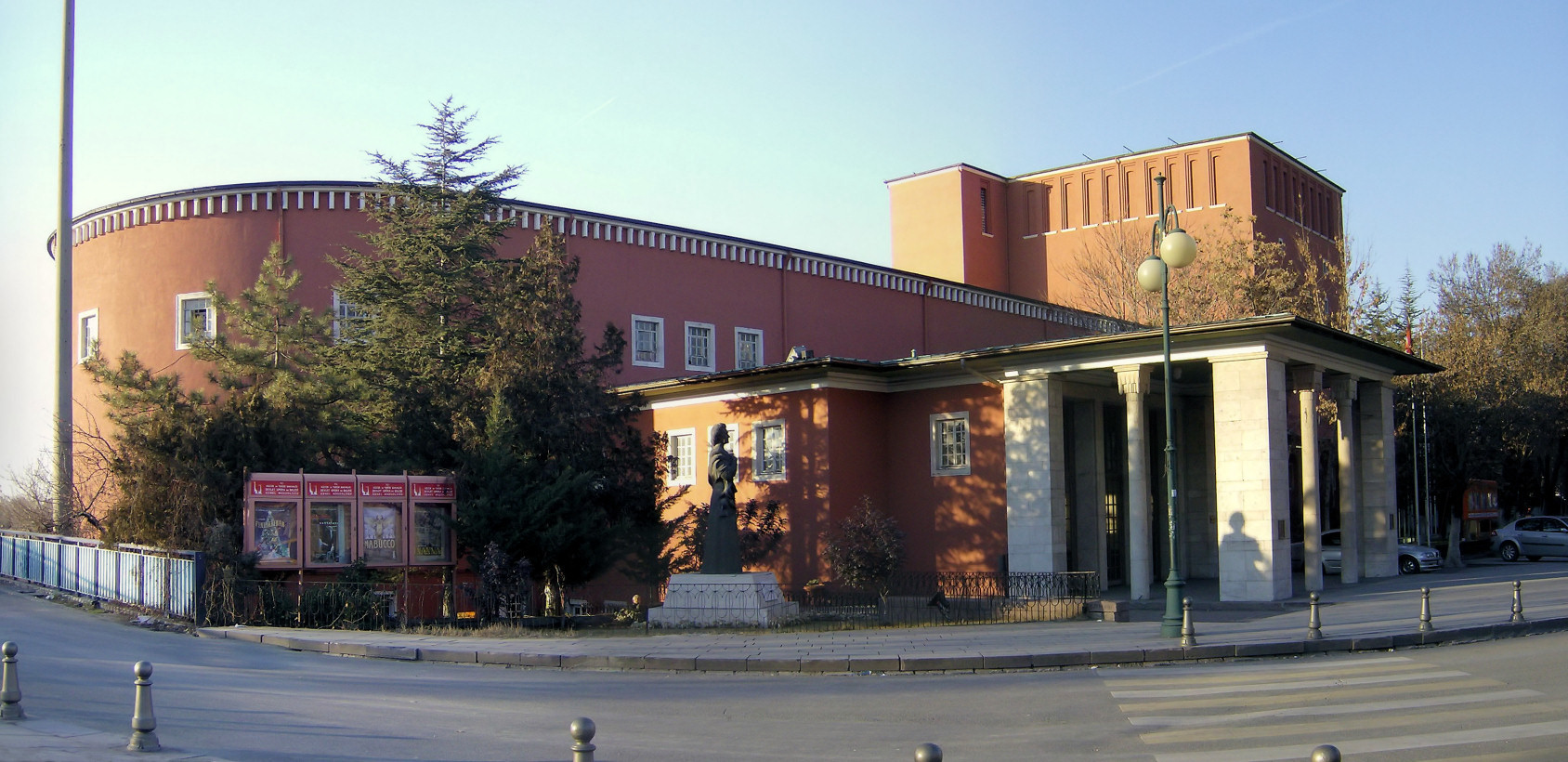
- View of Ankara Opera House

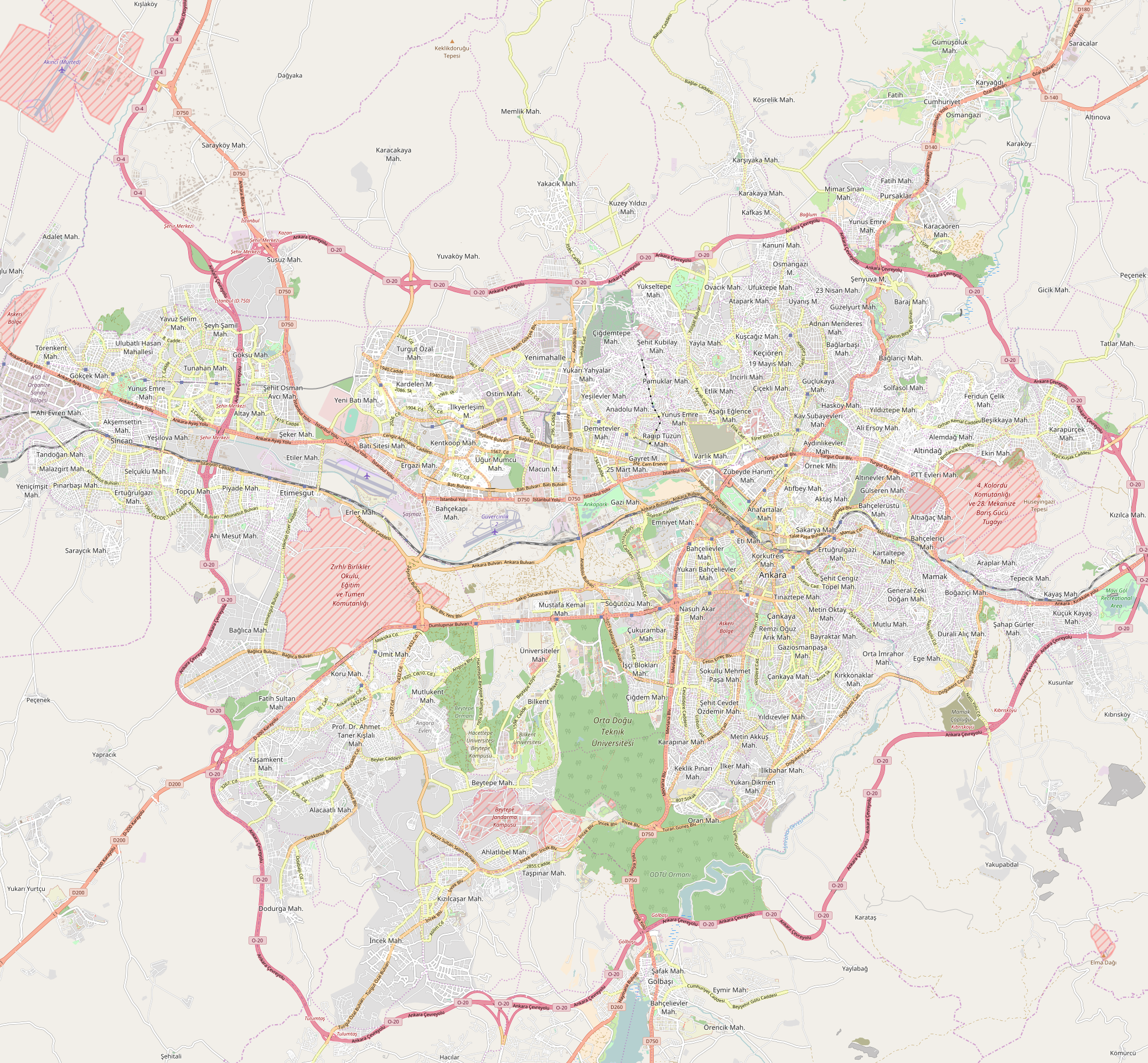
- Location within Ankara Location within Turkey
- Former names: Ankara Exhibition House
- Alternative names: Ankara Grand Theatre

General information
- Architectural style: Turkish New Regionalism
- Location: Ankara, Turkey, Ankara, Türkiye
- Coordinates: 39.9355°N 32.8605°E
- Completed: Ankara Exhibition House: 30 October 1934 Ankara Opera House: 2 April 1948
- Owner: Ministry of Culture and Tourism

Design and construction
- Architects: Şevki Balmumcu, Paul Bonatz

Ankara Opera House (Turkish: Opera Sahnesi) of the Turkish State Opera and Ballet, also called the Grand Theater, is the first and only Opera House of Ankara, located in the Altındağ district along Atatürk Boulevard.

The building was originally designed by the Turkish architect Şevki Balmumcu as an exhibition center, who came first in an international competition for the project in 1933. It was later converted into an opera house by the German architect Paul Bonatz, and started serving this function on April 2, 1948.

== History ==
Since its construction, the building has two distinct phases in its lifetime.

=== 1933-46: Şevki Balmucu's 'Exhibition House' ===
The building was initially constructed as the Ankara Exhibition House, designed by Turkish architect Şevki Balmumcu in the International Style.

The first idea to build an exhibition house in Ankara came to the agenda with a competition held by the National Economy and Savings Society in 1933. It was intended to host exhibitions on agriculture, industry, fine arts, and public health. According to the rules stated in the competition announcement, the project to be built had to be in accordance with modern architecture, and its cost had not exceeded the budget determined by the society. In this context, the elimination process began with 26 projects, 10 belonging to foreign participants, being sent to the competition. In the process, the projects of Italian architect Paolo Vietti-Violi and Turkish architect Şevki Balmumcu made it to the finals. However, since Violi's project could not be financially realized, Balmumcu was announced as the competition winner.

It was one of the early and important examples of modernist architecture in Republican Turkey, with reinforced concrete construction, strip windows, a skylighted roof, and minimalist façades.

=== 1946–1948: Transformation into Opera House ===
Only 13 years after its opening, the building was converted into the State Theatre and Opera House by the projects prepared by German architect Paul Bonatz, with the idea that there was no stage in Ankara for performances such as theatre and opera, and an exhibition building was not necessary in the city context. Despite criticism that a theatre-opera stage could not be obtained by converting an existing structure, the renovation began in 1946 and was completed in 1948.

The transformed building adopted elements of the Second National Architecture Movement, emphasizing a more nationalized and monumental aesthetic. The transformation included the addition of a fly tower, colonnaded entrance, sloped roof, and interior ornamentation, including plaster motifs, chandeliers, stained glass, and wall paintings by notable artists such as Cemal Tollu and Bedri Rahmi Eyüboğlu.

=== 2017-2021: Restoration ===
Oraybir Construction and Restoration led a comprehensive restoration between 2017 and 2021. The project aimed to restore the building to its transformed original phase, as conceived by Bonatz, rather than revert to Balmumcu's initial design. Restoration efforts were carried out while maintaining the building's function as an opera hall. The restoration process is detailed in the book "Ankara State Opera and Ballet Building: Restoration Construction Site Diary, 2017-2021."

== See also ==
- Turkish State Opera and Ballet
- Turkish State Theatres

== Gallery ==
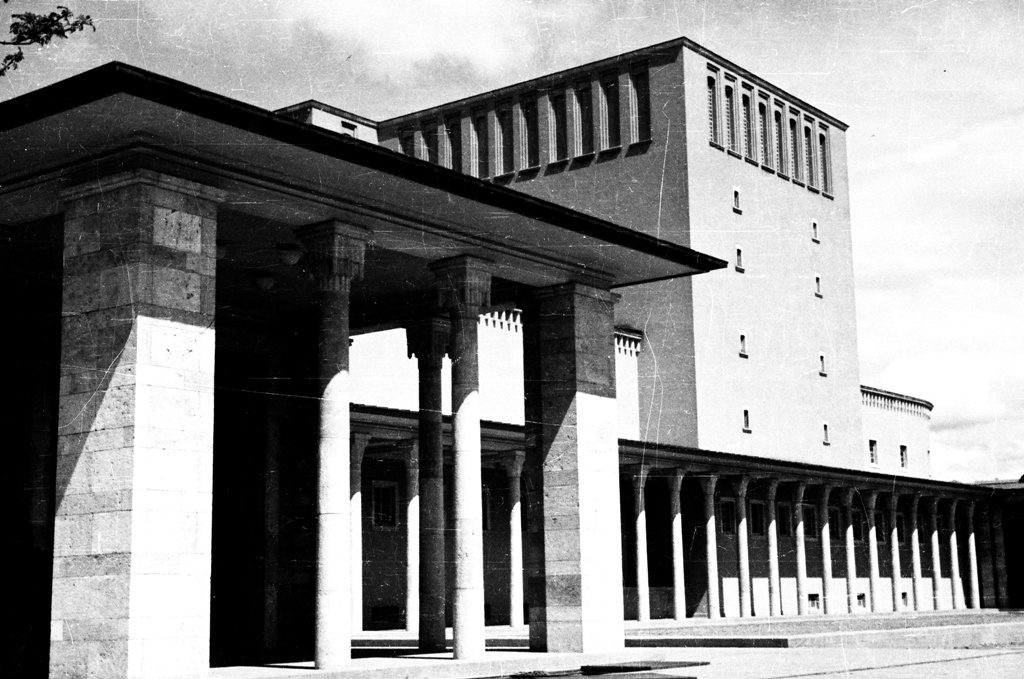
Historical photo

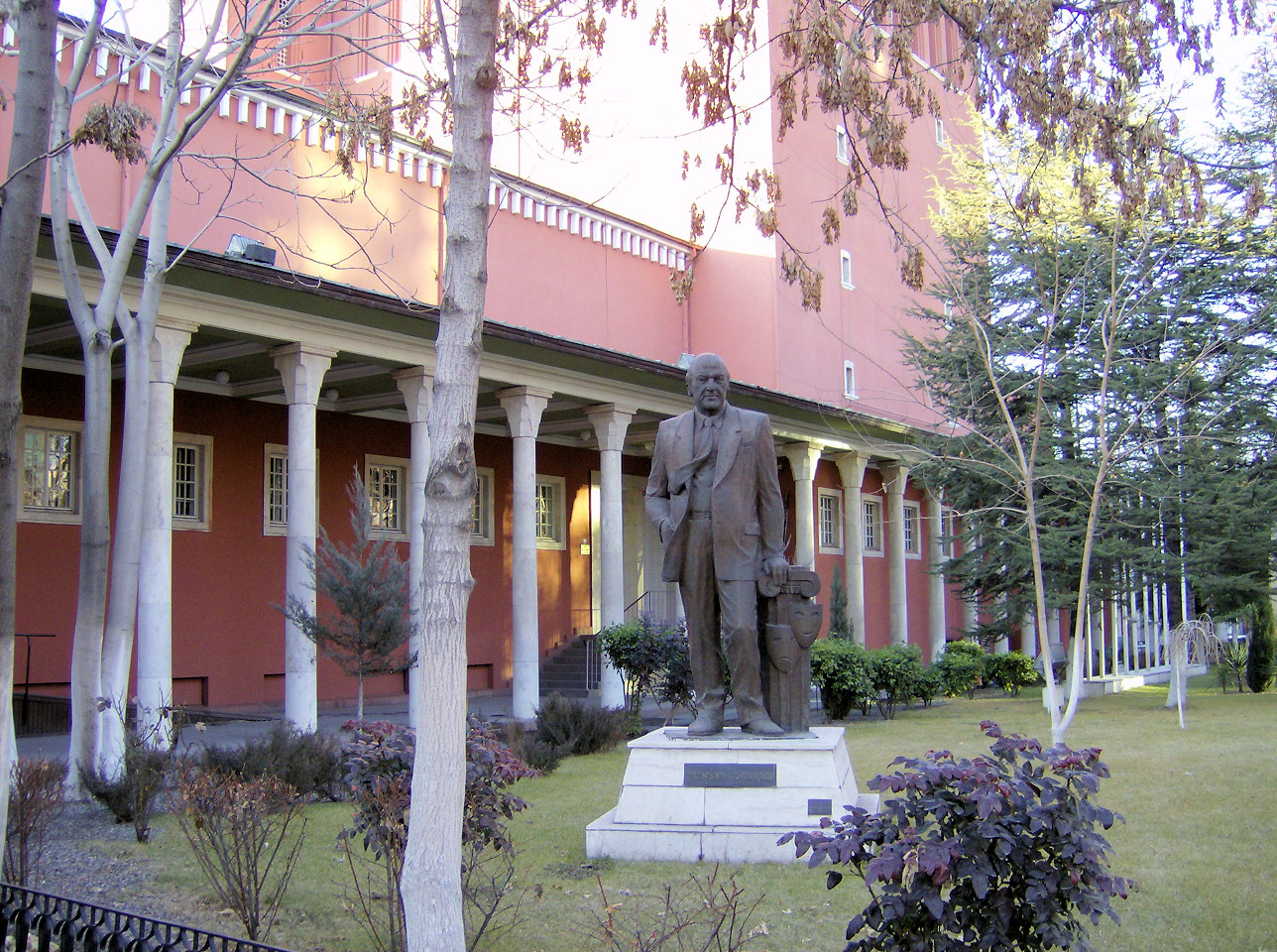
Statue of Cüneyt Gökçer in front of Ankara Opera House

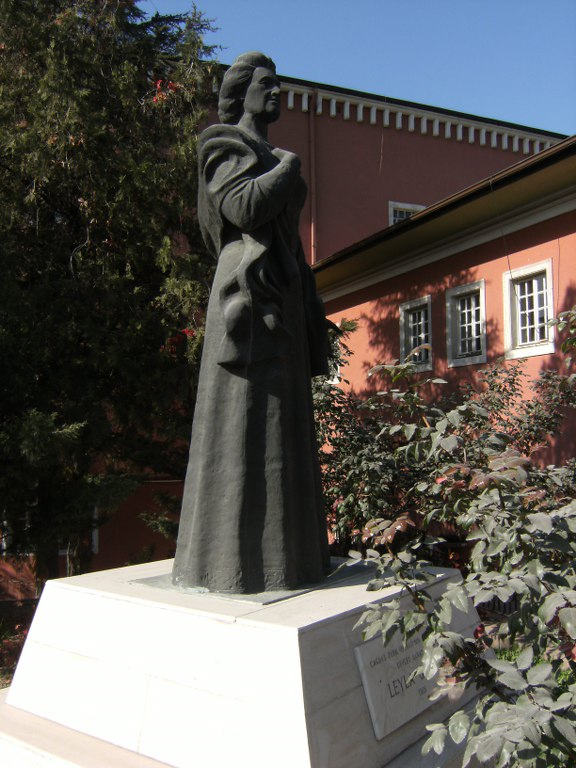
Leyla Gencer monument (opera garden)

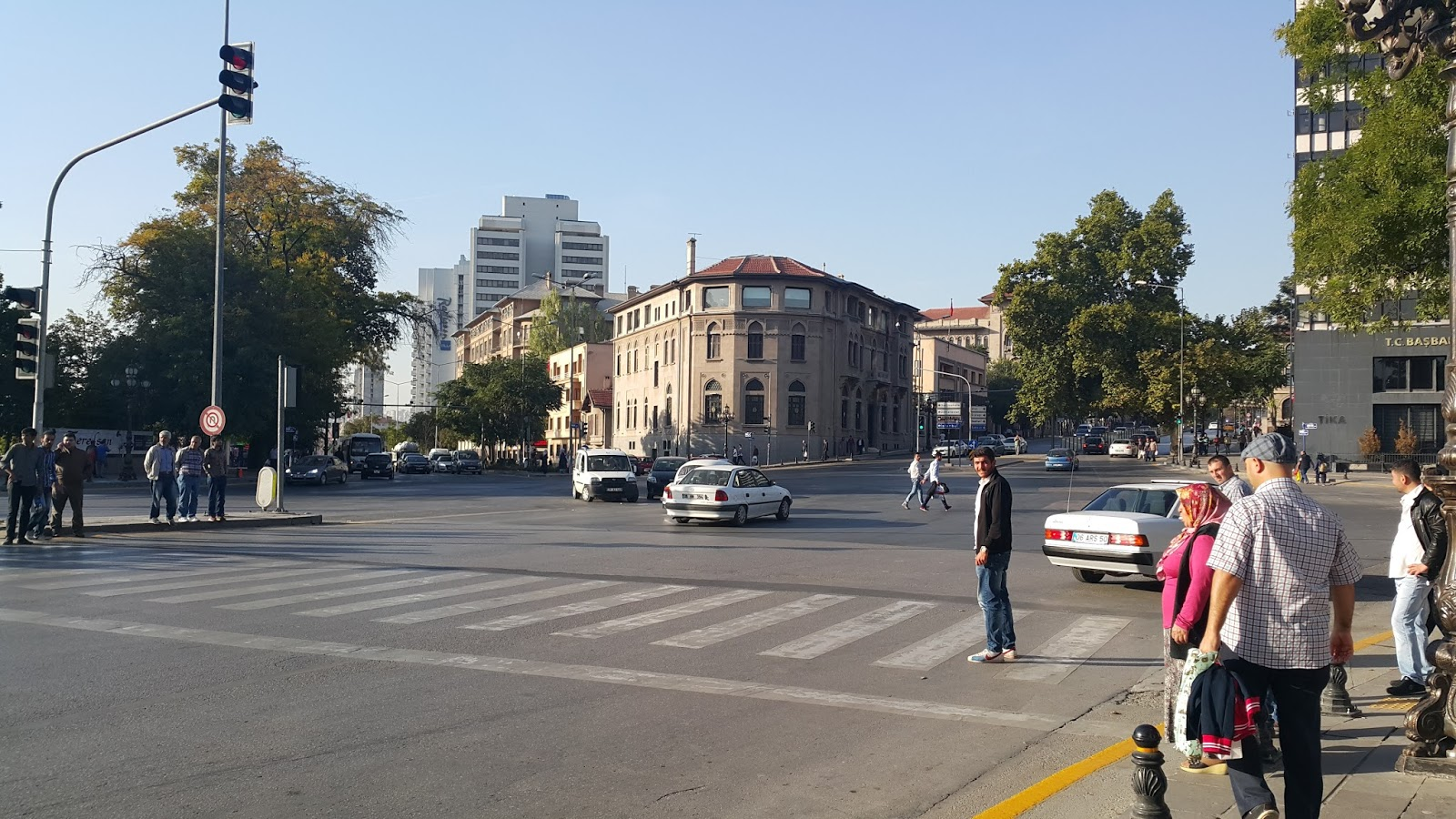
Opera junction

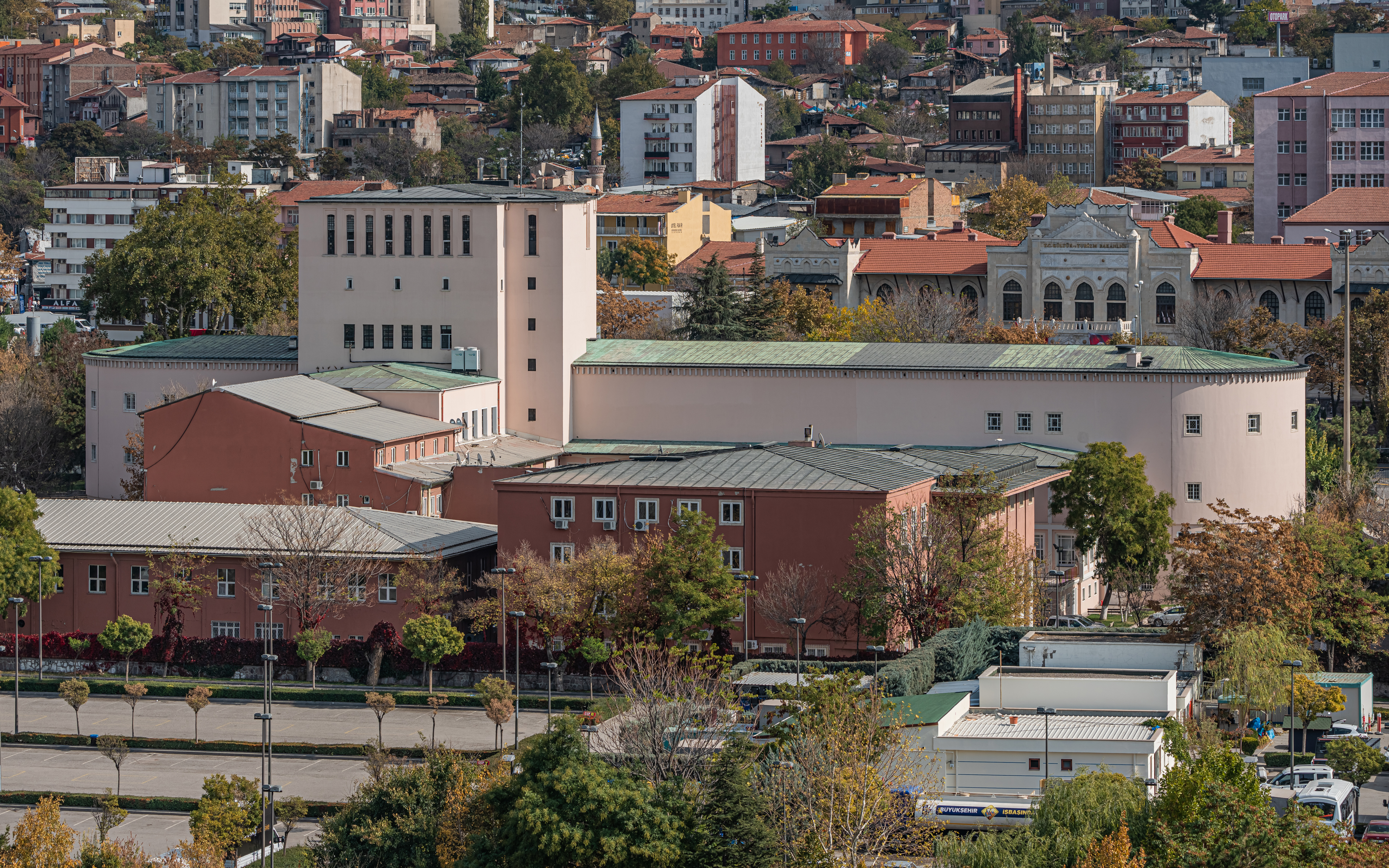
View from the Gençlik Parkı
