= Yunus Emre Oratorio =

Oratorio by Ahmed Adnan Saygun

Yunus Emre Oratorio is an oratorio written by Ahmed Adnan Saygun in 1942. It was first staged in 1946 with the support of İsmet İnönü, the president of Turkey at the time. Since then it has been translated in many languages and performed in various countries, including Hungary, Austria, Germany, and the Vatican.

"Op.26 Yunus Emre Oratorio named after and using texts from the eponymous Anatolian mystic ( c. 1240 - 1320 ), Saygun reorganized Yunus Emre’s poems thematically from the poet’s Divan (poetic collection), as a reflection on Yunus Emre’s spiritual journey from contemplating death to reuniting with the divine lover, God.

Composing the oratorio helped Saygun aesthetically and stylistically to discover his musical medium. The oratorio is a unique piece because of the amalgamated nature of different idiomatic sources and styles—the structural elements of Saygun’s oratorio evoking a full spectrum of Turkish materials"
