= Ahmet Adnan Saygun =

Turkish composer (1907–1991)

- Born: 7 September 1907; İzmir, Ottoman Empire
- Died: 6 January 1991 (aged 83); Istanbul, Turkey
- Occupations: Composer, musicologist, writer

Ahmed Adnan Saygun (Turkish pronunciation: [ahˈmet adˈnan sajˈɡun]; 7 September 1907 – 6 January 1991) was a Turkish composer and musicologist.

One of a group of composers known as the Turkish Five who pioneered western classical music in Turkey, his works show a mastery of Western musical practice, while also incorporating traditional Turkish folk songs and culture. When alluding to folk elements he tends to spotlight one note of the scale and weave a melody around it, based on a Turkish mode. His extensive output includes five symphonies, five operas, two piano concertos, concertos for violin, viola and cello, and a wide range of chamber and choral works.

The Times called him "the grand old man of Turkish music, who was to his country what Jean Sibelius is to Finland, what Manuel de Falla is to Spain, and what Béla Bartók is to Hungary". Saygun's formative years in Turkey coincided with the radical changes in his country's politics and culture as the reforms of Mustafa Kemal Atatürk had replaced the Ottoman Empire – which had lasted nearly 600 years – with a new secular republic based on Western models and traditions. As Atatürk created a new cultural identity for his people and the newly founded nation, Saygun became a staunch believer in and an ardent follower of Atatürk's reforms.

== Biography ==
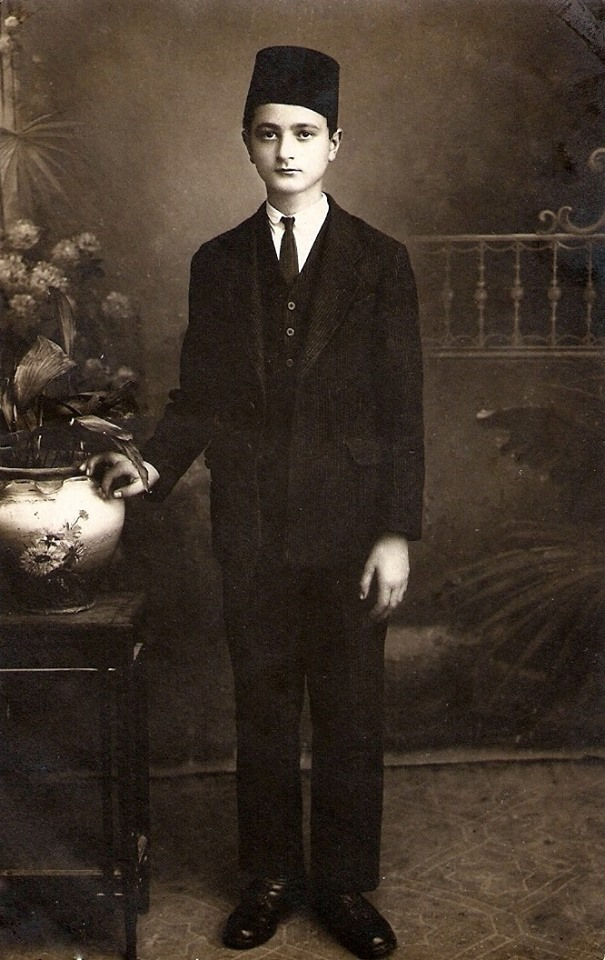
Saygun in his youth

Ahmed Adnan Saygun was born in 1907 in İzmir, then part of the Ottoman Empire – in today's Republic of Türkiye. There were frequent concerts given by the Ottoman military bands, and performances of Western works by chamber music ensembles at the time and this influenced Saygun to start his first music lessons in elementary school. He started playing the piano, the Ottoman short-necked lute and the oud at an early age and quickly found his passion writing music at the age of fourteen. His father who was a mathematics teacher and scholar of religions and literature taught him English and French as well as world religions at an early age. Through rigorous study Saygun was able to translate the music section of the French Grande Encyclopédie into a music encyclopedia in Turkish. While in high school, he continued his music lessons with lessons in school as well as from a private teacher and through a theory book which he was given at an early age. In 1926, only two years after his graduation from high school he was appointed as teacher of music at a high school in his native city of İzmir.

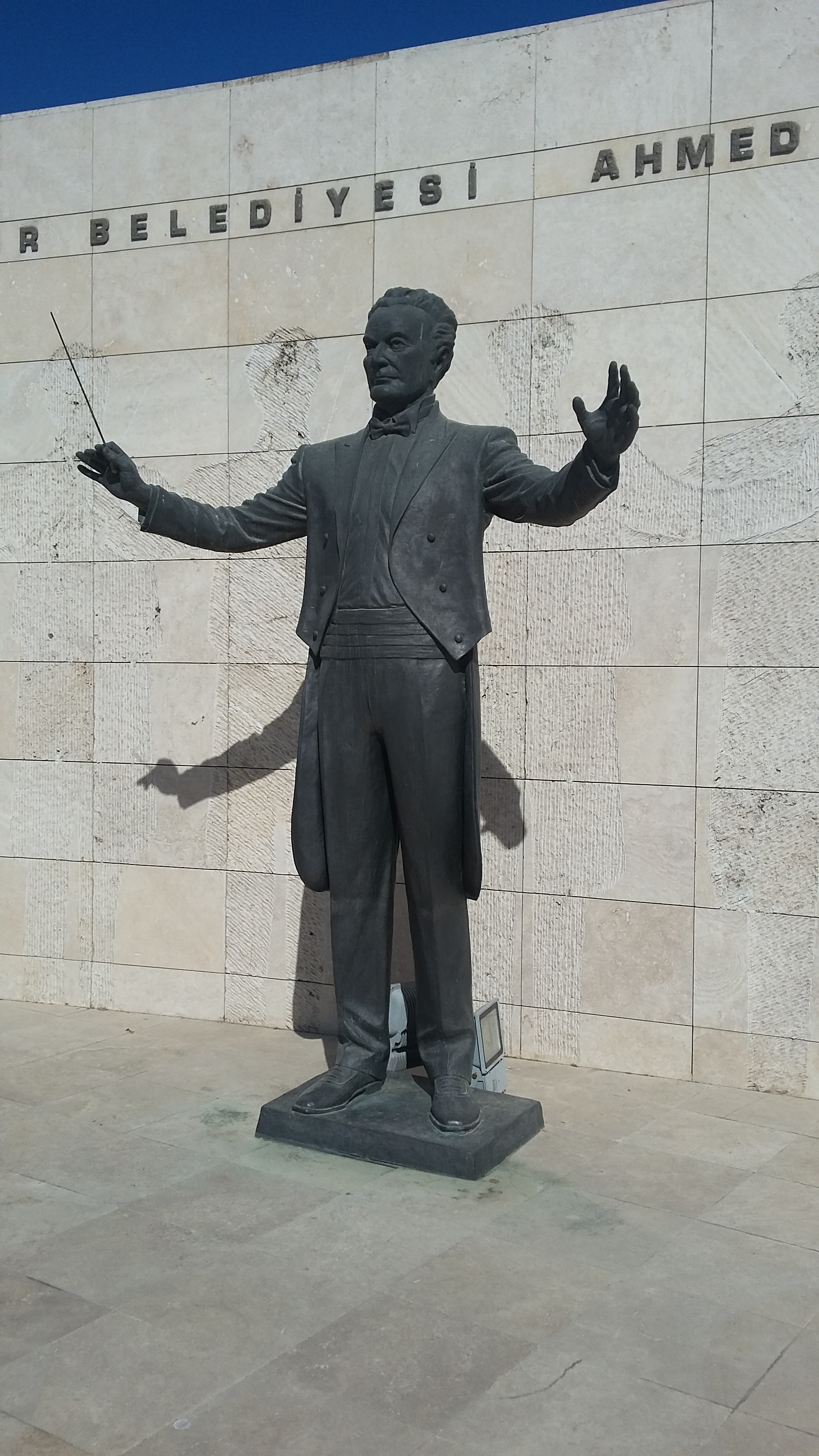
Statue of Saygun at Ahmet Adnan Saygun Arts Center

In 1928 he was recognized nationally and received a grant to study in France by the Turkish state. He attended the Schola Cantorum de Paris where he studied composition with Vincent d'Indy, theory and counterpoint with Eugène Borrel, organ with Édouard Souberbielle and Gregorian chant with Amédée Gastoué. He was further introduced to late-romantic music and French impressionism. During this time his imagination flourished, enabling him to write his first large work for orchestra: Divertimento. This piece won him an award in 1931 in Paris and was performed with great success the same year in Poland and former USSR. In 1931 he returned to Turkey as a music teacher for a new establishment found by Mustafa Kemal Atatürk that aimed to train music teachers with respect to the new law of arts. This suggested that previous training standards had to be changed to meet Western musical standards. Musical education adopted Western musical practices as part of this new era in Turkey.

In 1934 he was appointed as the conductor of the prestigious Presidential Symphony Orchestra. That very same year Atatürk approached Saygun, asking him to write the first Turkish opera. As Saygun was a huge follower of Atatürk he accepted his offer with great warmth and in two months time finished writing the first Turkish opera, Özsoy. The opera's theme was the historical friendship between the peoples of Turkey and Iran. Following Özsoy's success Atatürk asked Saygun to write another opera suggesting the heroism of the Turks and Atatürk's devotion to his country and people.

Saygun quickly finished his second opera Taşbebek in that very same year. This was the year that marked Saygun's career as the musical voice of the newly founded Republic of Türkiye. He now was the musical symbol of his country and had dedicated his works and life for the people and his country, like his great admirer Atatürk.

Following the operas, he was neglected in Ankara State Conservatory by its founder Paul Hindemith. He moved to Istanbul and became a member of the theory department at the Istanbul Municipal Conservatory. In 1936 Béla Bartók visited Turkey to research the native folk music. Saygun accompanied Bartók on his travels around the country, collecting and transcribing folk songs all through the Anatolia and Osmaniye (a region of Adana), Turkey. Saygun gained immense knowledge of Bartók's style of writing during this trip and learned a great deal about string quartets: they became great friends.

In 1939 he was invited back to Ankara to further promote Western musical activities and practices. A year later he formed his own organization, Ses ve Tel Birliği, which showcased recitals and concerts throughout the country, further developing public knowledge of Western classical music.

Saygun's international acclaim flourished with his oratorio Yunus Emre in 1946. This is an hour-long work written for four vocal soloists, a full chorus and full orchestra that sets a number of poems by the 13th century Anatolian mystic poet Yunus Emre. This work captures Yunus Emre's legacy with the use of Turkish modes and folk melodies, although it is written in the post-romantic style. Since its premiere in Ankara in 1947, the oratorio has been translated into five languages and performed worldwide, including a performance in English at the United Nations led by conductor Leopold Stokowski with the NBC Symphony Orchestra in 1958. This same year he won the Stella della solidarietà and the Jean Sibelius composition awards.

The success of Yunus Emre encouraged Saygun to compose further large-scale works. In the 1950s he wrote three new operas, his first two symphonies, a piano concerto, and several pieces of chamber music pieces, of which a Paris premiere of the first string quartet (1954) and a premiere of the second string quartet (1958) in New York City performed by the Juilliard String Quartet gained him further international exposure. There followed, amongst other works, three more symphonies, concertos for violin and viola and a second piano concerto, and a third string quartet. A fourth quartet remained unfinished at his death.

Saygun was known not only as a composer but also as a scholar as he wrote and published many books on the teaching of music. In 1954, the Turkish Language Association published a brochure of accepted musical terms, authored by Saygun. He was also an ethnomusicologist and a teacher. He greatly influenced the development of western music in Turkey and helped to establish several new music conservatories, and was also a member of the National Education Council and the board of the Turkish Radio and Television Corporation. Starting in 1972, he taught composition and ethnomusicology at the Istanbul State Conservatory (later connected to the Mimar Sinan University and named "Mimar Sinan State Conservatory" in 1986). Following his death, the Ahmed Adnan Saygun Center for Music Research at Bilkent University in Ankara, Turkey, was founded where his original manuscripts and archives are also kept.

His works were played by orchestras such as NBC Symphony Orchestra, Vienna Philharmonic, Vienna Symphony, Berlin Symphony Orchestra, Munich Philharmonic, Bavarian Radio Symphony Orchestra, NDR Radiophilharmonie Hannover and numerous others.

The German label CPO has launched a series of works in memoriam of the 100th birthday of the composer in 2007. The records are including Symphonies 1, 2, 3, 4, 5, Piano Concertos 1, 2, Violin Concerto, Viola Concerto, Cello Concerto, Anatolian Suite and String Quartets 1, 2, 3, 4.

Turkish music historian Emre Aracı published a comprehensive biography and catalogue of Saygun in 2001, published in Turkish, based on his 1999 PhD thesis from the University of Edinburgh.

== Works ==
=== Operas ===
- Op. 9 Özsoy (one act), 1934
- Op. 11 Taşbebek (one act), 1934
- Op. 28 Kerem (three acts), 1947–52
- Op. 52 Köroğlu (three acts, based on the Epic of Koroghlu), 1973
- Op. 65 Gılgameş, 1964–1983

=== Ballets ===
- Op. 17 Bir Orman Masalı (A Forest Tale), 1939–43
- Op. 75 Kumru Efsanesi (Legend of Kumru), 1986–89

=== Orchestral ===
- Op. 1 Divertimento, (large orchestra with saxophone and darbuka), 1930
- Op. 10/b İnci's Book (symphonic arrangement), 1944
- Op. 13 Magic Dance, 1934
- Op. 14 Suite for Orchestra, 1936
- Op. 24 Halay, 1943
- Op. 29 Symphony No. 1, 1953
- Op. 30 Symphony No. 2, 1958
- Op. 39 Symphony No. 3, 1960
- Op. 53 Symphony No. 4, 1974
- Op. 57 Ritual Dance, 1975
- Op. 70 Symphony No. 5, 1985
- Op. 72 Variations for Orchestra, 1985

=== Vocal/choral-orchestral ===
- Op. 3 Laments (tenor solo and male choir), 1932
- Op. 6 Kızılırmak Türküsü (folk song for soprano), 1933
- Op. 16 Masal Lied (baritone solo), 1940
- Op. 19 Cantata in the Old Style (soloists and chorus), 1941
- Op. 21 Geçen Dakikalarım (baritone solo), 1941
- Op. 23 Four Folk Songs, 1945
- Op. 26 Yunus Emre, oratorio (soloists, choir, orchestra), 1942
- Op. 41 Ten Folk Songs, 1968
- Op. 54 Laments - Book II (tenor solo, male voices), 1974
- Op. 60 Mediations on Men I, 1977
- Op. 61 Mediations on Men II, 1977
- Op. 63 Mediations on Men III, 1983
- Op. 64 Mediations on Men IV, 1978
- Op. 66 Mediations on Men V, 1978
- Op. 67 Epics on Atatürk and Anatolia, 1981
- Op. 69 Mediations on Men VI, 1984

=== Concertante ===
- Op. 34 Piano Concerto No. 1, 1952–58
- Op. 44 Violin Concerto, 1967
- Op. 59 Viola Concerto, 1977
- Op. 71 Piano Concerto No. 2, 1985
- Op. 74 Cello Concerto, 1987

=== Chamber ===
- Op. 4 Intuitions (two clarinets), 1933
- Op. 8 Percussion Quartet (clarinet, saxophone, piano, percussion), 1933
- Op. 12 Sonata (piano-cello), 1935
- Op. 20 Sonata (piano- violin), 1941
- Op. 27 String Quartet No. 1, 1947
- Op. 33 Demet, Suite for violin and piano,1955
- Op. 35 String Quartet No. 2, 1957
- Op. 37 Trio (oboe, clarinet, harp), 1966
- Op. 43 String Quartet No. 3, 1966
- Op. 46 Wind Quintet, 1968
- Op. 49 Deyiş "Dictum" (strings), 1970
- Op. 50 Three Preludes (two harps), 1971
- Op. 55 Trio (oboe, clarinet, piano), 1975
- Op. 62 Concerto da Camera (strings), 1978
- Op. 68 Three Folk Songs for Four Harps, 1983
- Op. 78 String Quartet No. 4, two movements, 1990

=== Instrumental ===
- Op. 31 Partita for Cello, 1954
- Op. 36 Partita for Violin, 1961

=== Piano ===
- Op. 2 Suites for Piano, 1931
- Op. 10/a İnci's Book, 1934
- Op. 15 Piano Sonatina, 1938
- Op. 25 From Anatolia, 1945
- Op. 38 Ten Etudes on "Aksak" Rhythms, 1964
- Op. 45 Twelve Preludes on "Aksak" Rhythms,1967
- Op. 47 Fifteen Pieces on "Aksak" Rhythms, 1967
- Op. 58 Ten Sketches on "Aksak" Rhythms, 1976
- Op. 51 Short Things, 1950–52
- Op. 56 Ballade (two pianos), 1975
- Op. 73 Poem for Three Pianos, 1986
- Op. 76 Piano Sonata, 1990

=== Choral ===
- Op. 5 Folk Song, 1933
- Op. 7 Çoban Armağanı, 1933
- Op. 18 Dağlardan Ovalardan, 1939
- Op. 22 Bir Tutam Kekik, 1943, last section variations on Kâtibim
- Op. 42 Impressions (three female voices), 1935

=== Vocal ===
- Op. 32 Three Ballades, 1955
- Op. 48 Four Melodies, 1977

== See also ==
- Turkish State Opera and Ballet
- Ahmed Adnan Saygun Arts Center
- Anthology of Turkish Piano Music, Vol. I (Sheet Music)
- Anthology of Turkish Piano Music, Vol. II (Sheet Music)
- Anthology of Turkish Piano Music, Vol. III (Sheet Music)
