= Arif'in Hilesi =

Opera by Tigran Chukhajian

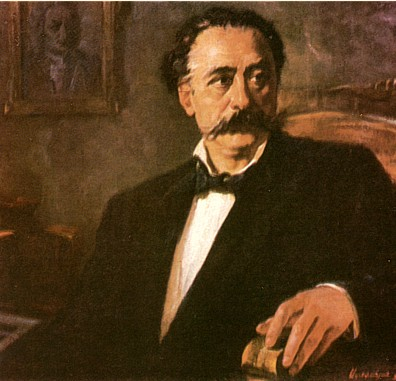
Tigran Chukhajian

Arif'in Hilesi (Arif's Trick) is an 1874 Turkish-language opera by the Armenian composer Tigran Chukhajian (Dikran Çuhaciyan in Turkish). It is based on Nikolai Gogol's The Government Inspector. Although the first Turkish-language opera is often regarded as the same composer's Leblebici Horhor (Horhor the Chickpea Seller) of 1875, since this latter opera became wildly popular, Arif'in Hilesi is earlier. It was performed in Gedikpaşa Theatre by Çuhaciyan's Operet Kumpanyası.

== Sources ==
- Sarkisyan, Svetlana (2001). "Chukhajian, Tigran Gevorki". Grove Music Online. Oxford University Press. doi:10.1093/gmo/9781561592630.article.05728.(subscription required)
