= Taşbebek =

1934 Turkish opera

Taşbebek (The Doll) is a 1934 Turkish-language opera by Ahmed Adnan Saygun. It was one of a group of operas commissioned by Atatürk as part of his cultural transformation.

== History ==
It is one of the first Turkish operas staged in Turkey. Being composed in 1934, for the first time it was staged in the Ankara Halkevi stage in the presence of President of Turkey, Mustafa Atatürk on the night of December 27, 1934.
