= Nursel Duruel =

Turkish journalist and author (born 1941)

Nursel Duruel (born 1941) is a Turkish journalist and author. She is a recipient of the Sait Faik Hikâye Armağanı literature prize.

== Biography ==
Duruel was born in Şarki Karaağaç, Kütahya Province, Turkey, 1941. She graduated from Istanbul Girls ' High School and Istanbul University, Faculty of Letters, Department of Archeology.

In 1961, she began her career as a broadcast journalist. Four years later, she took part in the first production team of Turkish Radio and Television Corporation (TRT) where she prepared radio programs in various fields, especially literature and art. Duruel has worked as a copywriter, television writer, encyclopedia writer, and assistant director of Bayrak (BRT Radio).

Her first story appeared in 1979 in Turkish language. Her narrative Geyikler, Annem ve Almanya, which was awarded with Turkish literary prizes in 1981 (Akademi Kitabevi Öykü Ödülü'nü) and 1983 (Sait Faik Hikâye Armağanı), also appeared in German (Die Hirsche, meine Mutter und Deutschland, 1984). She received the 1990 Yunus Nadi Unpublished Short Story Award with her short story "Burgaç" in her book Kaya. Duruel also wrote Cemal Süreya's biography with Feyza Perinçek.

== Awards ==
- 1981, Akademi Kitabevi Öykü Ödülü'nü
- 1983, Sait Faik Hikâye Armağanı literature prize
- 1990, Yunus Nadi Unpublished Short Story Award

== Works ==
- Geyikler, Annem ve Almanya, İstanbul : Can Yayınları, 2006. ISBN 9789750706592
- Yazılı kaya : öykü, İstanbul : Can, 2006. ISBN 9789750706608
- Cumhuriyetin çocukları arkeolojinin büyükleri : Nimet Özgüç, Tahsin Özgüç nkara : Türkiye Bilimer Akademisi, 2011. ISBN 9789944252515
