= Turkish State Theatres =

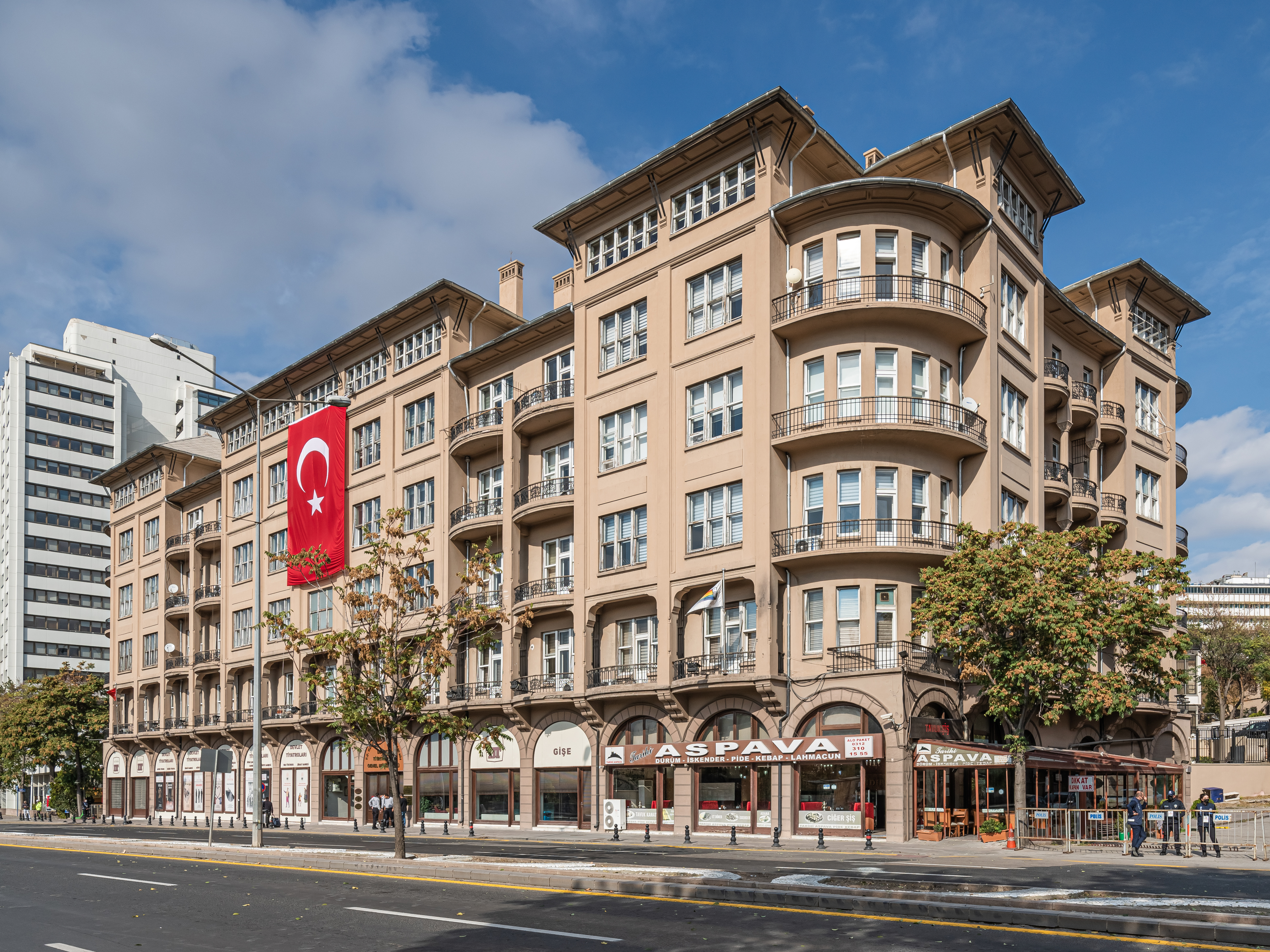
The head office of Turkish State Theatres in Ankara. The building also houses the stages of Küçük Tiyatro and Oda Tiyatrosu.

The Turkish State Theatres (Turkish: Devlet Tiyatroları – DT) is the official directorate of the national theatre companies in Turkey. It is bound to the Ministry of Culture and Tourism and financed by the state to promote performed arts and enhance the public interest they receive. As of 2007, the directorate employs around 2,200 people including more than 700 actors and about the same number of stage technicians.

== Venues ==
The directorate operates more than 52 theatres in 19 different cities (Ankara, Istanbul, İzmir, Bursa, Adana, Antalya, Trabzon, Konya, Kayseri, Sivas, Diyarbakır, Van, Erzurum, Gaziantep, Malatya, Elazığ, Samsun, Çorum, Zonguldak and Kahramanmaraş), staging about 120 productions in its venues and reaching an audience of about 1.5 million each theatre season as well as organizing national tours.

== See also ==
- Turkish State Opera and Ballet
