= Mersin Archaeological Museum =

Archaeological museum

- Mersin Arkeoloji Müzesi
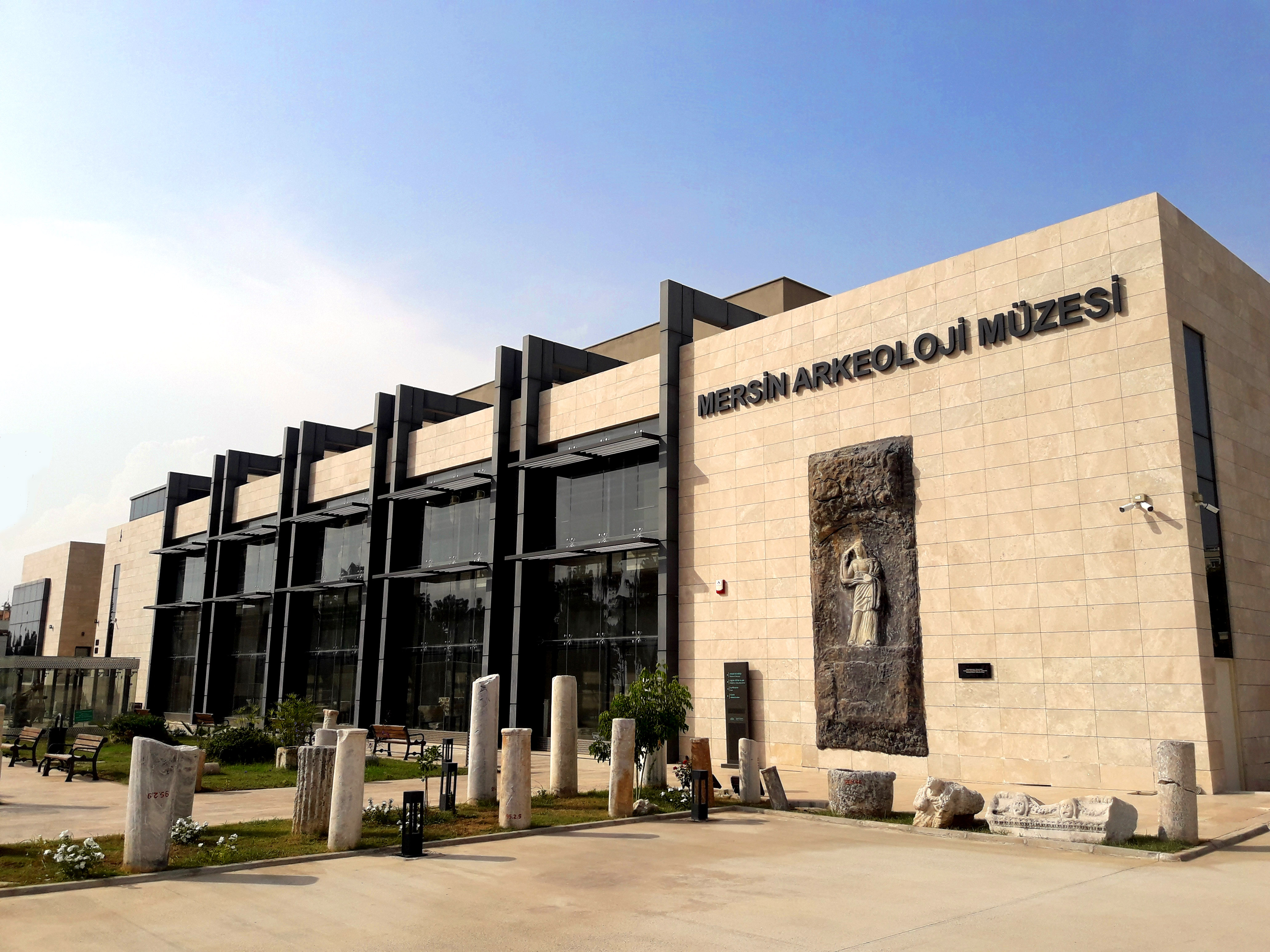
- Mersin Archaeological Museum

- Mersin Archaeology Museum
- Established: 2017; 9 years ago
- Location: Adnan Menderes Boulevard No.54, Yenişehir, Mersin Turkey
- Coordinates: 36°46′53″N 34°36′05″E
- Type: Archaeology, Ethnography
- Collections: Deep history, Hellenistic period, Roman Empire, Byzantine Empire, Ottoman Empire
- Owner: Ministry of Culture and Tourism
- Website: Mersin Archaeological Museum

Mersin Archaeological Museum is a museum in Mersin, Turkey

== Location ==
The museum is at 36°46′53″N 34°36′05″E to the east of Mersin Naval Museum, to the south of Muğdat Mosque and to the north of Adnan Menderes Boulevard. Its total land area, including the yard is 7,470 square metres (80,400 sq ft). It is a two storey building. In addition to exhibit halls there is a library, a conference room, a children's play room and a market in the museum.

== History ==
Mersin Province has many ancient sites. Yumuktepe and Soli in Mersin city and Gözlükule in Tarsus are among these. But prior to the foundation Mersin Museum, the findings were exhibited in other museums. Mersin Museum was founded in 1978. Its former location was in Mersin Halkevi Building. However the exhibition hall of the former museum building was insufficient for the Mersin-area-archaeological items and the new building was constructed. It was opened on 18 May 2017.

== Exhibits ==
The visitors enter a time tunnel, in which various stages in Paleolithic, Neolithic, Chalcolithic, the Bronze Age and Iron Age are displayed in chronological order. Then there are replicas (diorama) of Neolithic dwellings, ancient olive presses and a pool of amphoras. In the upper floor, findings from Yumuktepe, Soli, Elaiussa Sebaste and many other places are exhibited. Some items are exhibited in showcases. There is also a Hellenistic inscription from Bozyazı, i.e., ancient Nagidos and various statues as well as column headings. In ethnography section, exhibits about later-era-Yörüks (nomadic Turkmens) and the replica of a hug, a primitive dwelling found close to Yumuktepe are exhibited. The total number of exhibits is 1435.

== Gallery ==
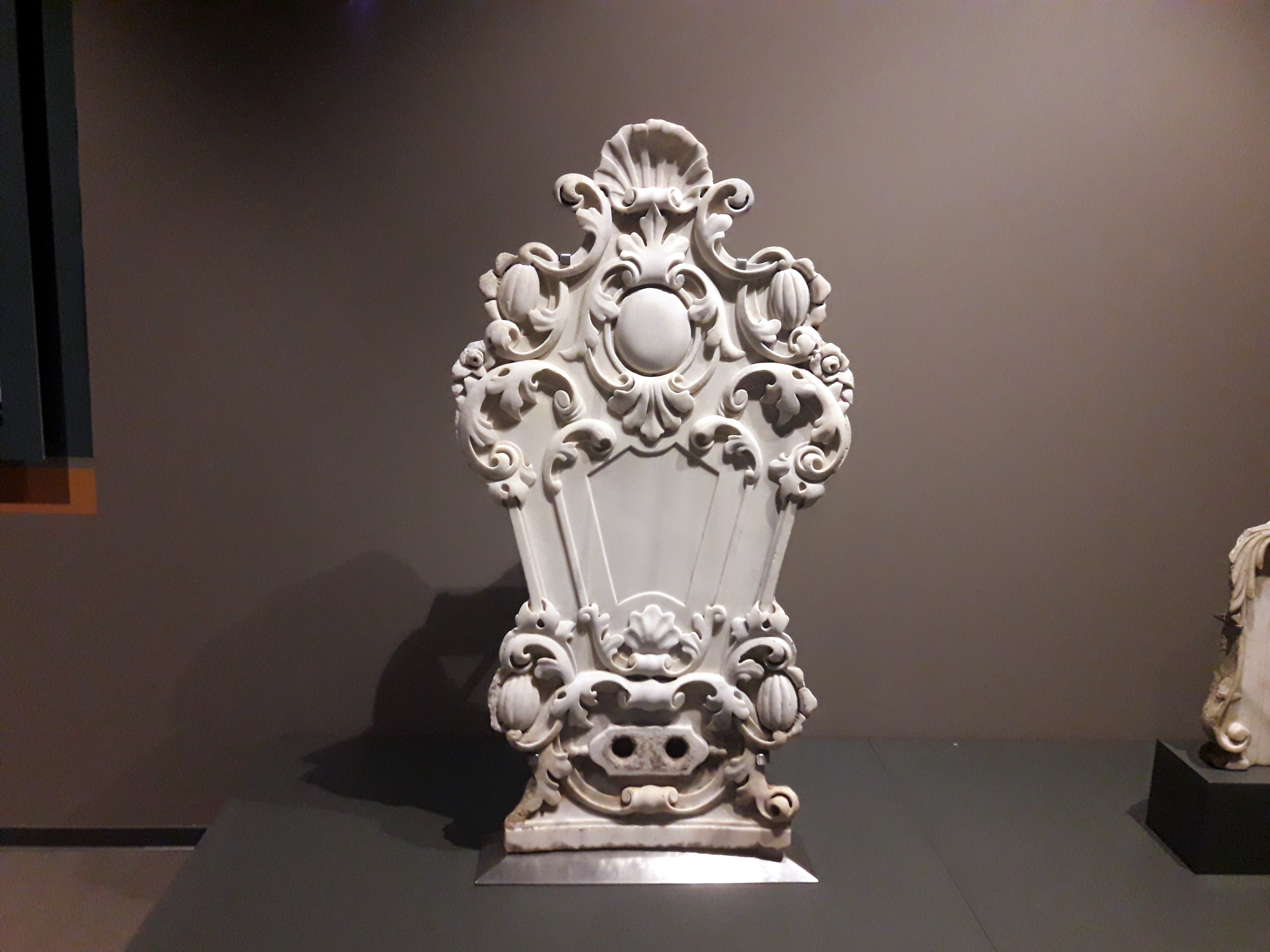
Ottoman tombstone

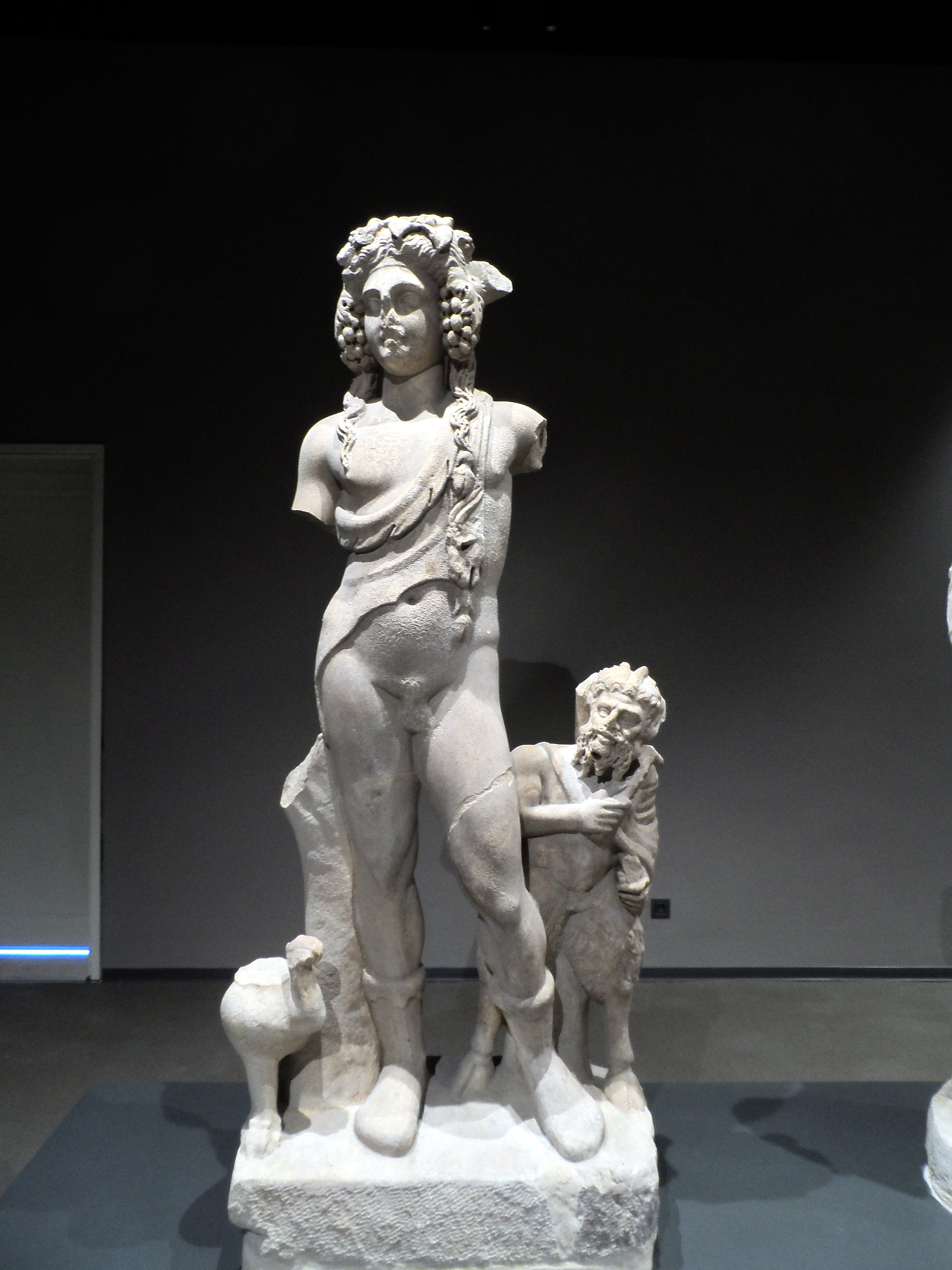
Hellenitic sculpture (Dionysos-Pan-Panther)

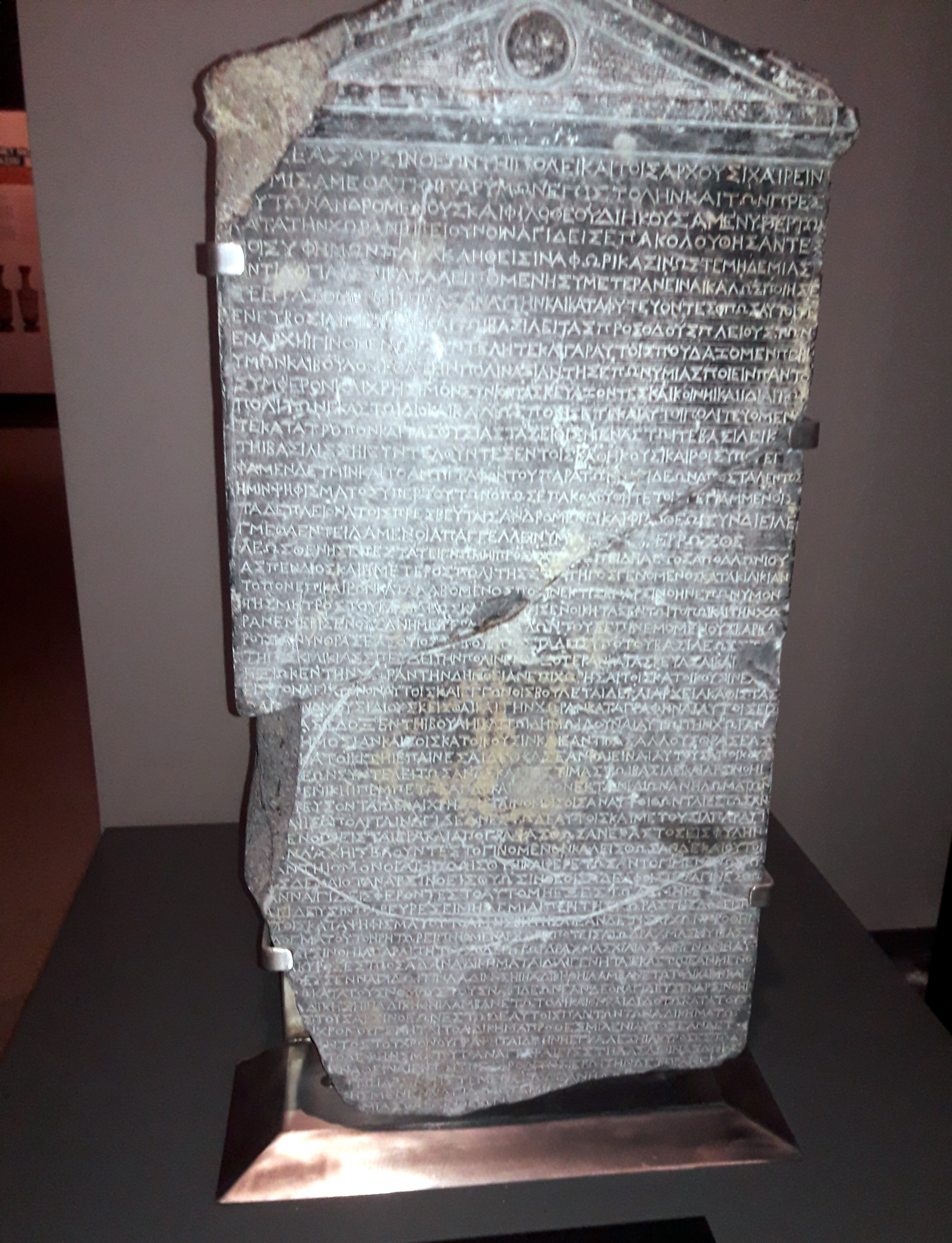
Nagidos inscription

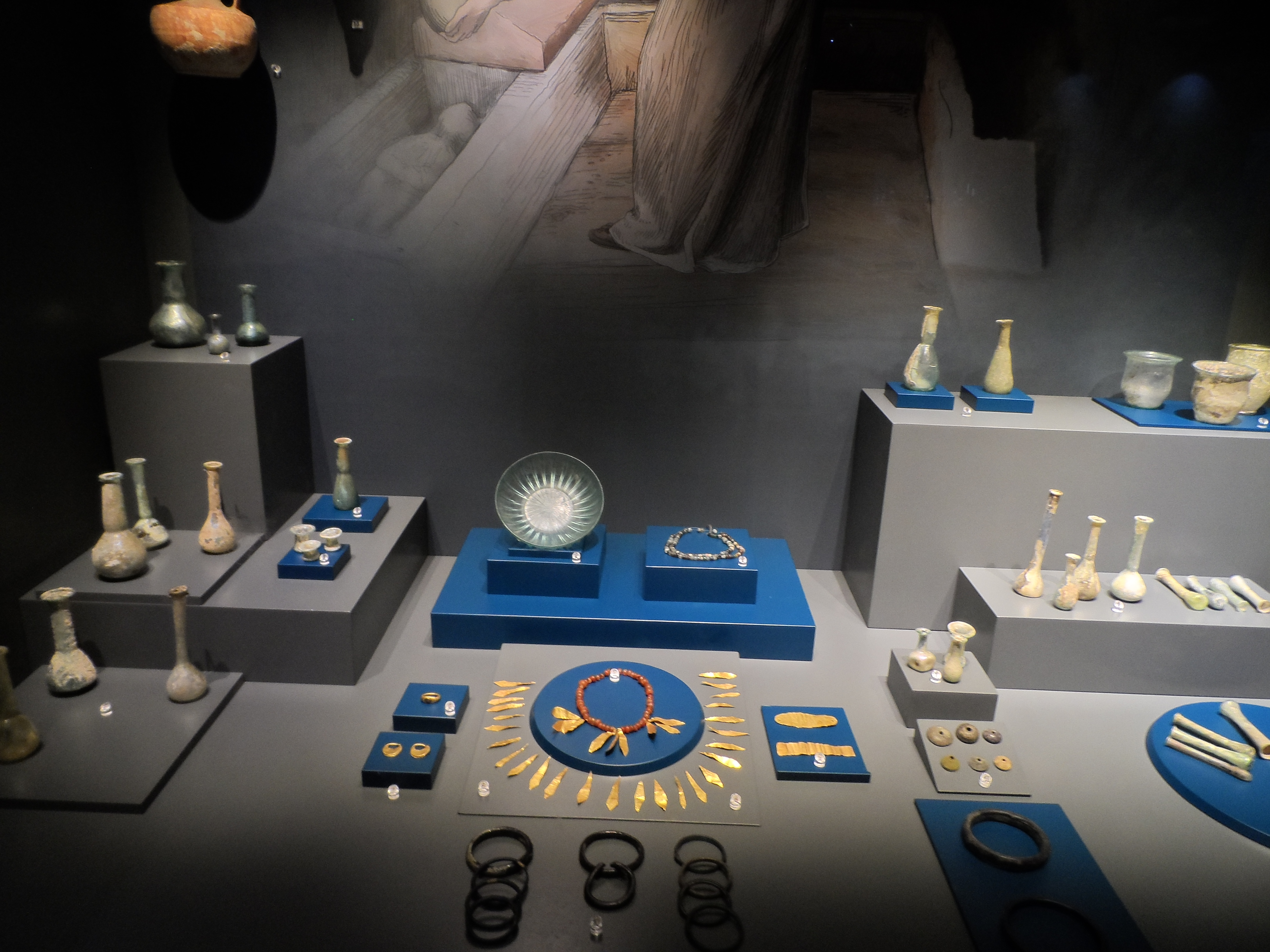
Mersin findings
