= Mersin Museum =

Former museum in Mersin, Turkey

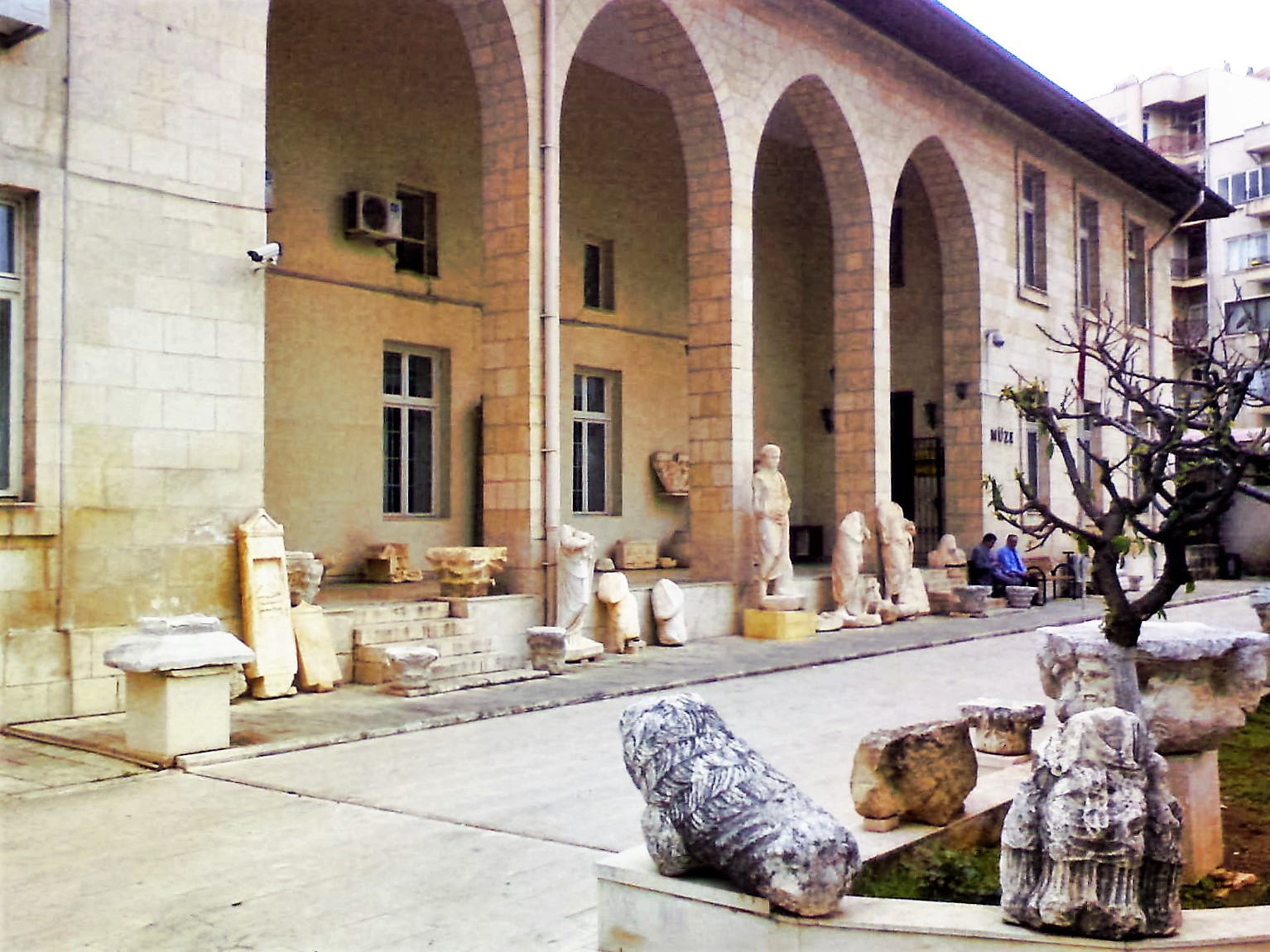

- Location of Mersin Museum in Turkey
- Established: 1978
- Location: Atatürk Caddesi Kültür Merkezi, Mersin Halkevi, Mersin, Turkey
- Coordinates: 36.8063°N 34.6203°E
- Type: Archaeology, ethnography
- Director: Songül Ceylan Bala
- Website: www.mersin.web.tr

Mersin Museum is the main museum of Mersin, Turkey. It is operated by the Ministry of Culture and Tourism. However after establishing a new museum, i.e., Mersin Archaeological Museum most of the exhibits were moved to the new museum.

== History ==
Mersin Province has many ancient sites. Yumuktepe and Soli in Mersin city and Gözlükule in Tarsus are among these. But prior to the foundation Mersin Museum, the findings were exhibited in other museums. Mersin Museum was founded in 1978. After 1991 the museum was located in the present site, the eastern wing of Mersin Halkevi.

== The exhibition ==
The stone findings such as pithoses and steles are exhibited in the yard. The museum has two floors. In the ground floor there are two exhibition halls. In the first hall, stelae and amphorae of the Roman period are exhibited. The terracota tombs are from Soli. Various pottery and handicrafts as well as metal ormanets of the Neolithic, Chalcolithic and Early Bronze Age are displayed in the second hall. Most of these are the findings in Yumuktepe and Gözlükule sites. The third hall on the upper floor is reserved for the ethnographic items of Turkmen culture such as ornamental items, carpets, clothes, prayer rosaries, wooden and copper artifacts, weapons etc. In addition to 446 items there are also 999 coins.

== Gallery ==
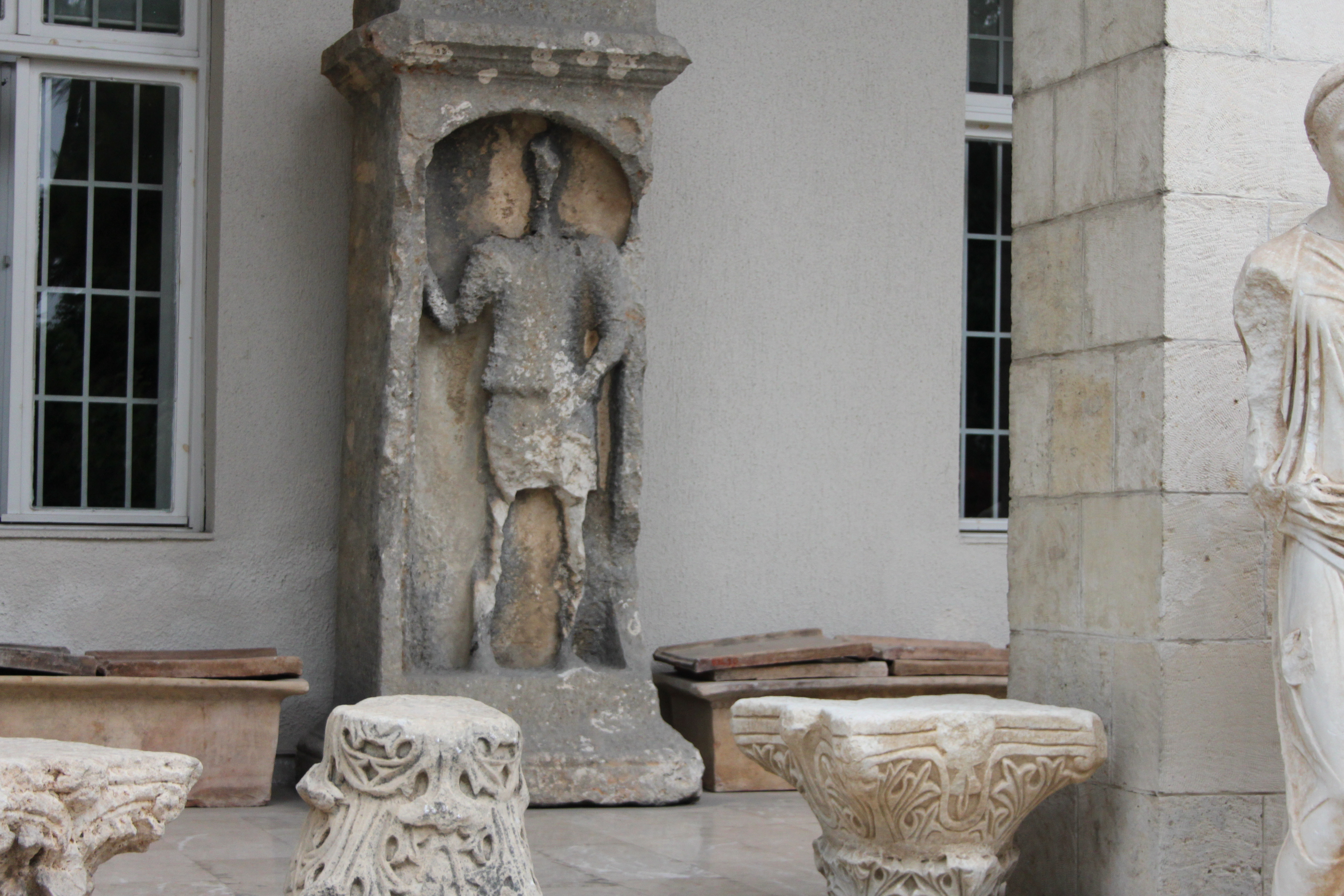
Stela and column capitals

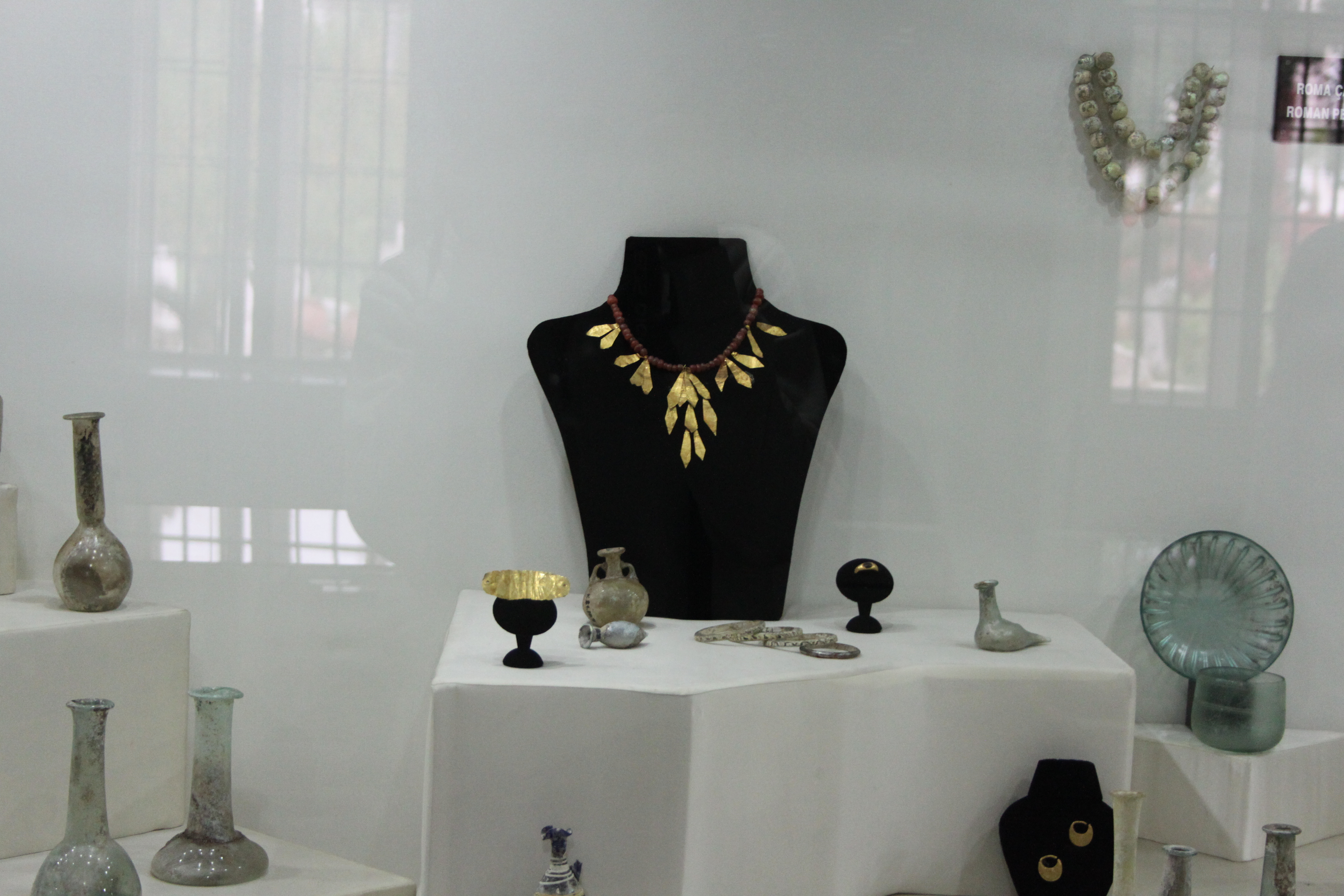
Golden decorations

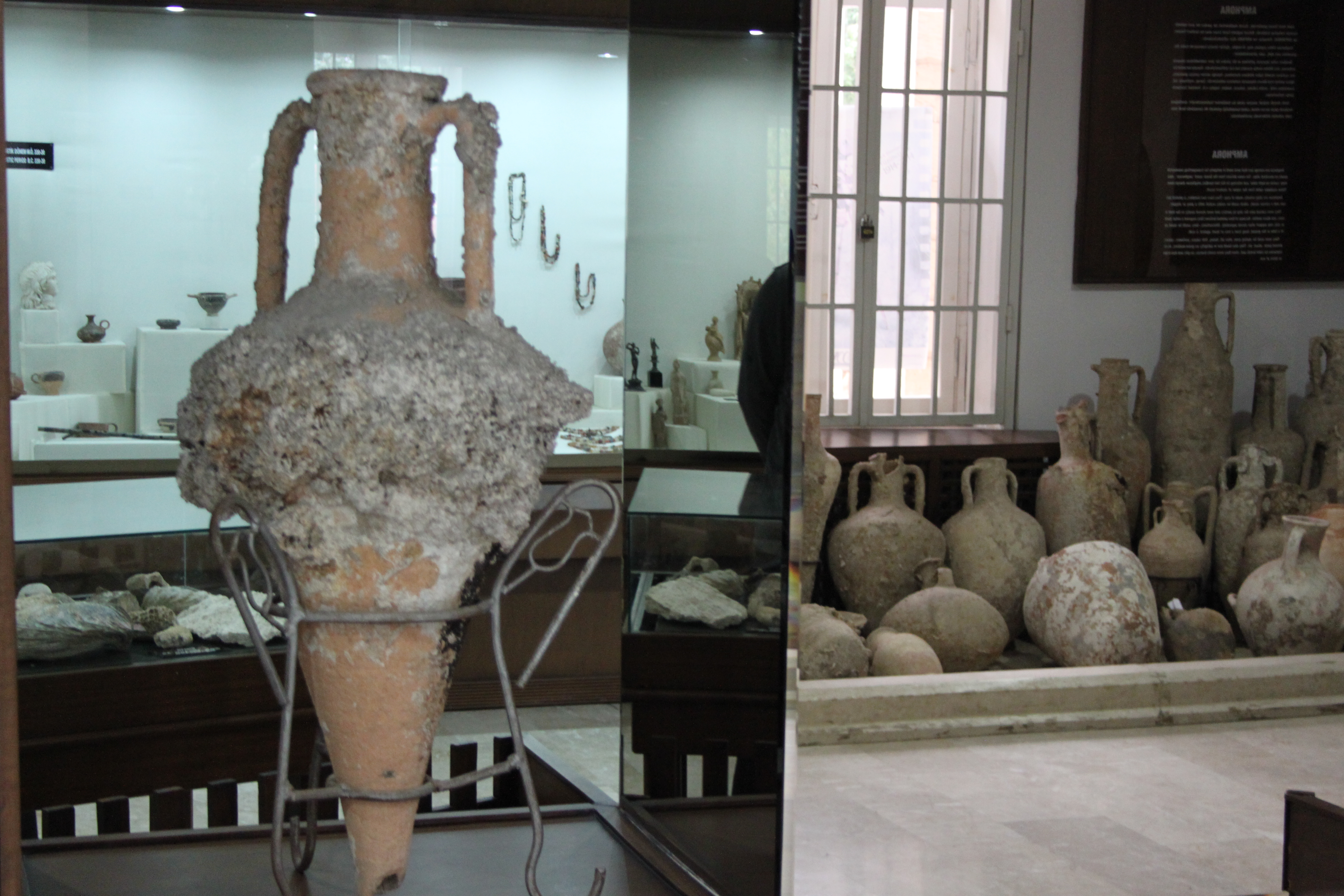
Pithoses, jars and other vessels

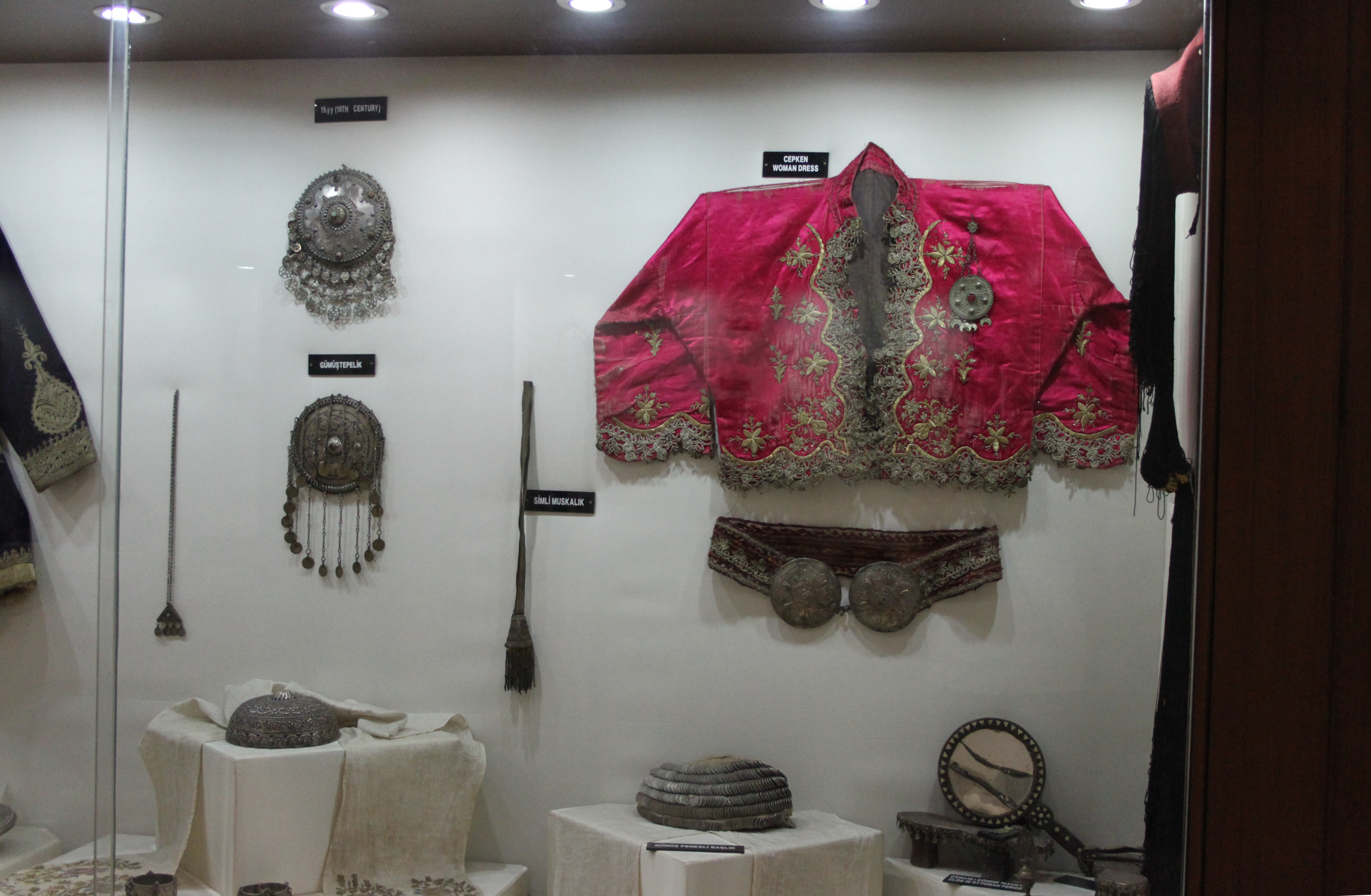
Coat, belt buckles and decorations

== See also ==
- Atatürk Museum, Mersin
