= İçel Sanat Kulübü =

Art club in Mersin, Turkey

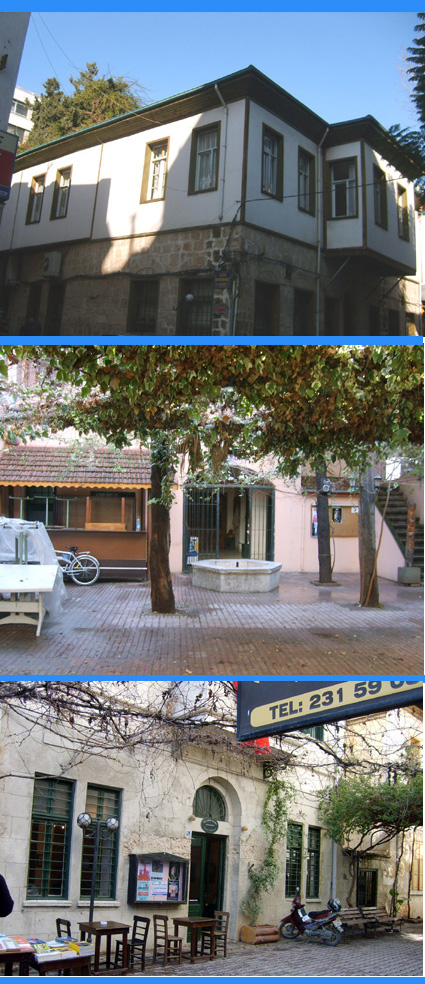
- Top: Müfide İlhan-Ayşe Uğural Gallery. Middle: Clubhouse. Bottom: Teoman Ünüsan Gallery
- Legal status: NGO
- Purpose: Art and outdoor recreation
- Location: Sanat Sokağı, Mersin
- Region served: Mersin Province, Turkey
- Official language: Turkish
- Leader: Mecit Baskın (2020)
- Website: www.icelsanatkulubu.com

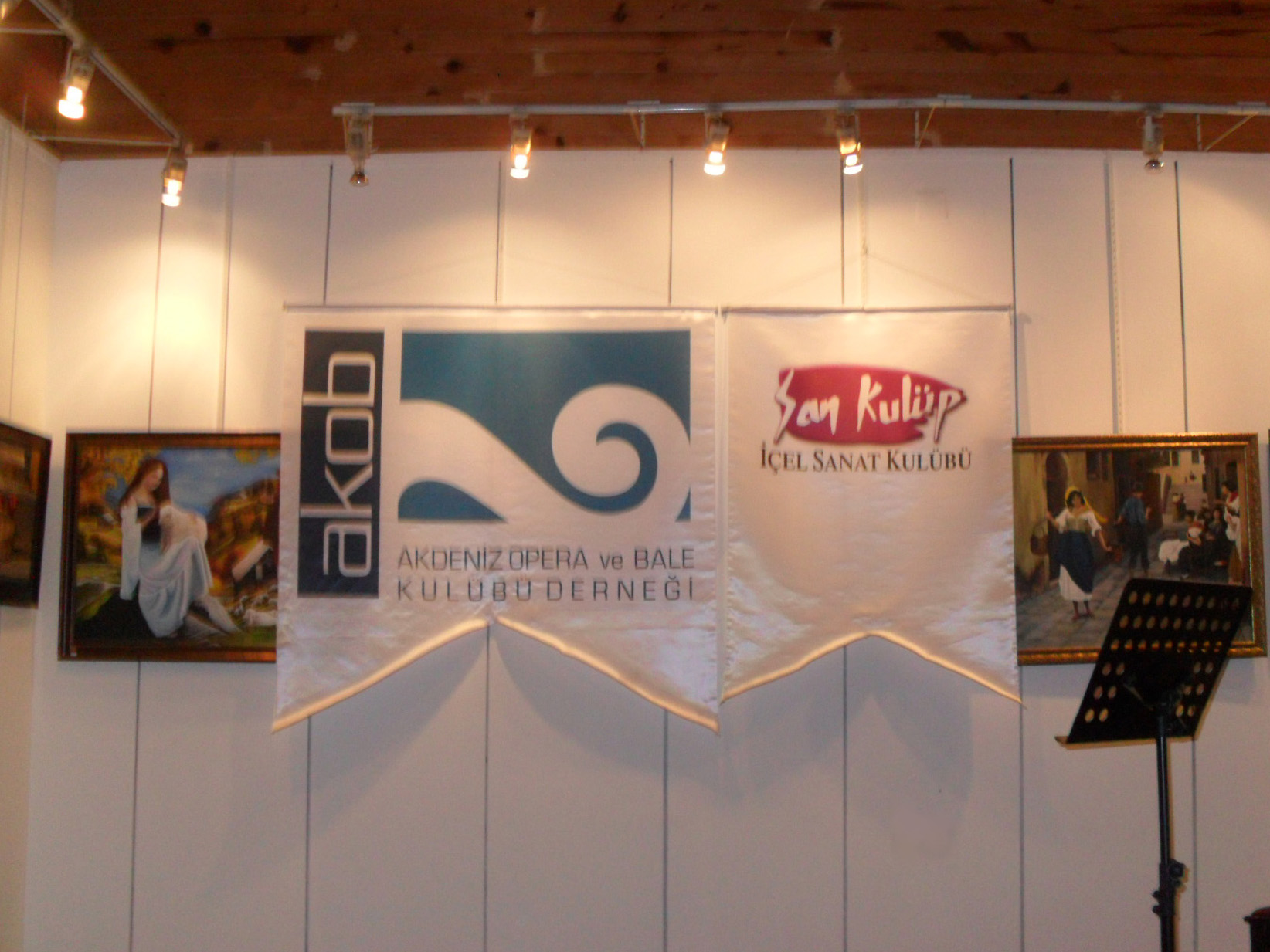
AKOB and ISK logos in a joint Project in Mersin

Art Club of İçel (Turkish: İçel Sanat Kulübü) is a nonprofit cultural organization in Mersin, Turkey. İçel is the former name of Mersin Province. Founded in 1989, the club plays an important role in the cultural life of Mersin.

== Activities ==
- Each year, the club hosts conferences by celebrated academicians from various universities and literary circles of Turkey. It also hosts series of conferences on specific topics such as archaeology, mythology, philosophy etc. in collaboration with universities such as University of Mersin, University of İstanbul and University of Lecce, Italy.
- Two art galleries of the club serve supporting artists, sculptors and photographers.
- Frequently, concerts and poem performances are held in the main hall. Especially in summertime, some concerts are held in scenic rural areas around Mersin.
- The members are informed about all kinds of cultural activities in Mersin via cell phones and internet.
- Various art courses are offered to enthusiast amateurs including members and nonmembers of the club alike.
- The club participates in annual Music festival of Mersin.

== Outdoor recreation ==
The club organises weekend hikes, and in some cases backpacking. Non members are also invited. The track and the level of hiking difficulty is announced in advance by the group leaders. The groups are transported to an appropriate starting point, where they start hiking. The average hiking time is about seven or eight hours, excluding lunch time.

During hiking, the hikers enjoy picturesque Mediterranean scenery and sometimes explore archaeological wealth that is quite widespread around Mersin. In past several times, the hikers informed the academic authorities about their findings like caves, ruins etc. Some antiques had been found during hikes and bestowed to Mersin Museum.

== Media and international relations ==
The club publishes a monthly magazine. The essays are usually written by club members, and organized by the editorial board of the club. The emphasis is on the club activities, historical anecdotes about Mersin, examples of poetry and sometimes drawings.

The club has an internet website, at which all club activities are published. The club also distributes free e-mail addresses to members with club domain name.

The club sometimes participates in mutual projects with the art lovers of German city of Neustadt an der Weinstrasse, which is a partner city of Yenişehir, a municipality of Mersin.

== Service buildings ==
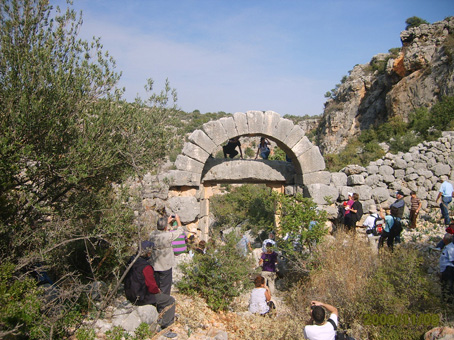
Hiking in Corasion, 70 km (43 mi) west of Mersin.

The club uses three old Mersin houses in the downtown that are aged more than a century and are situated is Sanat Sokağı (English: Art Street). The street is a pedestrian zone and hosts street performances, handicraft displays and painting exhibitions.

The Yellow House

The 100 seat conference hall in the ground floor is named after Prof. Nevit Kodallı, a well-known classical music composer, who was a citizen of Mersin. Minor concerts are also held in this hall. The top floor on the other hand is reserved for drama and music courses.

The Green House

The art gallery in the ground floor is named after Teoman Ünüsan, a former governor of Mersin. The administrative branches as well as the 3,000 book library is in the top floor.

The Clubhouse

The restaurant at the ground floor has a garden with century-old trees is quite attractive during summertime. The top floor is reserved for various activities. The small art gallery is named after Ayşe Uğural and Müfide İlhan. Müfide İlhan, a former mayor of Mersin, was Turkey's very first female mayor (in 1950-1951). At this floor, there are also rooms reserved for mountaineering, art courses, photography and folklore.

== See also ==
- Mediterranean Opera and Ballet Club
