= Mersin Atatürk Museum =

Atatürk Museum, Mersin
- Mersin Atatürk Evi Müzesi
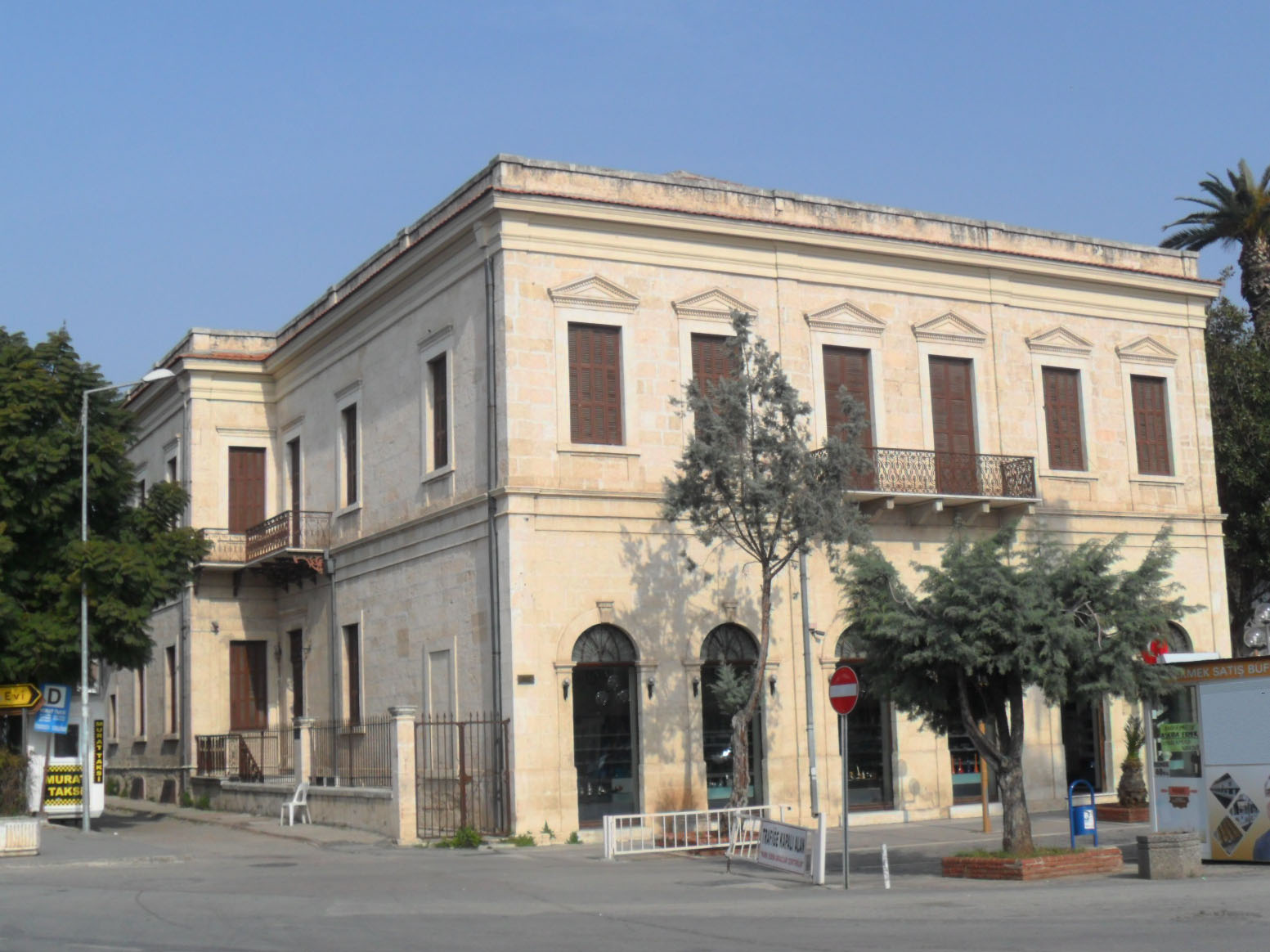
- Mersin Atatürk Museum

- Location of Atatürk Museum in Turkey
- Established: October 12, 1992
- Location: Mersin, Turkey
- Coordinates: 36.8063°N 34.6203°E
- Type: House museum
- Website: www.mersin-ataturk-evi-muzesi

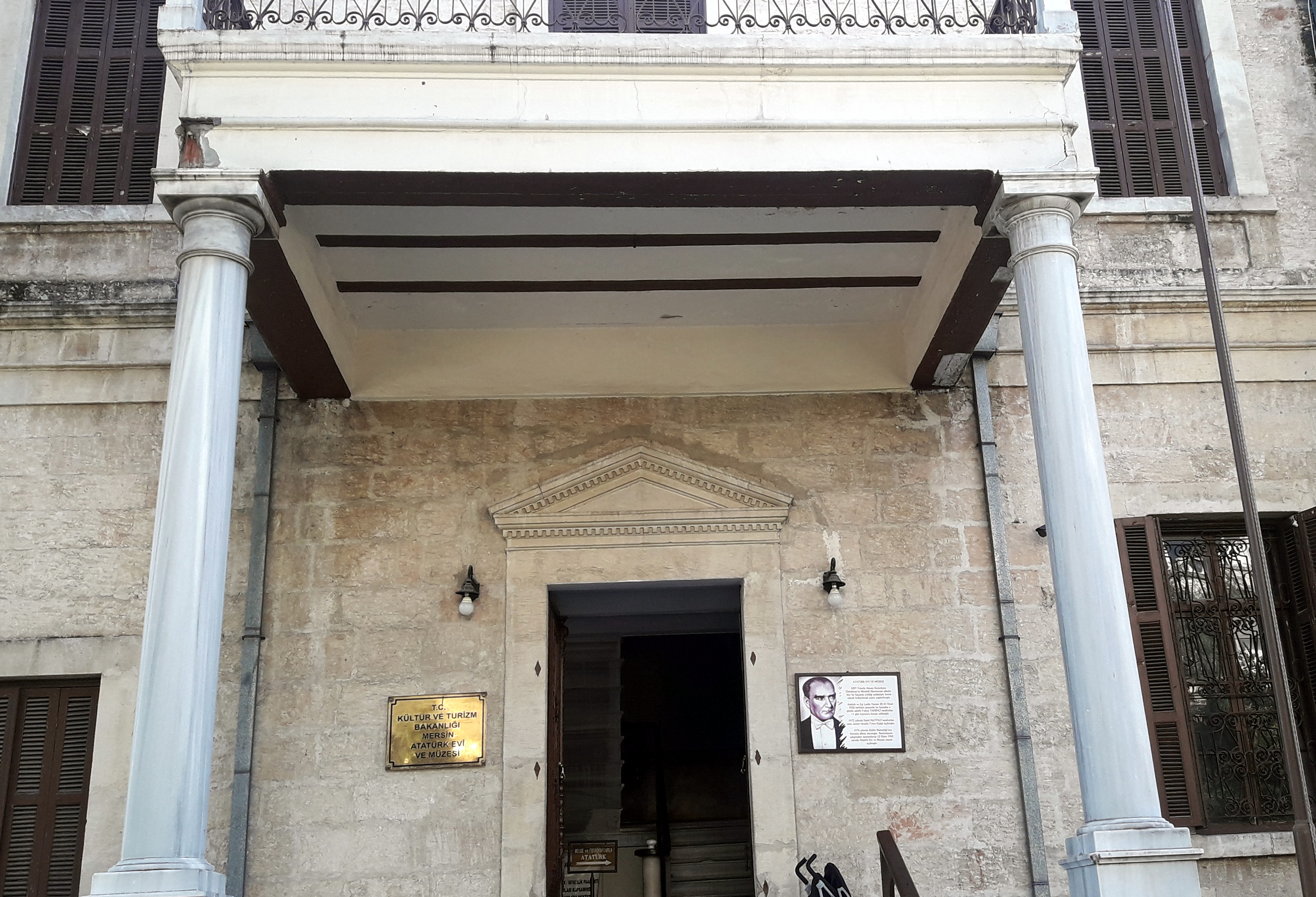

The Atatürk Museum in Mersin (Turkish: Mersin Atatürk Evi Müzesi) is a two-storey house in Mersin, which hosted the founder of modern Turkey, Mustafa Kemal Atatürk and his wife in 1925.

== History ==
The house was originally built in 1897 by H. Christman, the German consul to Mersin when he married a Mersin citizen (of the Mavromati family). It was named Krizman house (Krizman konağı). In 1925, the house was assigned for Atatürk, when he visited Mersin on 20 January with his wife, Latife. They stayed eleven days.

In later years, the building was used by the Fedon Tahinci family and was called Tahinci house. In 1980, it was bought by the government. After restoration, it was transformed to a museum specialized on Atatürk and the Turkish War of Independence. The museum was opened on 12 October 1992.

== Displayed items ==
On the ground floor, there is a photo and document gallery with a small conference room. There are some personal belongings of Atatürk, brought from Ankara. In the upper floor there are seven rooms: two are bedrooms, one room is a study, and the rest are sitting rooms, all decorated with the original furniture.

== Gallery ==
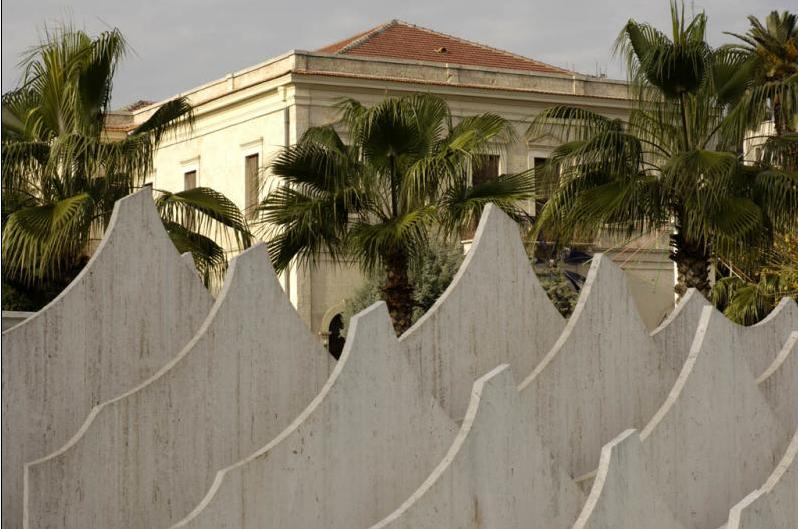
Mersin Atatürk Museum

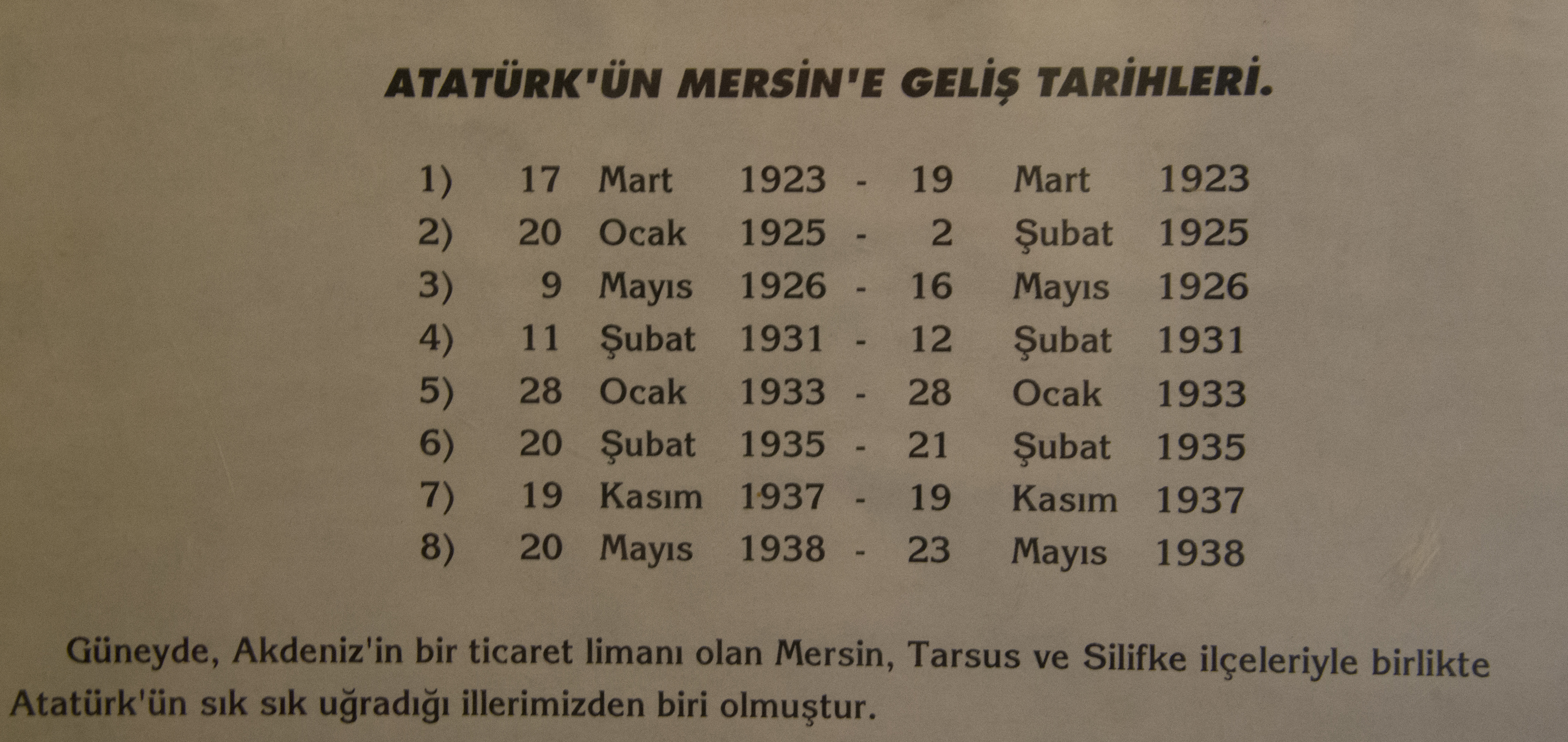
Atatürk's arrival dates in Mersin

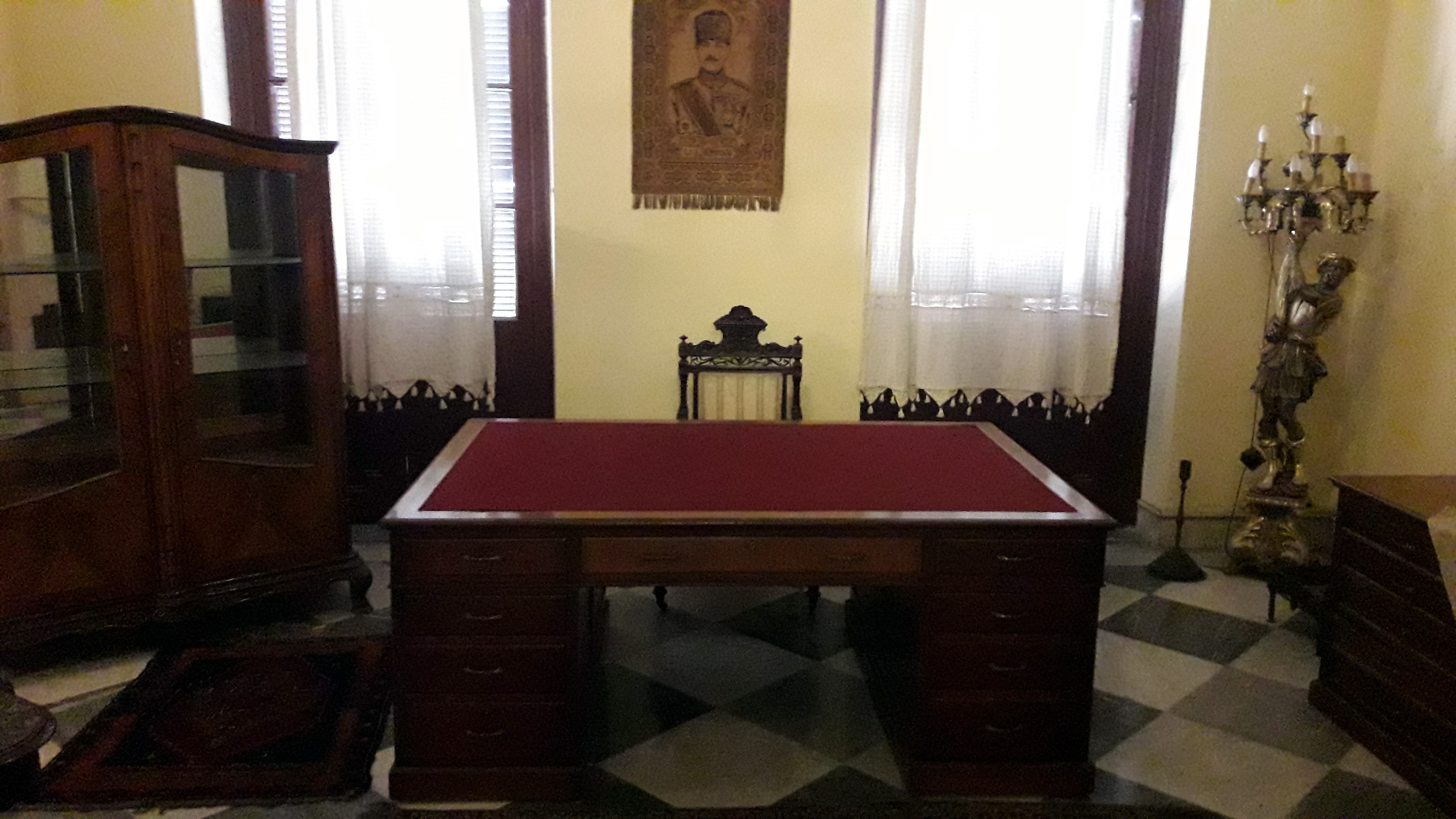
Mersin Atatürk House and Museum study room

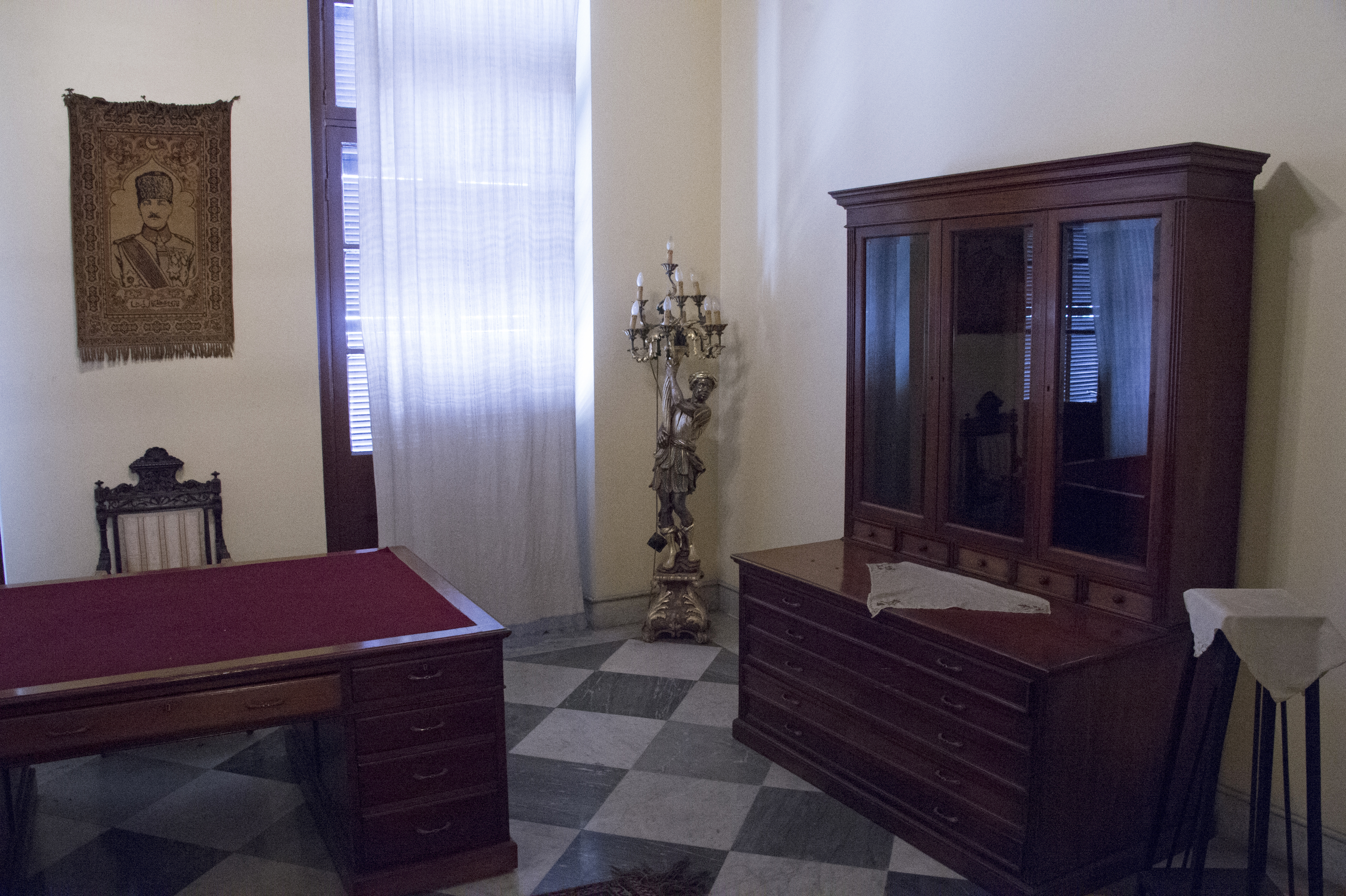
Mersin Atatürk House and Museum study room

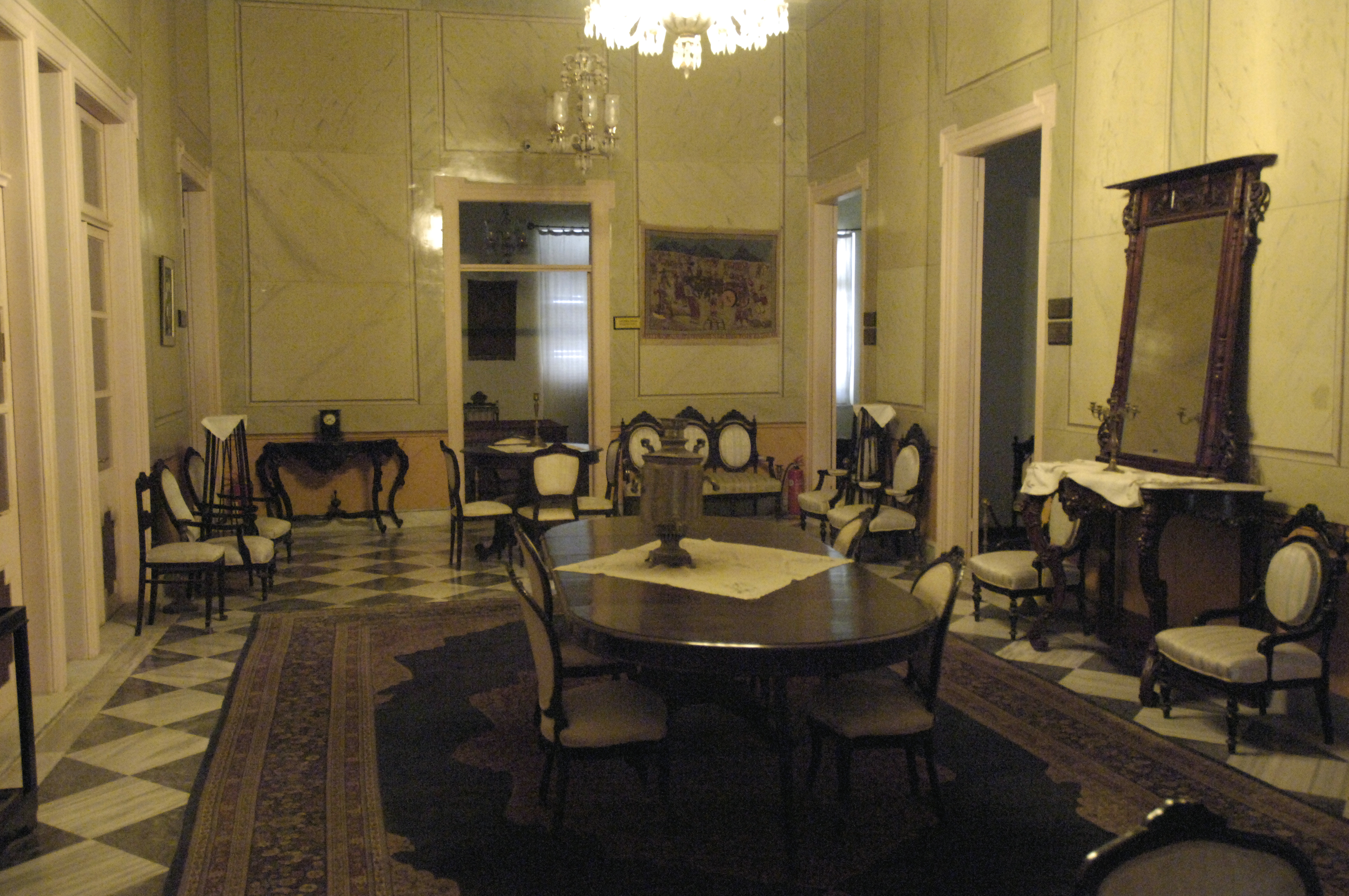
Mersin Atatürk House and Museum upper hall

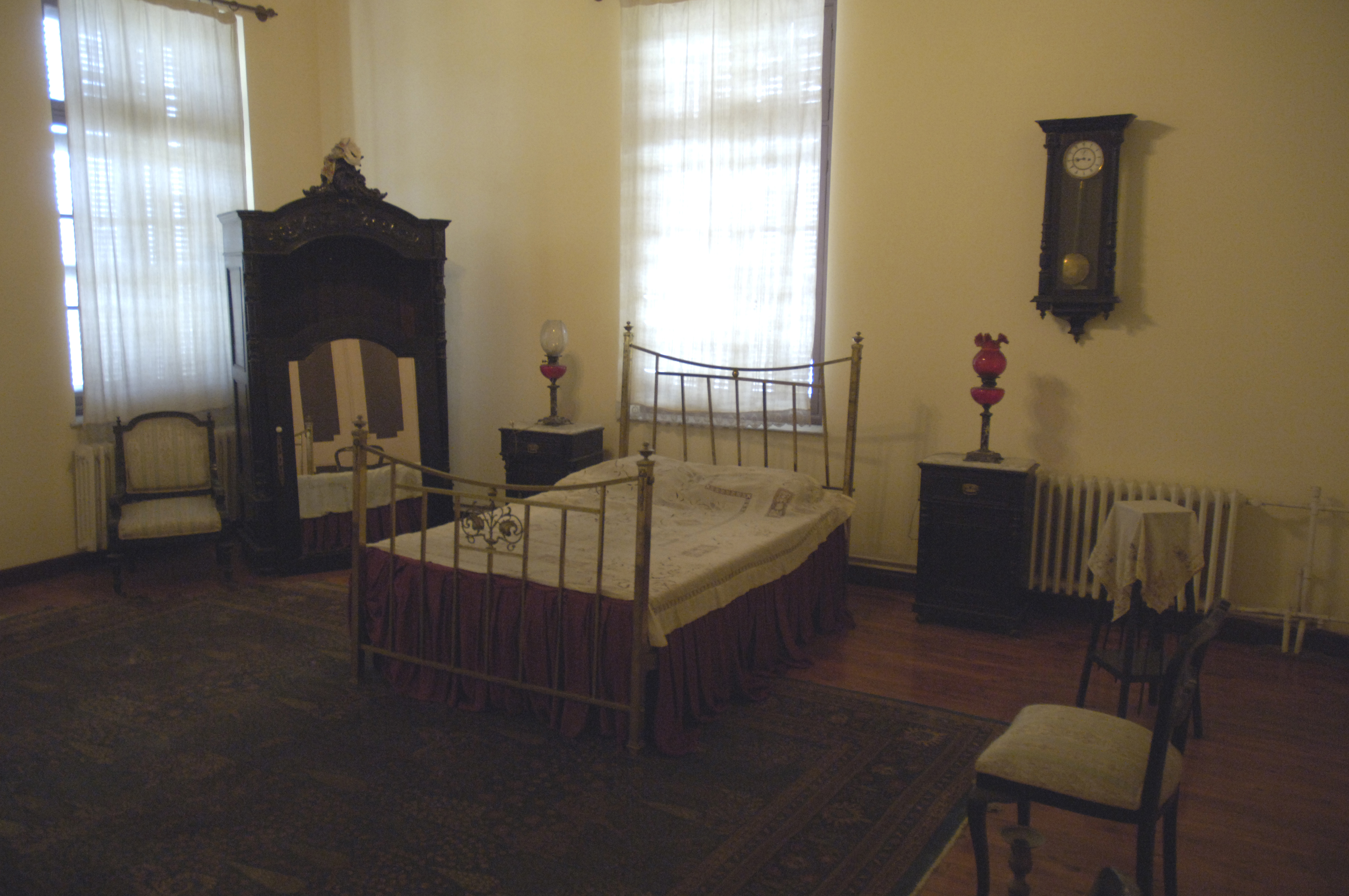
Mersin Ataturk House and Museum bedroom

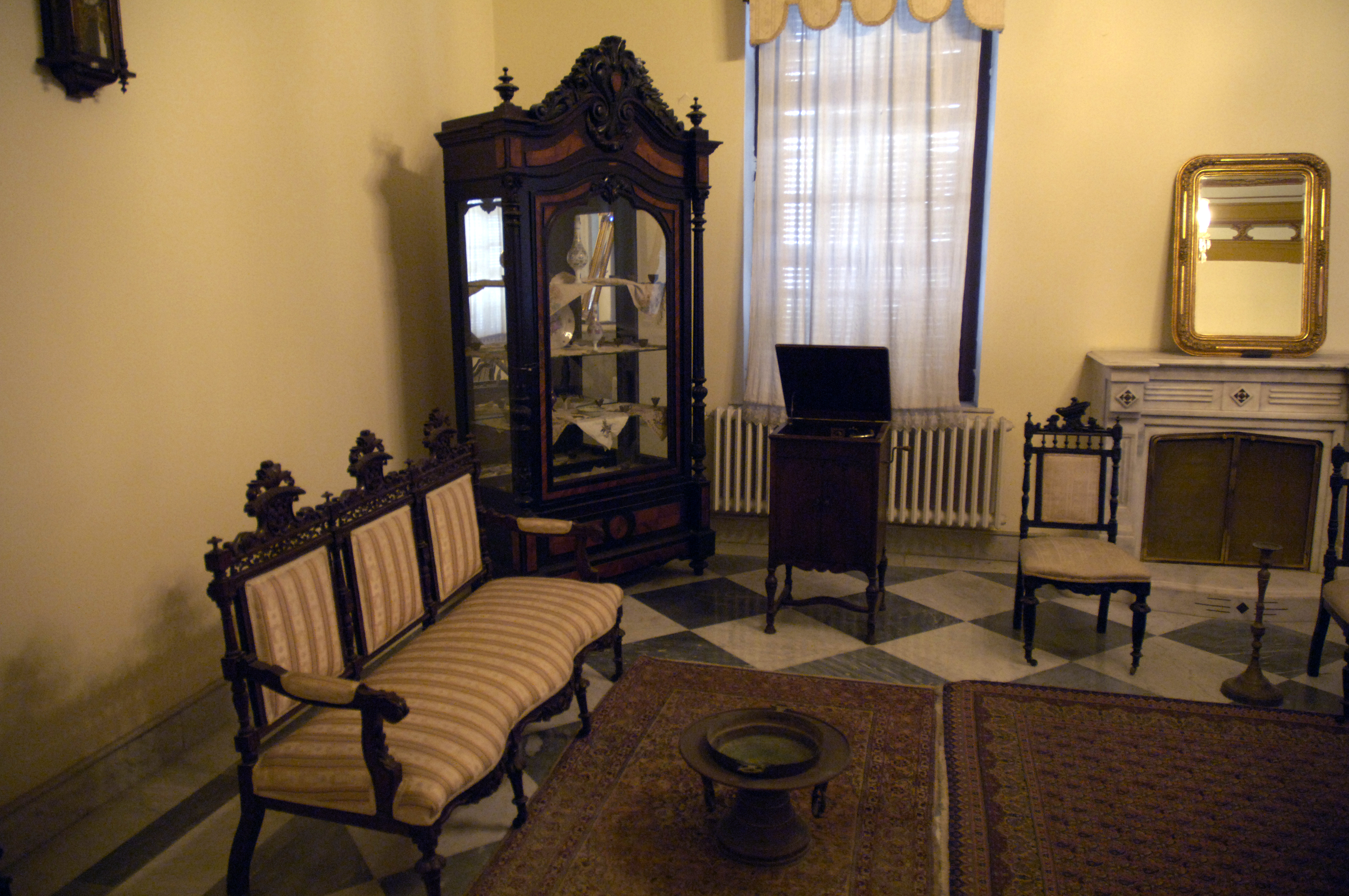
Mersin Ataturk House and Museum guest room

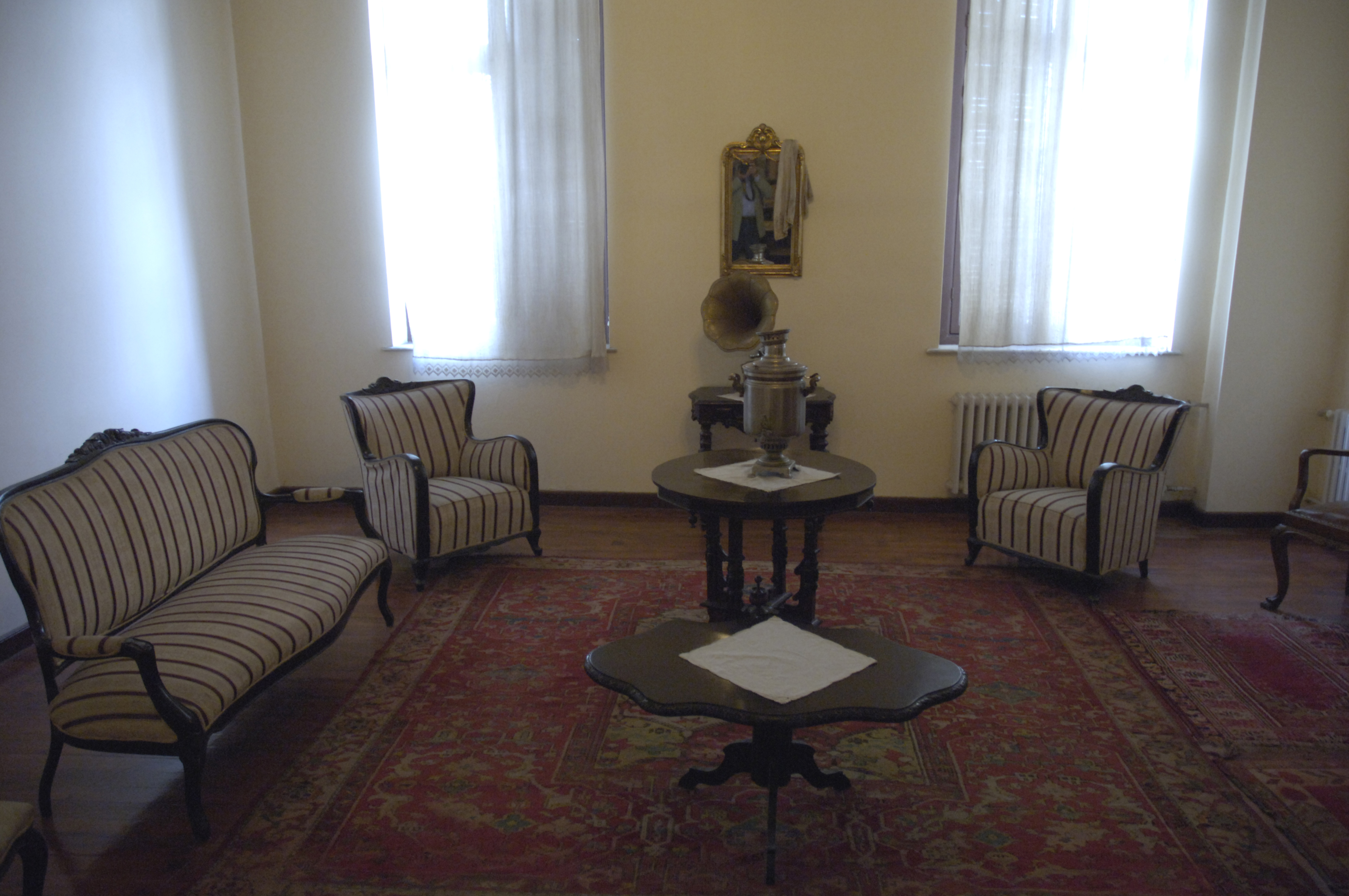
Mersin Ataturk House and Museum guest room

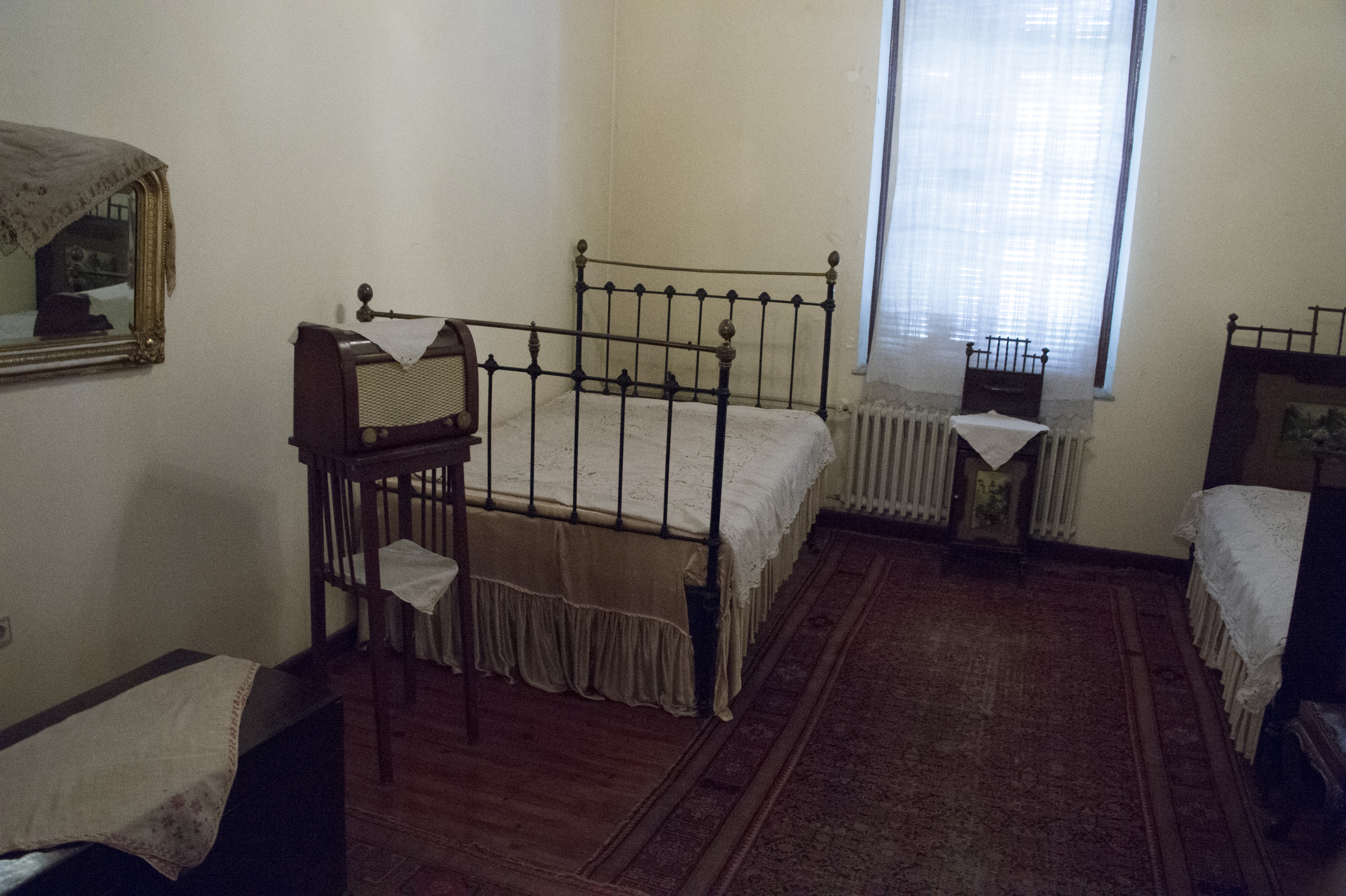
Mersin Atatürk House and Museum guest bedroom

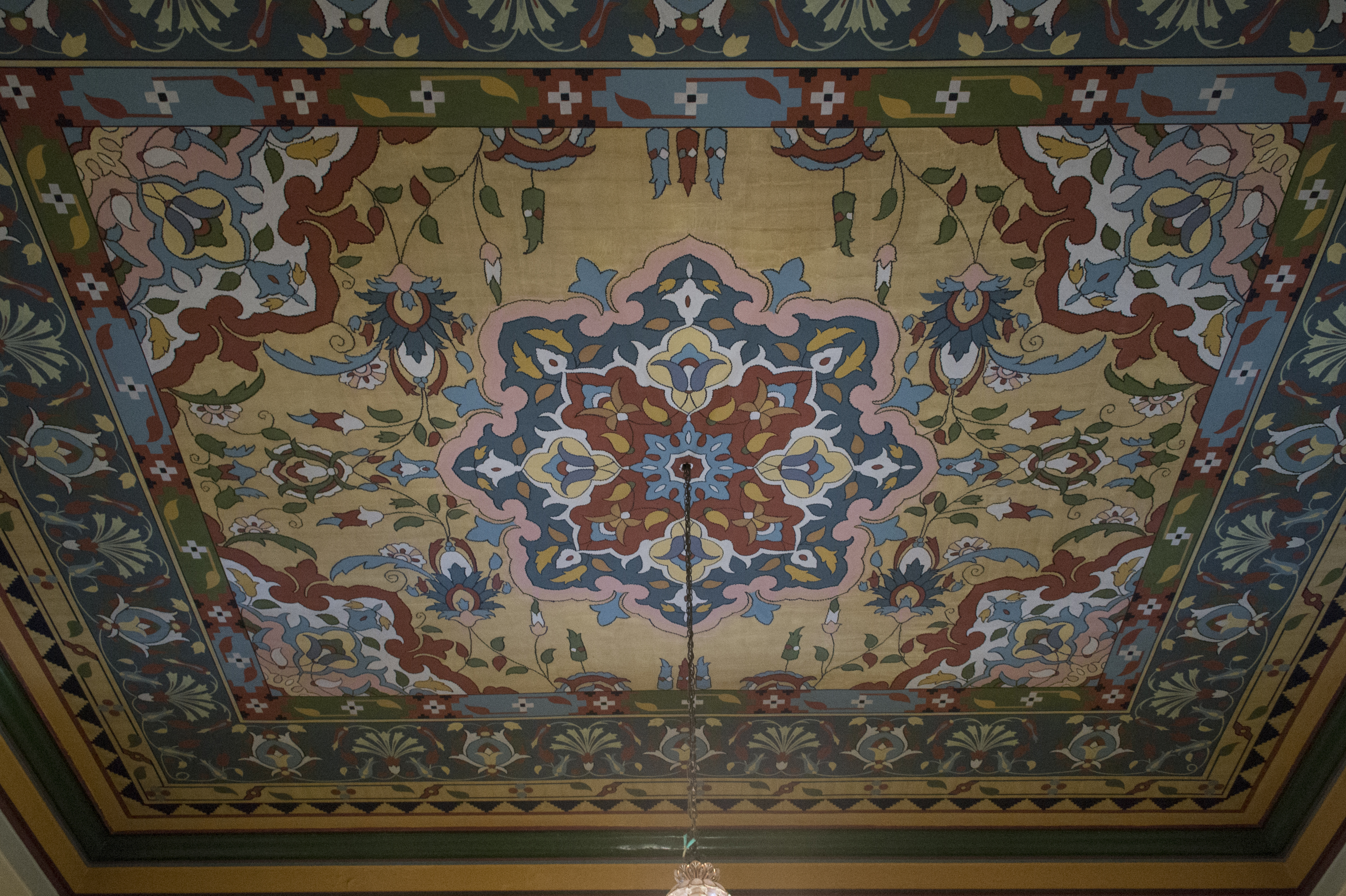
Mersin Atatürk House and Museum ceiling decoration

== See also ==
- Mersin Museum
- Mersin Naval Museum
- Atatürk Museums in Turkey
