= Mersin Halkevi =

Building in Mersin, Turkey

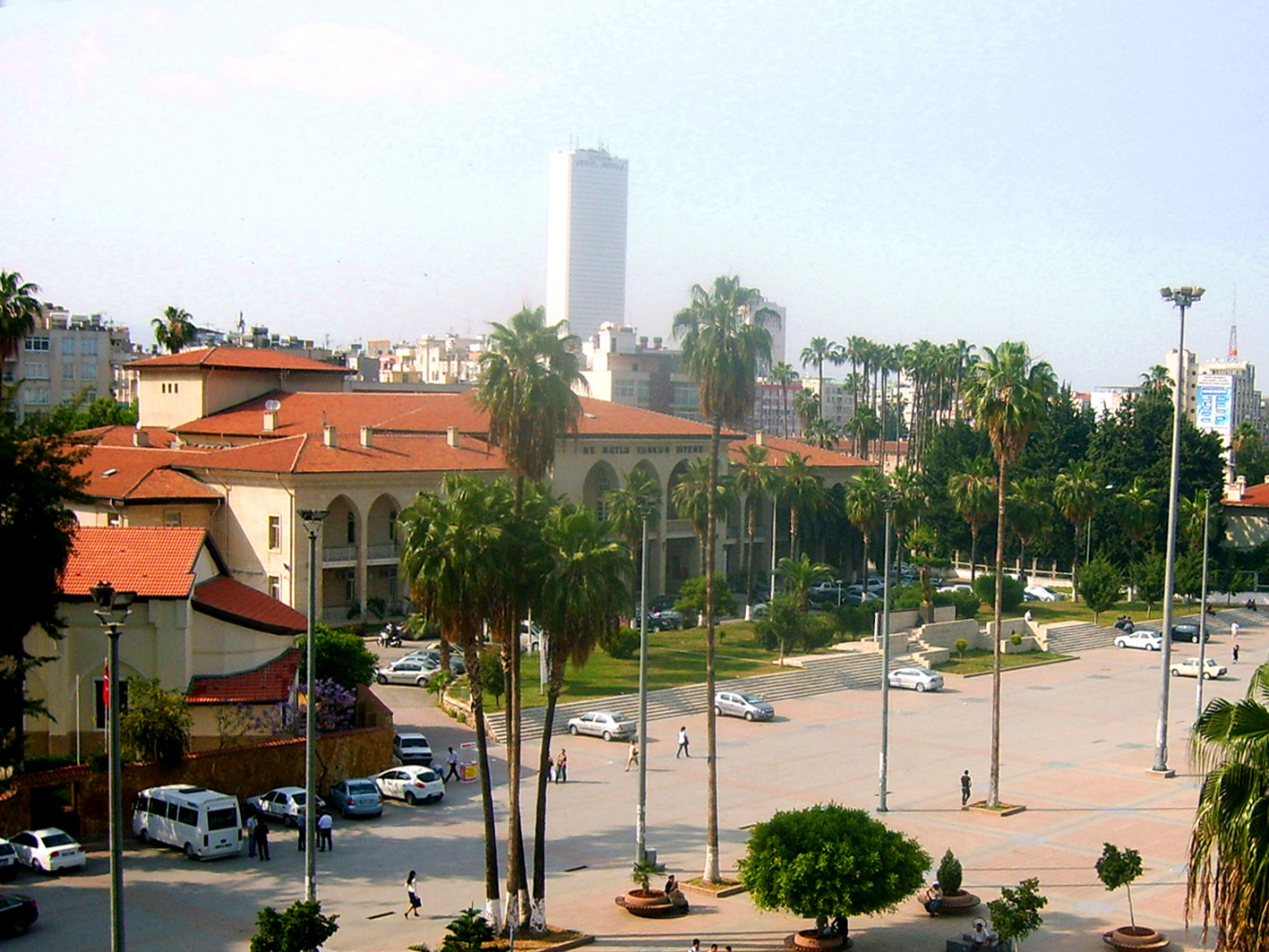
- Mersin Halkevi building seen from southwest

General information
- Location: Mersin, Turkey
- Coordinates: 36°48′N 34°38′E
- Completed: 29 October 1946
- Owner: Ministry of Culture and Tourism

Technical details
- Floor area: 4,800 m^{2} (52,000 sq ft)

Design and construction
- Architect: Ertuğrul Menteşe

Mersin Halkevi is a building in Mersin, Turkey originally built within the scope of the project Halkevleri, but currently used as a cultural center and opera house.

== History ==
Halkevleri was an important enlightenment project in the early years of the Turkish Republic. The Mersin branch of Halkevleri was opened on 24 February 1933. The building of Halkevi was planned to meet the demands of the project as a theatre, a concert hall, classrooms, workshops etc. It was designed by architect Ertuğrul Menteşe with the consultants Arif Hikmet Koyunoğlu, Dr. Mukbil Gökdoğan and Raşit Tuğrul. The building was constructed between February 1944 and November 1946.

It went into service on 29 October 1946, the 23rd anniversary of the proclamation of the Republic. Two months later, Mersin residents were able to watch Giacomo Puccini's Madame Butterfly, put on stage by the guest artists from Ankara Opera. The building with a floor area of 4,800 m^{2} (52,000 sq ft) was the biggest building of the Halkevleri Project. The total expenditure was around 1.12 million Turkish liras. After the Halkevleri Project was terminated by the government on 8 August 1951, a western wing of the building was used as a movie theatre and the rest was used as a library and vocational school for girls. The building temporarily housed the Mersin Archaeological Museum before the museum building was constructed. On 4 January 1977, the building was handed over to the Ministry of Culture and Tourism. Although officially called the cultural center (Turkish: Kültür merkezi) the popular name of the building is still Halkevi.

== Present usage ==
The main hall is used by Mersin Opera and ballet. Most of the performances during Mersin International Music Festival are also held in the main hall. The hall sometimes is used for conferences and the like. Mersin Museum is located on the east side of the building. The building also hosts various offices and classrooms of the Ministry of Culture.

== Turkey's top 50 civil engineering projects ==
The Turkish Chamber of Civil Engineers lists the Mersin Halkevi Building as one of the fifty civil engineering feats in Turkey, a list of remarkable engineering projects realized in the first 50 years of the chamber.
