= Athenodorus of Soli =

Ancient Greek philosopher

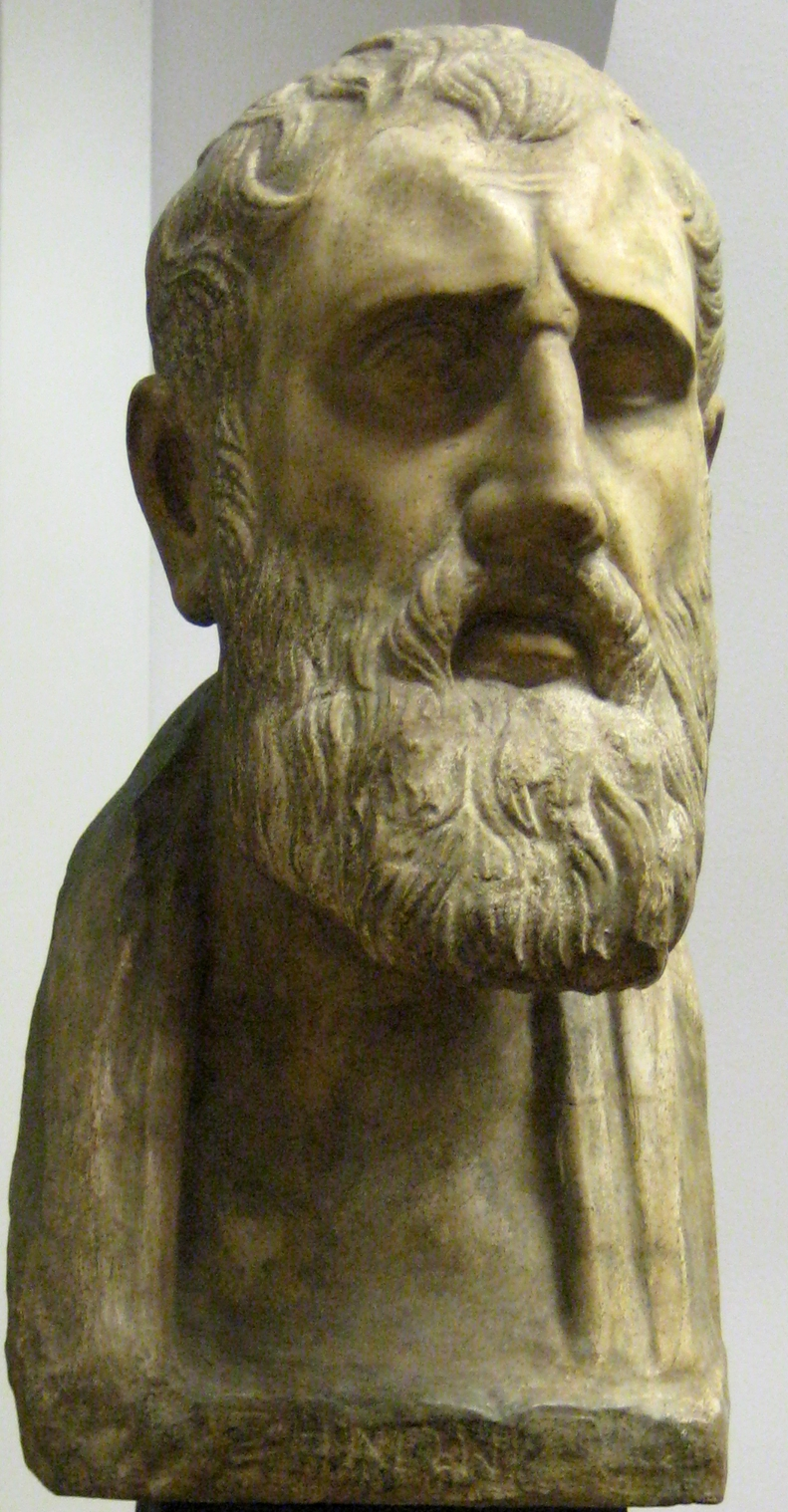
Herma of Zeno of Citium. Cast in Pushkin museum from original in Naples

Athenodorus of Soli (Ancient Greek: Ἀθηνόδωρος ὁ Σολεύς) was a Stoic philosopher, and disciple of Zeno of Citium, who lived in the 3rd century BC.

He was the son of Athenodorus, and was born in the town of Soli, Cilicia, and was the compatriot of another disciple of Zeno, Chrysippus. Athenodorus was the brother of the poet Aratus of Soli, the author of the long didactic poem, Phaenomena. Both brothers followed the teachings of Zeno.

He is mentioned in the list given by Diogenes Laërtius as the disciple of Zeno. He may be the dedicatee of the work On Definite Propositions (Greek: Περὶ τῶν καταγορευτικῶν) written by Chrysippus.
