= Mersin International Music Festival =

Musc festival in Turkey

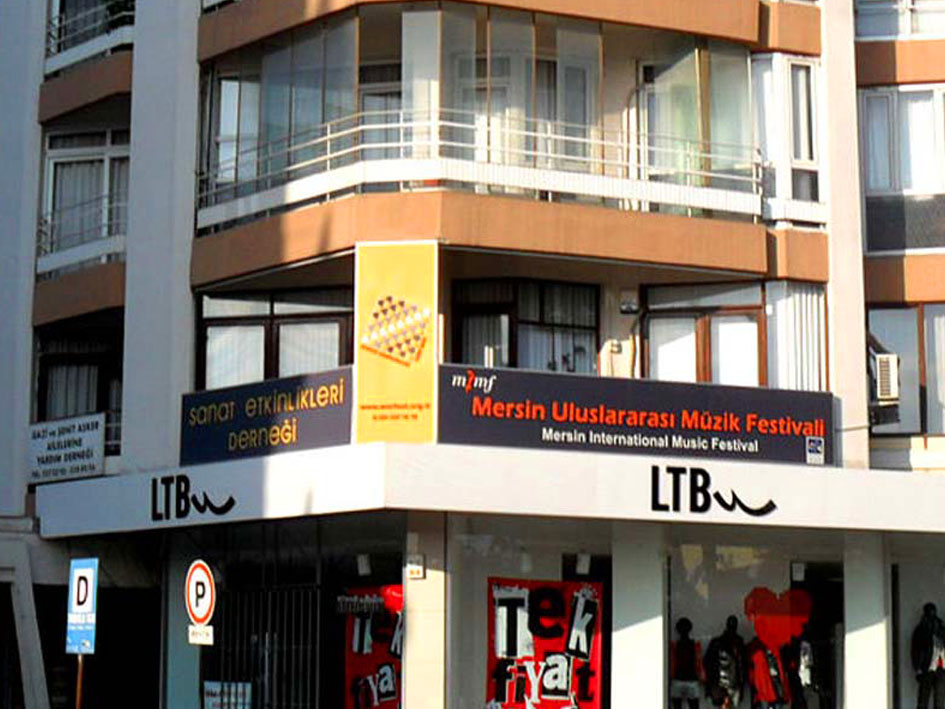
- Festival office
- Genre: Classical, jazz, pop
- Locations: Mersin, Tarsus, Kanlıdivane
- Years active: 2002-present
- Founders: Mersin Cultural Society

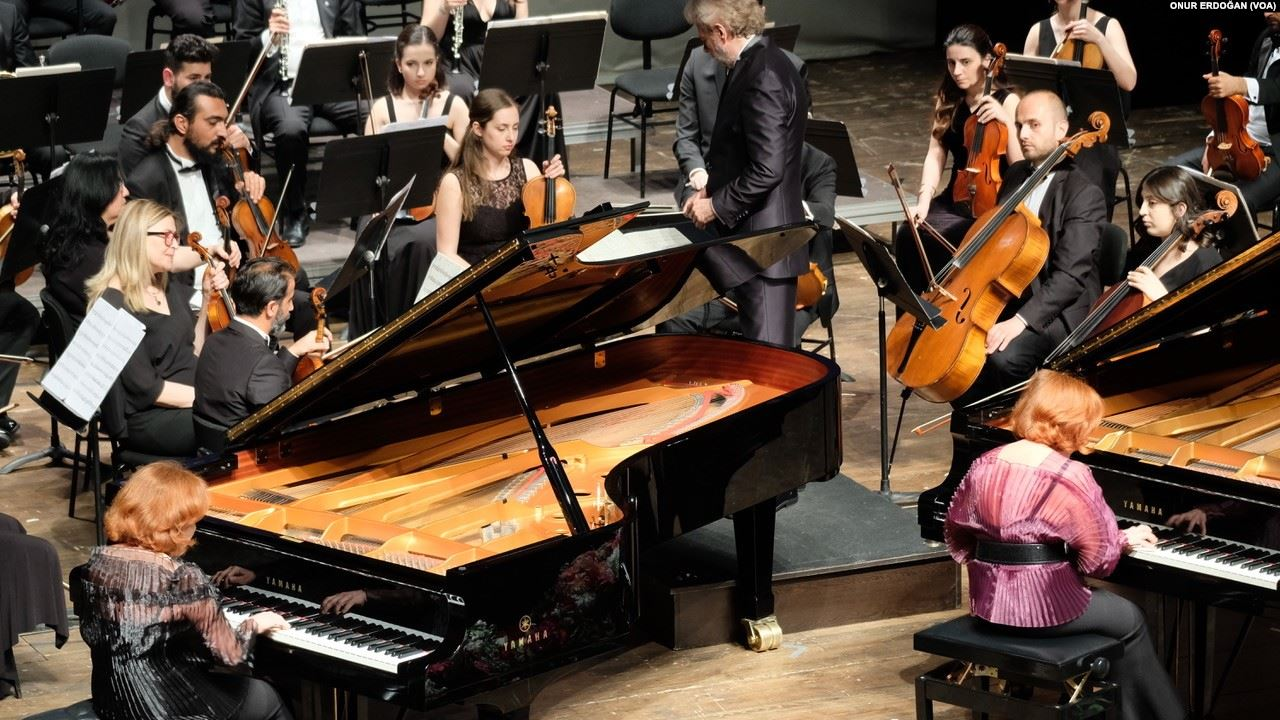
Pekinel sisters performing Mozart's Piano Concerto No. 10 in 2019 festival

Mersin International Music Festival (Turkish: Mersin Uluslararası Müzik Festivali), merfest for short, is a music festival held annually in Mersin, Turkey since 2002. In addition to Turkish artists, performers from Spain, Italy, United States, Hungary, Germany, France, Russia, Japan and Korea have participated in the festival.

== History ==
Mersin International Music Festival is a non-governmental project sponsored by private companies, Mersin University, local municipalities and the Ministry of Culture and Tourism. It was established in 2002 to coincide with the tenth anniversary of the Mersin State Opera and Ballet. The festival was organized until 2007 by Mersin Cultural Society (Turkish: Mersin Kültür Merkezi Derneği). Since 2008, Mersin Art Activities Society (Turkish: Mersin Sanat Etkinlikleri Derneği) organizes the event. In 2007, the festival became a member of the European Festivals Association (EFA). By 2013 the festival had grown to host more than 350 performers during the event. That year it opened with a concert from the Bilkent Symphony Orchestra and Shlomo Mintz. In addition to Turkish artists, performers from Spain, Italy, United States, Hungary, Germany, France, Russia, Japan and Korea have participated in the festival.

== Concert venues ==
Most of the concerts are held in the halls of Mersin Cultural Center (Mersin Halkevi), Congress and Exhibition Center, Uğur Oral Cultural Center and Mersin University's Amphitheater. However, every year one concert is held at St Paulus Church in Tarsus and another one at Kanlıdivane, being an outdoor concert. Tarsus is located 27 km (17 mi) east, and Kanlıdivane 55 km (34 mi) west of Mersin.

== 2010 programme ==
The programme of 2010 Mersin International Music Festival was as follows:

- İdil Biret (piano) with the Mersin State Opera and Ballet Orchestra under Myron Romanul
- Group Lock Out (former Bumerang)
- Group Turkuaz
- Trio Libero/Ankara Trombone quartet
- Yıldız İbrahimova (jazz singer) with Girift Trio (consisting of Tahir Aydoğdu, Bilgin Canaz and Çetin Bilge Akıncı)
- Satoko Tanaka (soprano), Satoko Kato (co-player, piano) and Satoko Inoue (piano)
- Jozsef Lendvay (violin) ensemble
- Denyce Graves (mezzo-soprano) with the Bilkent Symphony Orchestra under Işın Metin
- Ilya Gringolts (violin) with the Bilkent Symphony Orchestra under Işın Metin
- Jass a Turca Quartet
- Jassing Flamenco
- The Ahn Trio

== See also ==
- Mediterranean Opera and Ballet Club
- İçel Sanat Kulübü
- Mersin Citrus Festival
