= Mediterranean Opera and Ballet Club =

Non-profit cultural organization

Akdeniz Opera and Balet Club
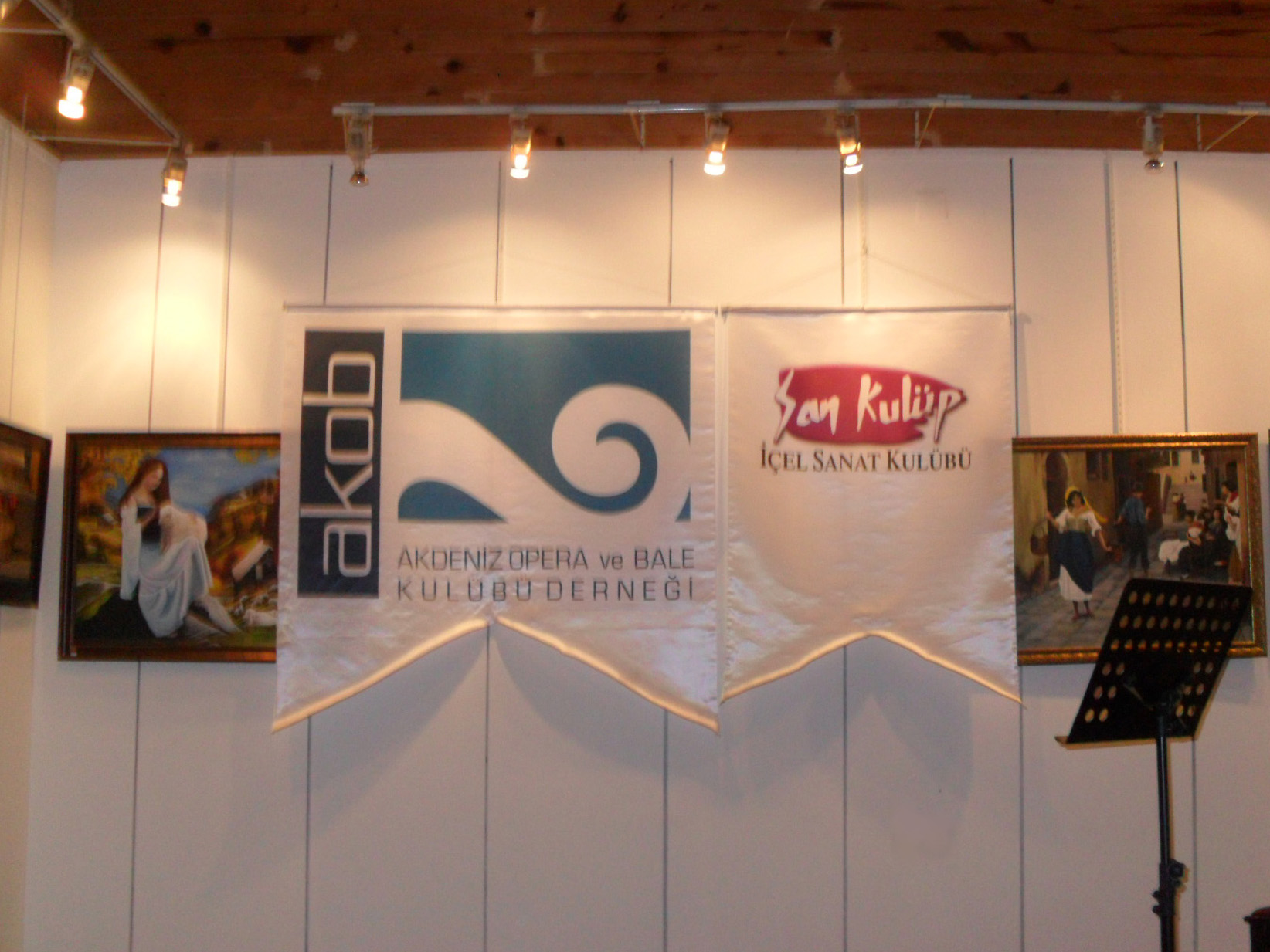
- AKOB and ISK logos during a joint Project in Mersin
- Abbreviation: AKOB
- Legal status: NGO
- Purpose: Music
- Location: Bahçe Mahallesi 4606 Sokak İstiklal İşhanı Kat:2 Akdeniz MERSİN
- Region served: Mersin Province, Turkey
- Leader: Fazıl Tütüner
- Website: akob.org/en/hakkimizda.htm

Mediterranean Opera and Ballet Club (Turkish: Akdeniz Opera ve Bale Kulübü, AKOB) is a non-profit cultural organization based in Mersin, Turkey.

== History ==
Mersin Culture Center Association, another association known for valuable contributions in the past to musical life of Mersin, is presently engaged to Mersin International Music Festival. Thus AKOB was founded in 2008 to take over and revive its old spirit and mission under the guidance and direction of the renowned composer and maestro Selman Ada, who was then living in Mersin,

== Activities ==
In 2009, together with the artists of Mersin State Opera and Ballet, AKOB organized a tribute concert for the passionate lover of Mersin (who was born in Limonlu, a town in Mersin Province), composer Prof. Nevit Kodallı. Another concert was organized for Hanri Atat, a patron of art and music in Mersin.

In 2010, after cooperating with Istanbul Austrian Culture Office and Istanbul Goethe Institute, AOBK organized four concerts by international artists. The same year, AOBK began publishing a culture and art magazine, which includes English as well as Turkish articles to address to foreign readers.

== See also ==
- İçel Sanat Kulübü (Art club of Mrsin)
