= Soli (Cilicia) =

Ancient Cilician city

Coordinates: 36°44′31″N 34°32′24″E

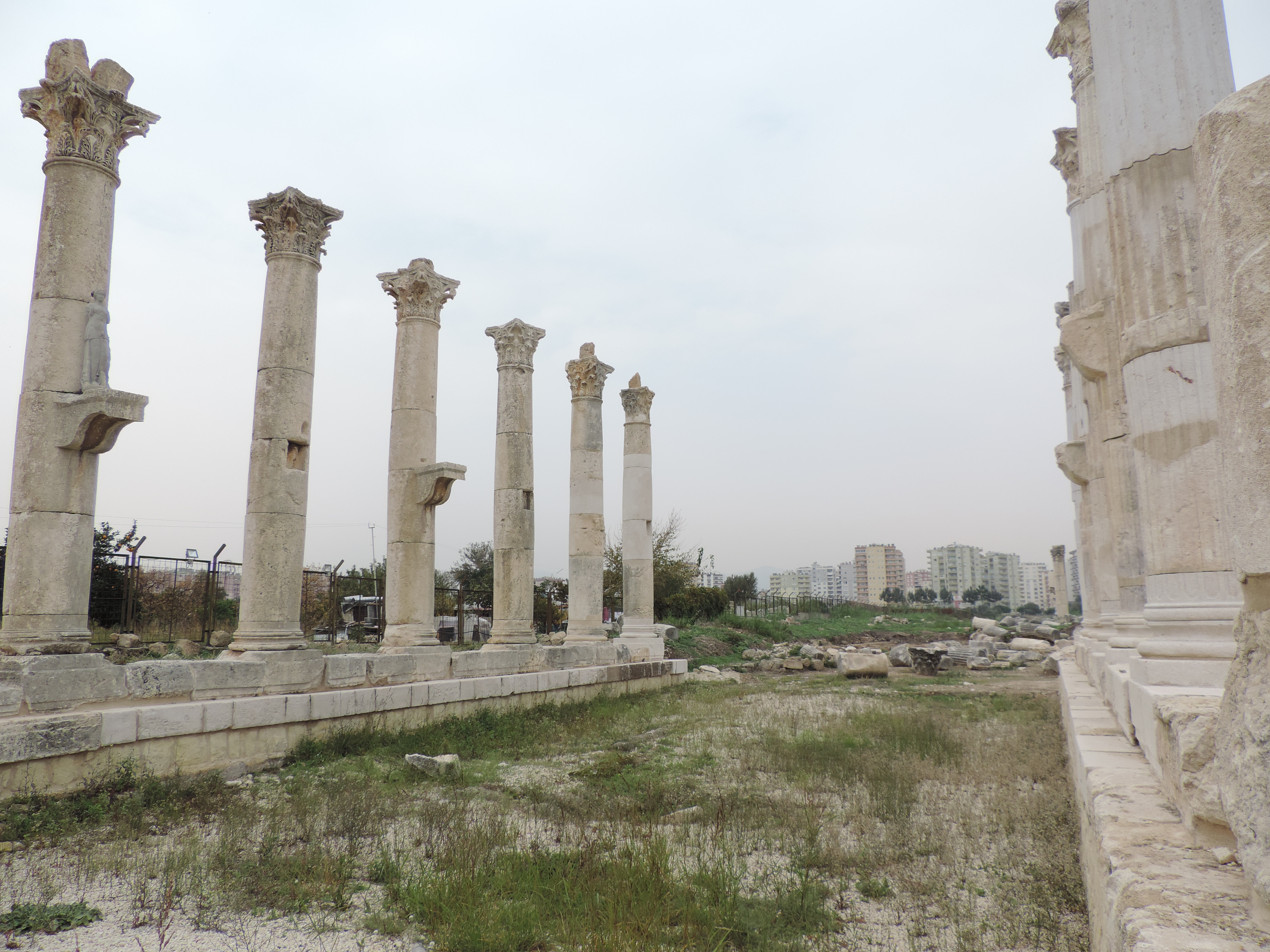
Roman colonnade at the site.

Soli (Ancient Greek: Σόλοι, Sóloi), often rendered Soli/Pompeiopolis (Ancient Greek: Πομπηϊούπολις), was an ancient city and port in Cilicia, 11 km west of Mersin in present-day Turkey.

== Geography ==
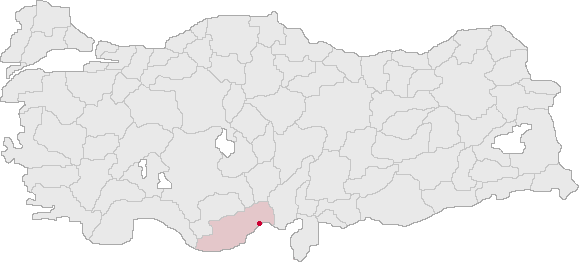
The red dot shows the position of Mersin in a map of present-day Turkey. At this scale, it coincides with the position of Soli.

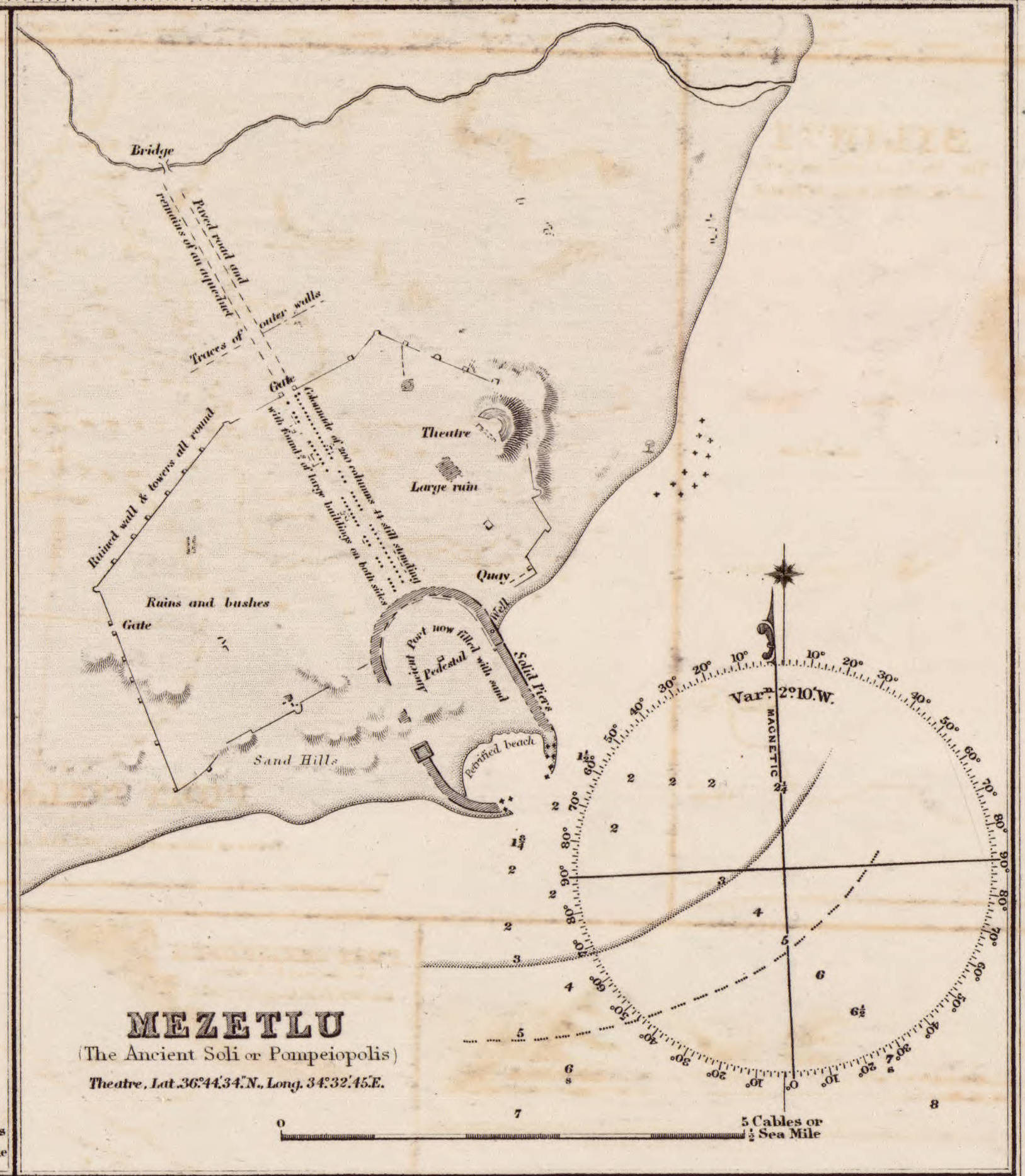
Pompeiopolis from an 1812 Admiralty Chart

Located in Southern Anatolia, on the edge of the timber-rich Taurus Mountains and fertile Cilician alluvial plain, Soli was constantly at or near regional boundaries; Kizzuwatna and Tarḫuntašša during Luwian/Hittite occupation, and Cilicia Trachea and Cilicia Pedia during Graeco-Roman period. This, coupled with the city's good harbor and proximity to the Cilician Gates ensured that Soli was consistently of strategic importance throughout ancient history.

== History ==
=== Neolithic ===
Archaeological evidence indicates a human presence in the area as early as 7000 BCE at the Yumuktepe mound, 9 km to the northeast.

=== Late Bronze Age ===
The first known Luwian settlements and fortifications at Soli proper date the 15th century BCE, and the city was an active port from that time onwards. Soli may have functioned as the harbor city of Kizzuwatna, but this is disputed. The region was controlled by the Hittite Empire from the 14th-13th centuries BCE, and recovered Mycenaean bronzes and ceramics indicate trade with the Aegean.

The Bronze Age Collapse ended Hittite hegemony in Cilicia, and Soli may have suffered an attack from the Sea Peoples. This "destruction layer" is populated by burned and broken pottery and is followed by a hiatus in human occupation.

=== Iron Age ===
==== Archaic Period ====
Achaean and Rhodian colonists reestablished a permanent human presence at Soli between 700 and 690 BCE, leaving behind geometric pottery characteristic of the Archaic period.

=== Classical Age ===
==== Persian Period ====
Cilicia became a vassal state to and satrapy of the Achaemenid Empire after the reign of Cyrus the Great, assisting the Persians in multiple military campaigns. Soli briefly allied itself with the Delian League, but otherwise prospered under Achaemenid hegemony, minting coins to the Persian standard until Alexander the Great drove the Persians out of Cilicia in 333 BCE. He imposed a fine of 200 talents on the city for favoring the Persians, imposed a democratic constitution, made a sacrifice to Asclepius and held honorary games. A year later, Alexander extracted three triremes from Soli and nearby Mallus to assist in his siege of Tyre.

==== Hellenistic Period ====
After Alexander's death (323 BCE), Soli fell to the control of Ptolemy I Soter, and was attacked unsuccessfully by Demetrius I Poliorcetes. Cilicia traded hands between Alexander's successors until the end of the Fifth Syrian War (197 BCE), at which point Soli was held by the Seleucid Empire. Throughout the Hellenistic Period, the city gained considerable local autonomy, minting its own coinage and largely conducting its own affairs. Rhodes appealed to the Roman Senate to liberate Soli from the Seleucids on the grounds of their common heritage, but this case was dropped. Tigranes the Great of Armenia sacked Soli during the Seleucid Empire's collapse (83 BCE), and took the city's citizens to inhabit Tigranocerta, his newly founded capital.

==== Roman Period ====
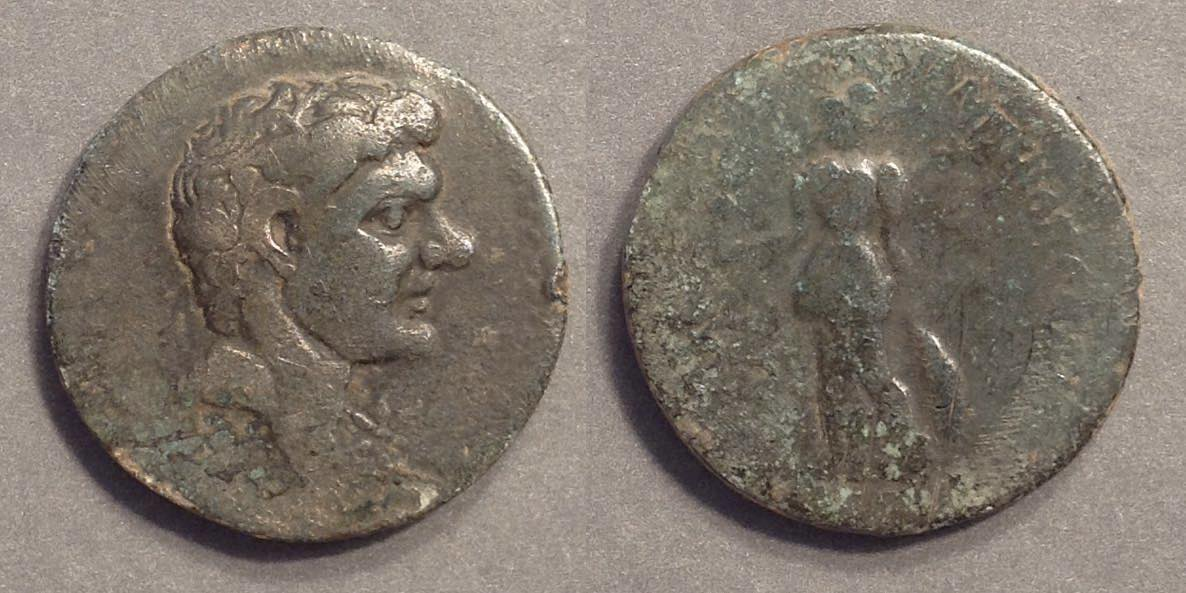
A portrait of Pompey on a 23 mm bronze coin struck at Pompeiopolis in 83/4 during the reign of Domitian.

In 67 BCE, the lex Gabinia was passed by the Roman Senate, endowing Pompeius Magnus (Pompey) with proconsular powers to combat piracy in the Eastern Mediterranean. After subduing the pirates, he resettled some surrendered pirates in the depopulated Soli, renaming it Pompeiopolis (not to be confused with the Pompeiopolis in nearby Paphlagonia, also founded around this time). The harbor was improved and expanded with Roman concrete, and new city walls, a theater and baths were built. The harbor was renovated again by 130 CE under the aegis of Antoninus Pius (though the project may have been begun by Hadrian), and the port city flourished under Roman rule.

The Soli-Pompeiopolis became a bishopric sometime around 300 CE. In 525 CE, the city was leveled by a powerful earthquake and largely abandoned.

== Etymology ==
Diogenes Laërtius wrote that Solon founded Soli as an Athenian colony, and named the city after himself. This account is in conflict with the work of Strabo and comparative archaeological studies of the region. While largely discredited, the idea was preserved in the word solecism, derived from σόλοικος (sóloikos, "speaking incorrectly"), as since the dialect of Greek spoken there was thought to be corrupted form of Attic Greek.

"...[Solon then] lived in Cilicia and founded a city which he called Soli after his own name. In it he settled some few Athenians, who in process of time corrupted the purity of Attic and were said to "solecize."

Alternately, soloi could derive from local economic resources, namely "metal ingots" or "a mass of iron."

Adrienne Mayor suggested that the inhabitants of Soli might have attributed their city's name to Solois, an Athenian who was helplessly in love with the Amazon Antiope and for that reason they minted coins with Amazons on them, however this theory has been criticised as weak on account of insufficient evidence as neither Solois nor Antiope were ever unambiguously connected to Soli.

The city may be mentioned in the Šunaššura Treaty, between Hittite king Šuppiluliuma I and Kizzuwatna, as Ellipra or Pitura. These may alternately refer to the Yumuktepe site, but certainly refer to one of the few harbor settlements on the border between Kizzuwatna and Tarḫuntašša.

It has been suggested that Soli corresponds to the coastal city Sallusa in the later Annals of Ḫattušili III, which indicates that some Luwian variant of the classical name may have predated Hellenic settlement of the area.

Locally, the site is known as Viranşehir, meaning "Ruined City".

== Notable natives ==
- Philemon (c. 362 BC – c. 262 BC) a poet of the New Comedy.
- Aratus of Soli (c. 315 BC/310 BC – c. 240 BC) a didactic poet.
- Athenodorus of Soli (c. 3rd Century BC) a Stoic.
- Chrysippus of Soli (c. 279 BC – c. 206 BC) a Stoic.
- Crantor (4th-3rd Century BC) a philosopher of the Academy.

== Gallery ==
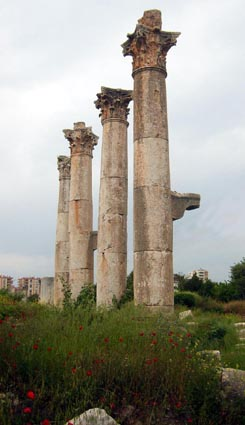

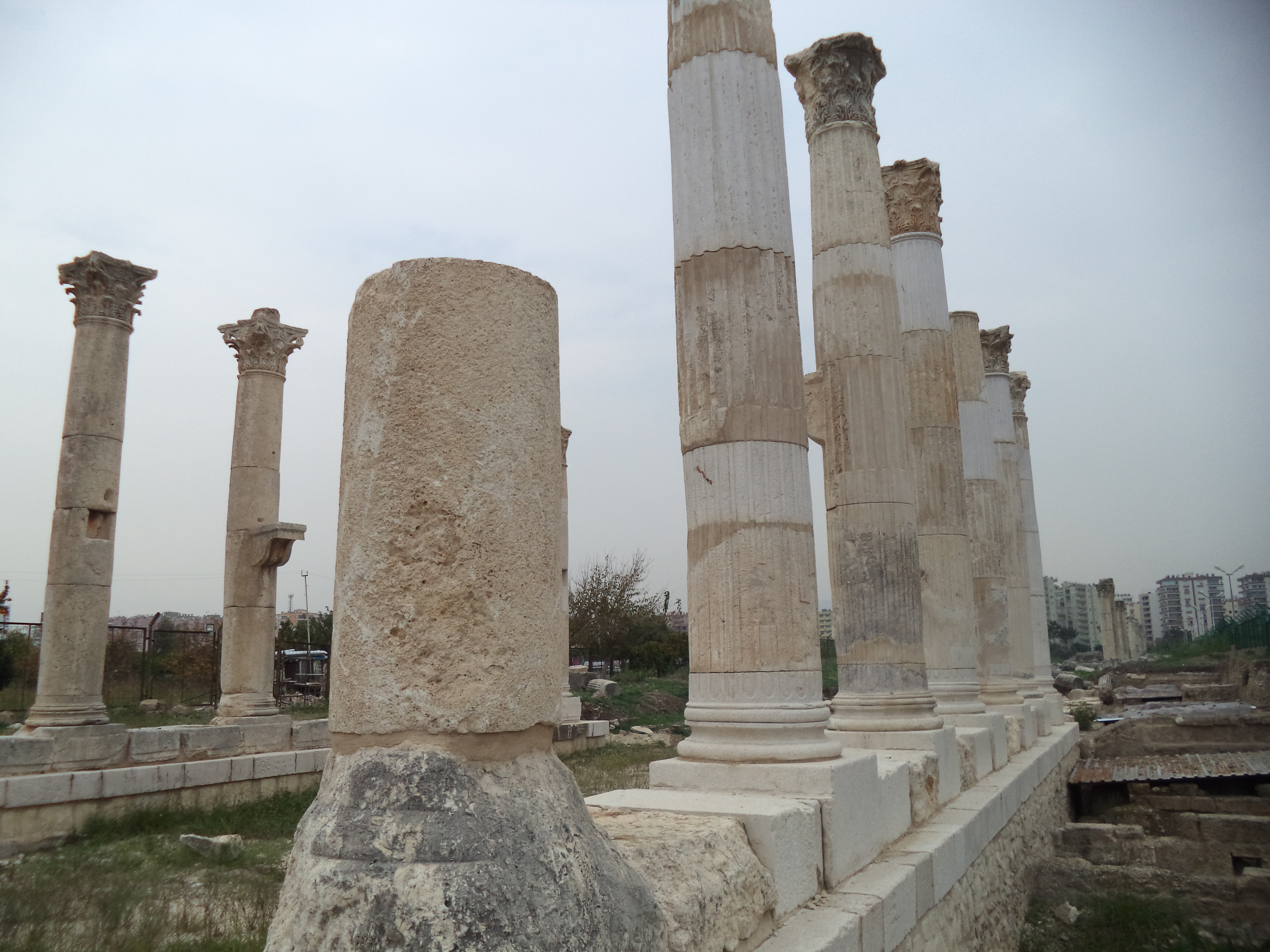

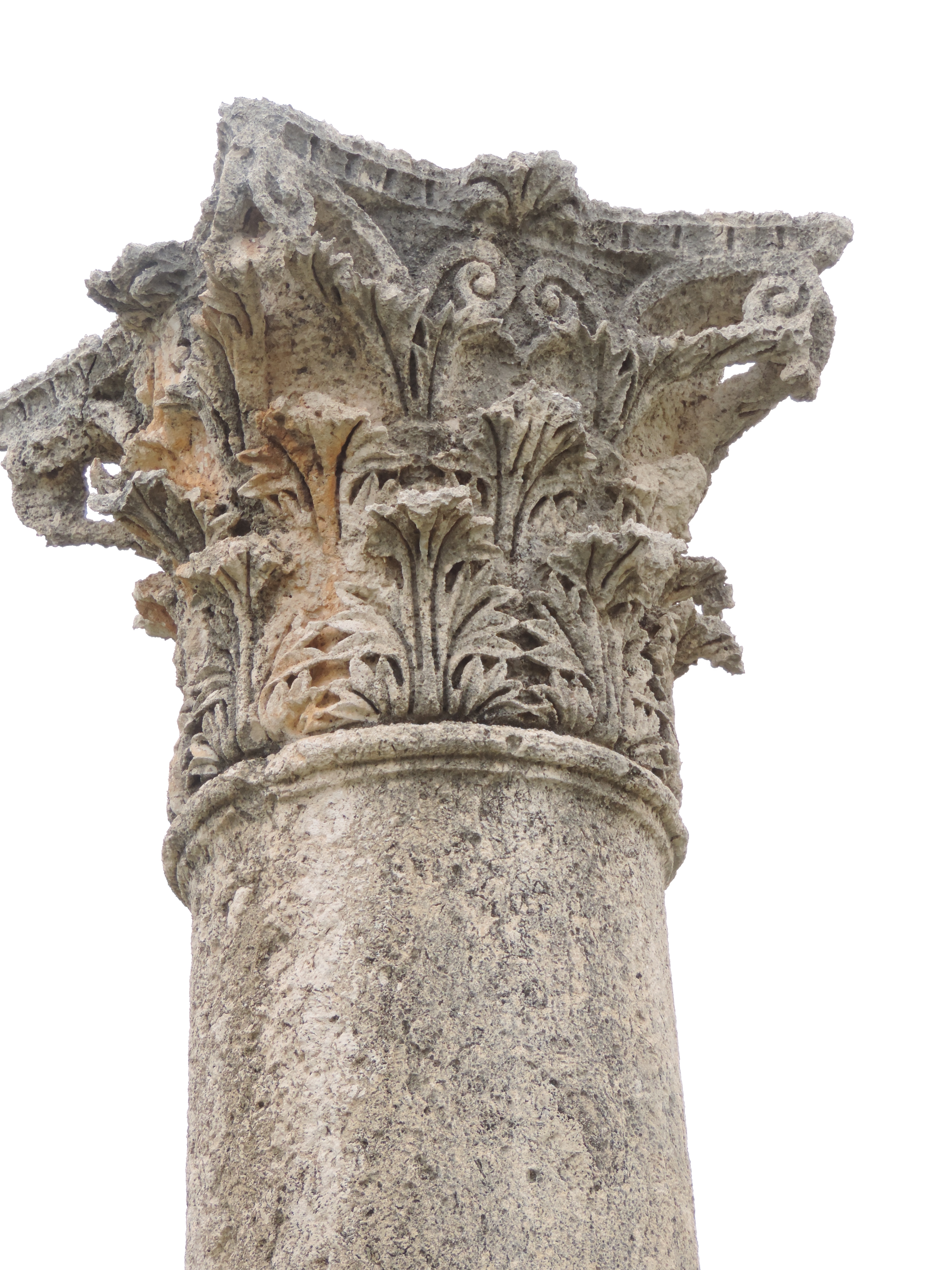

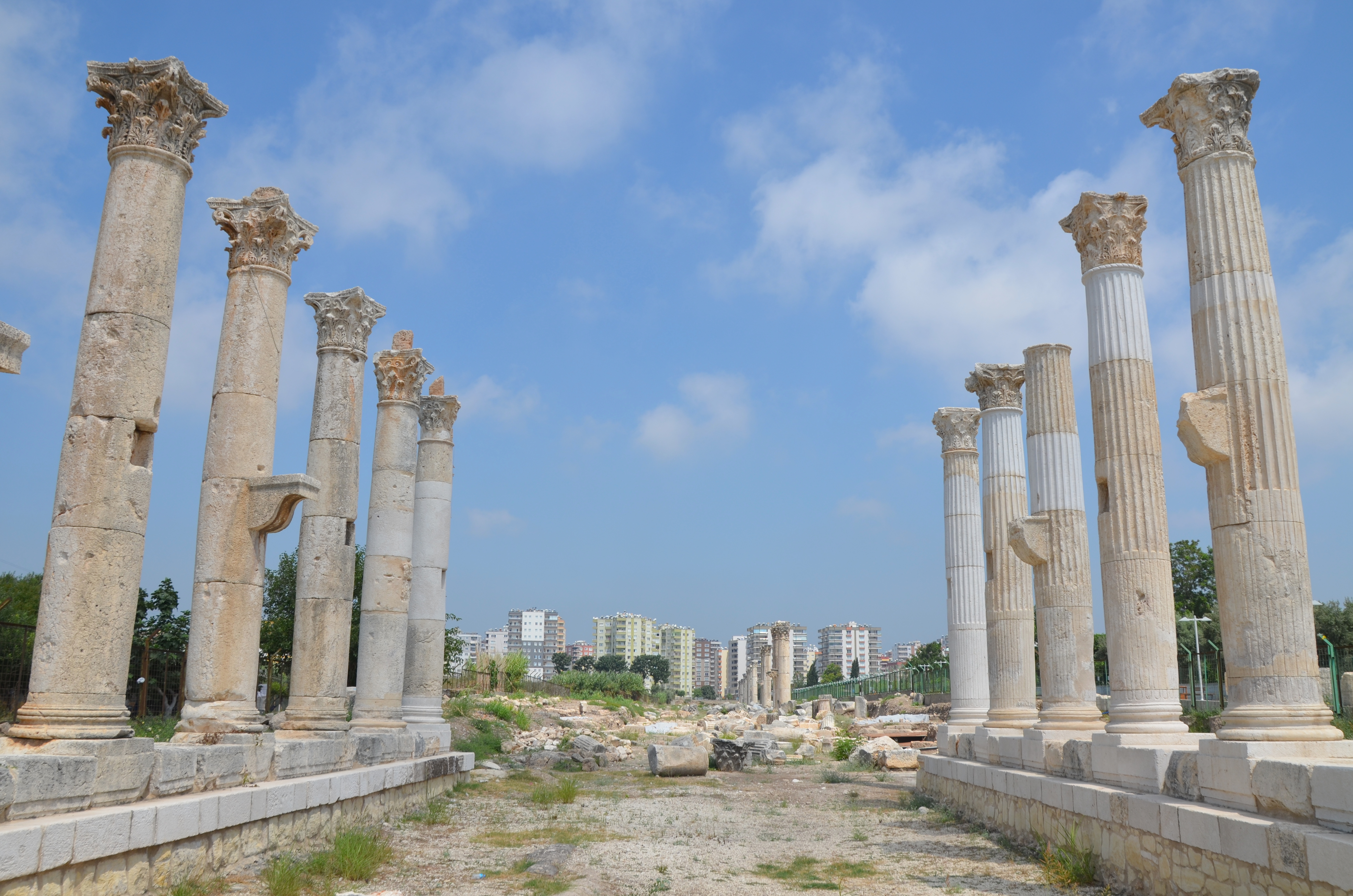
