= Yumuktepe =

Ruin mound in Turkey

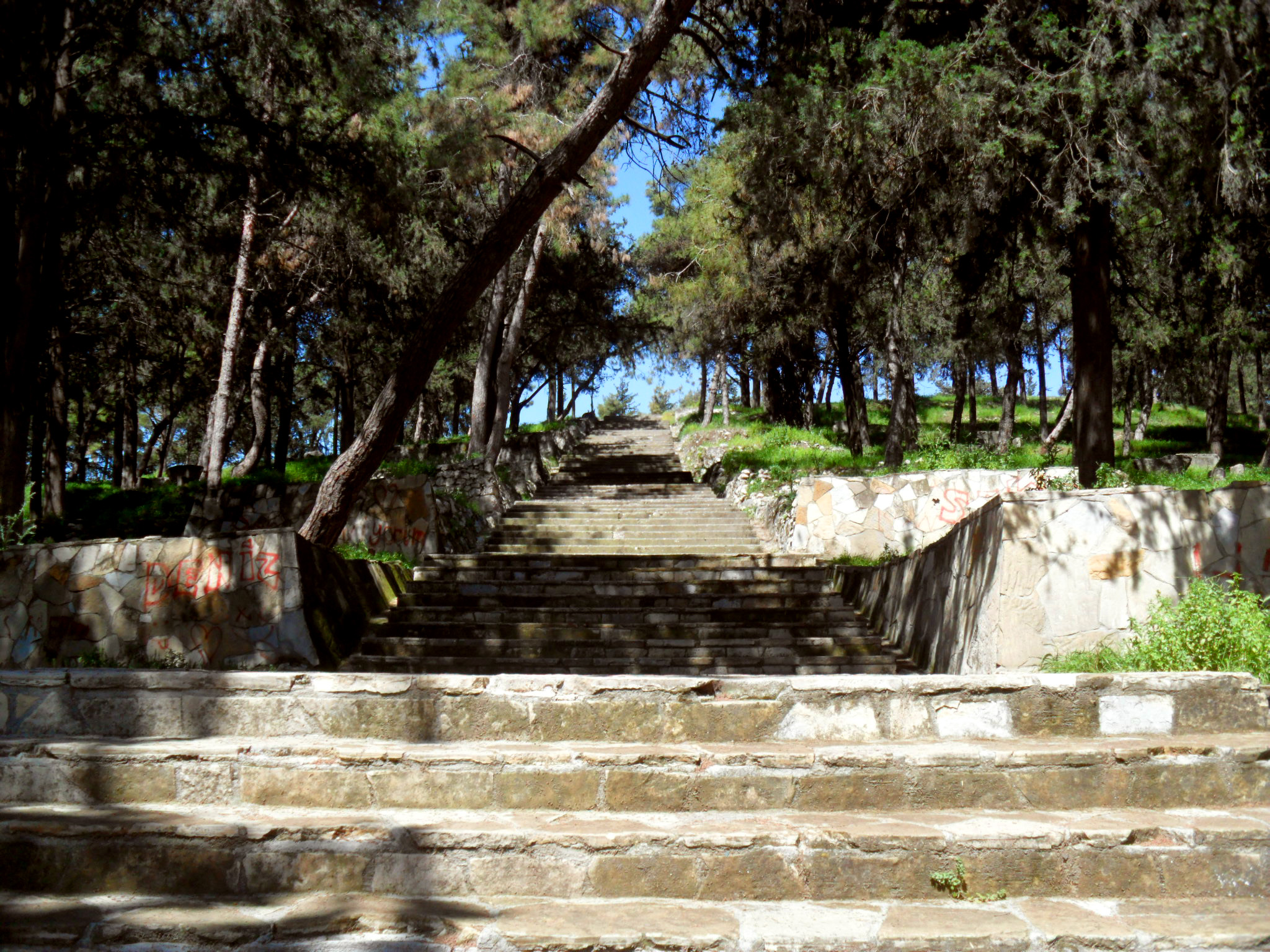

- Location within Turkey
- 36°48′N 34°36′E
- Type: Settlement
- Periods: Neolithic Age to Byzantine Empire
- Location: Mersin, Turkey
- Region: Mediterranean Region

Yumuktepe, also known as Yümüktepe, is a tell (ruin mound) within the city borders of Mersin, Turkey. In 1936, the mound was on the outskirts of Mersin, but after a rapid increase of population, the mound was surrounded by the Toroslar municipality of Mersin.

== Excavations ==
Excavations took place between 1936 and 1938 by the British archaeologist John Garstang (1876–1956). He was the founder of the British Institute in Ankara, have revealed a Neolithic settlement which continued up to medieval ages. However, the excavations halted during World War II and some documents in the Liverpool University were lost after an air raid. After the war, John Garstang as well as Veli Sevin of Istanbul University and Isabella Caneva of Sapienza University of Rome continued the excavations.
