= Muğdat Mosque =

Mosque in Turkey

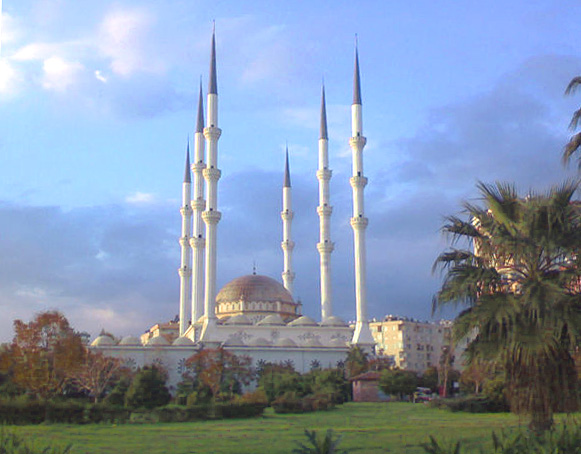

Religion
- Affiliation: Islam
- Province: Mersin Province
- Region: Mediterranean Region
- Status: Active

Location
- Location: Mersin, Turkey
- Interactive map of Muğdat Mosque
- Coordinates: 36°46′57.31″N 34°36′4.92″E

Architecture
- Type: Mosque
- Style: Ottoman
- Groundbreaking: 1980
- Completed: 1998

Specifications
- Capacity: 5500
- Minaret: 6
- Minaret height: 81 metres (266 feet).

Muğdat Mosque (Turkish: Muğdat Camisi) is a mosque in Mersin, Turkey. It is named after Miqdad ibn Aswad, one of the early Muslims.

== Geography ==
The mosque was built in the 1980s in the Yenişehir second-level district of Mersin. Although the official name of the neighbourhood is Gazi, it is usually called Muğdat after the name of the mosque. The mosque is situated at north of Mersin Archaeological Museum and the Mersin Naval Museum. Its distance to Mediterranean seaside is about 300 metres (980 ft). The total area of the mosque including the yard is 7,900 square metres (85,000 sq ft) and the base area of the building is 3,070 square metres (33,000 sq ft).

== The building ==
The mosque has a capacity to serve 5500 people. With this capacity, it is the largest mosque in Mersin and the third largest mosque built during the Republican era of Turkey. It is also one of the three six-minaret mosques in Turkey. (Originally, the mosque had four minarets, the next two were added recently) The height of the minarets is 81 metres (266 ft). On each minaret there are three minaret balconies (Turkish: şerefe).

Muğdat mosque is actually a complex like the traditional Ottoman mosques. In addition to religious services, the mosque has facilities including a conference room, a library, a guest house a condolences room and a health center. The basement of the building is a supermarket.

== Gallery ==
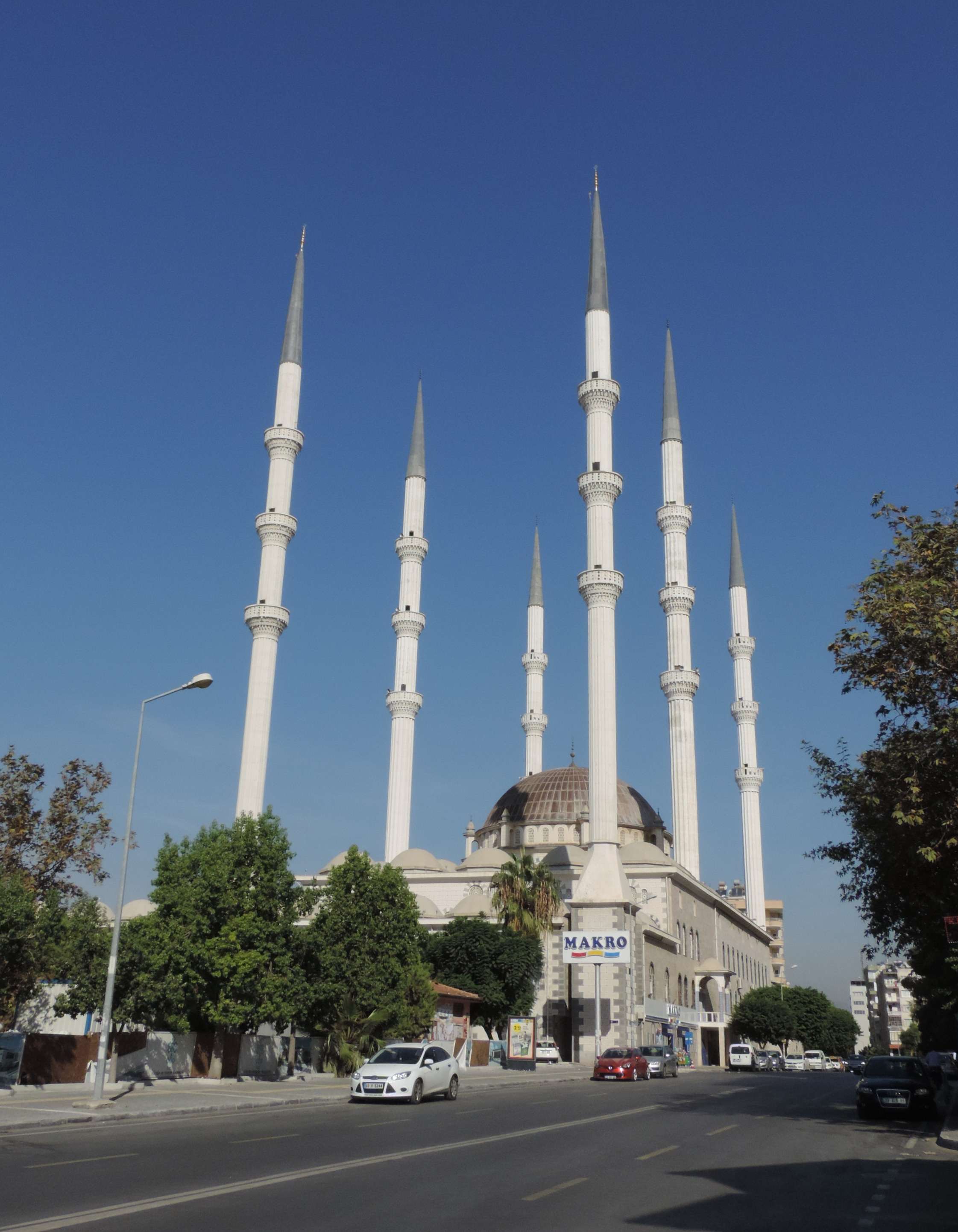
View from south-east

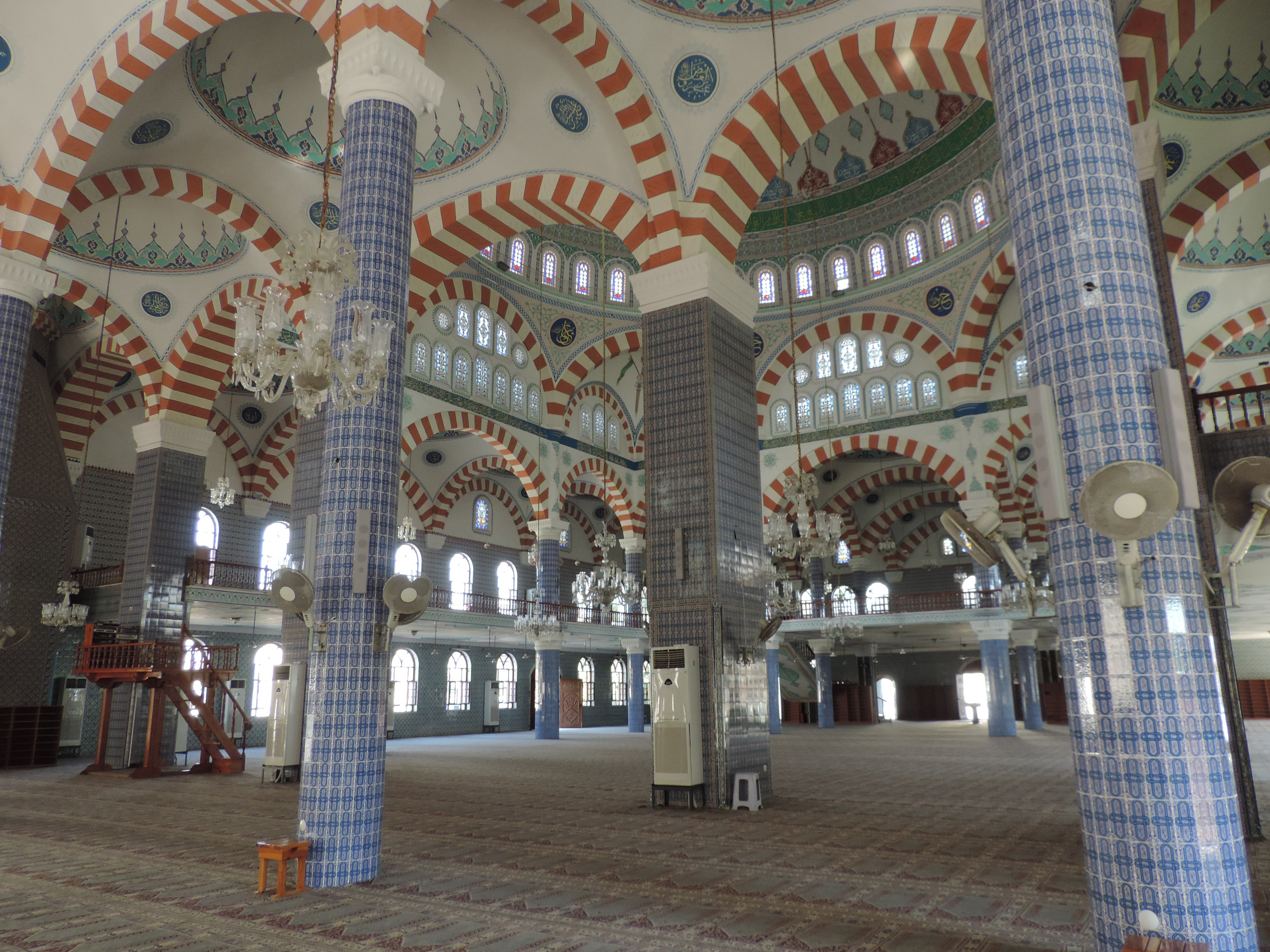
Inside the mosque

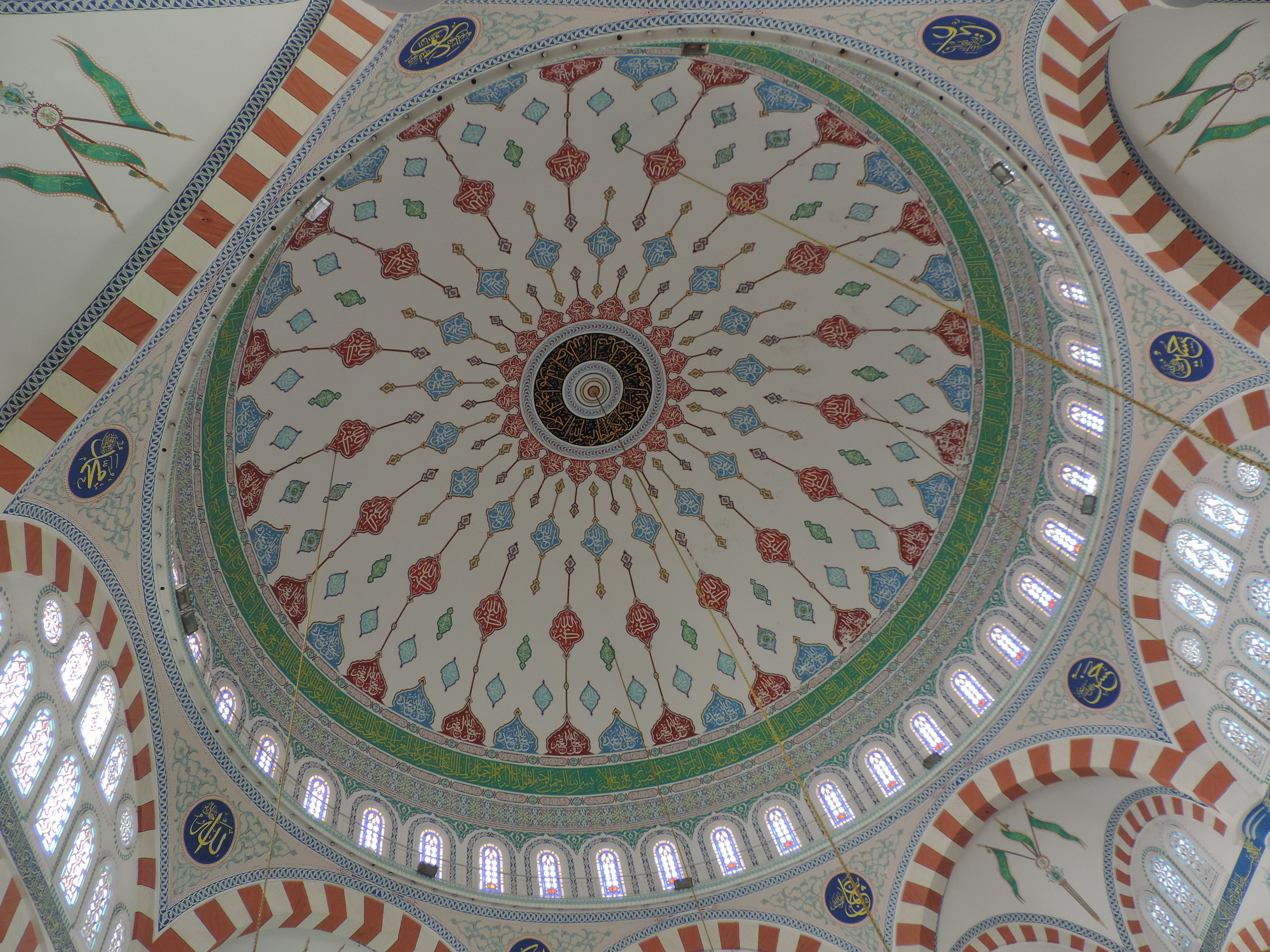
View to the main dome

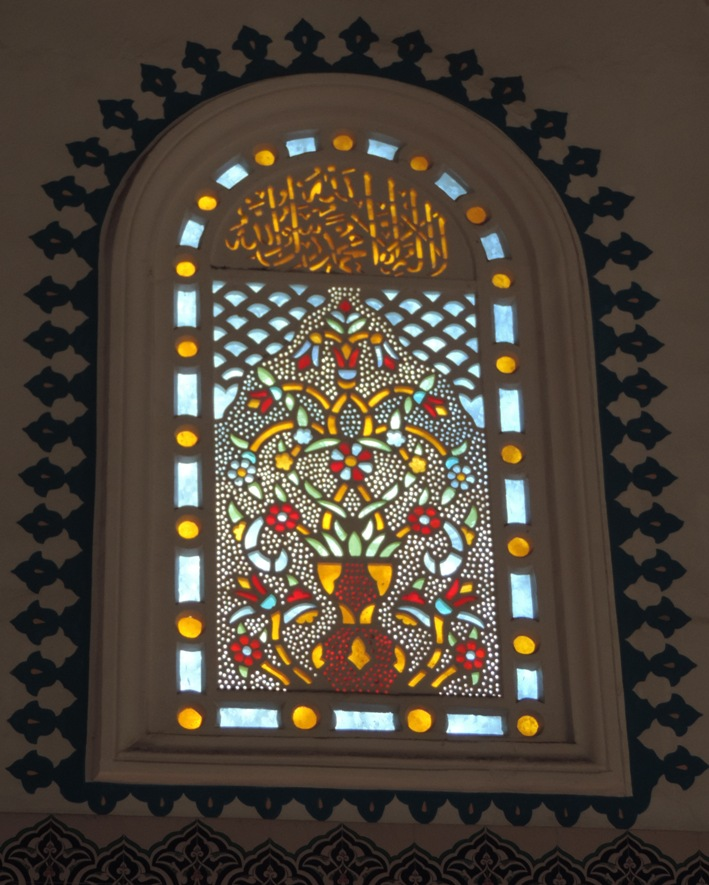
Stained glass over the south entrance

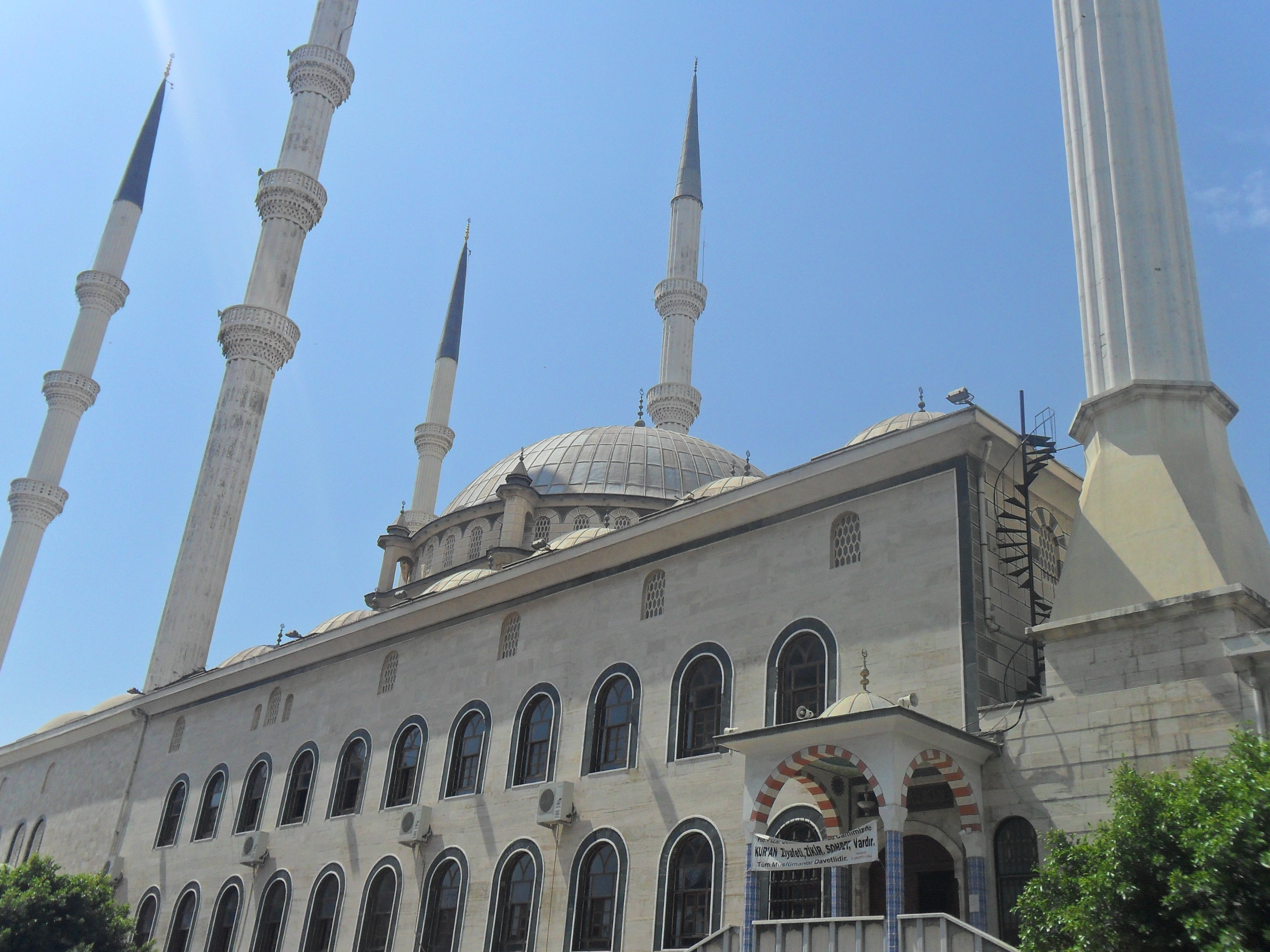
The façade from north-east
