= Mersin Naval Museum =

Naval museum in Mersin, Turkey

- Mersin Deniz Müzesi
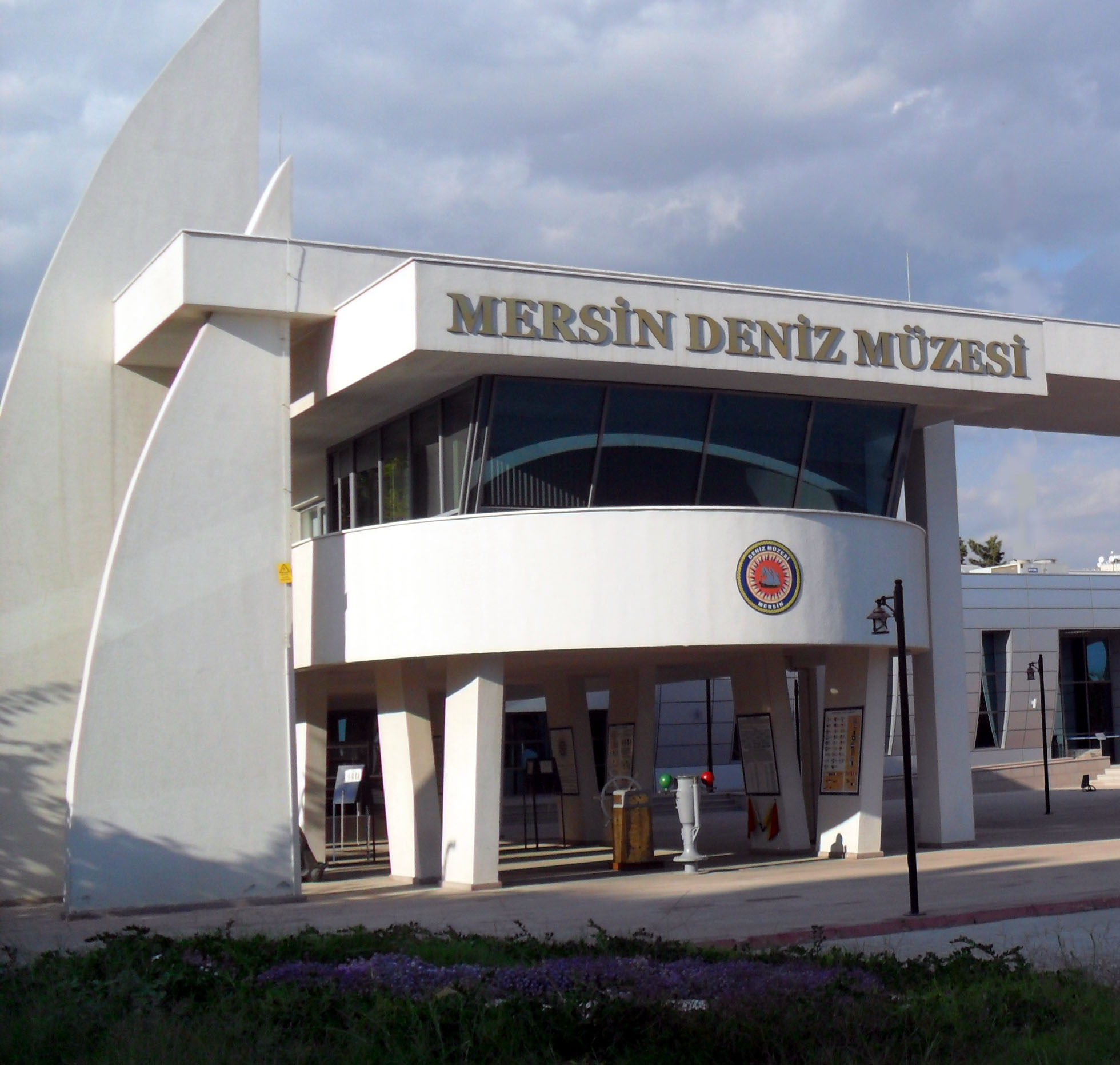

- Location of Naval Museum in Turkey
- Established: 2011
- Location: Adnan Menderes Bulvarı Yenişehir Mersin
- Coordinates: 36.8063°N 34.6201°E
- Type: Naval articles
- Owner: Turkish Naval Forces
- Website: mersindenizmuzesi.dzkk.tsk.tr/tr

Mersin Naval Museum (Turkish: Mersin Deniz Müzesi) is a naval museum in Mersin, Turkey.

== Geography ==
The museum is located in the Yenişehir municipality of Mersin. It is on Adnan Menderes Boulevard and about 100 metres (330 ft) to the Mediterranean Sea side. It is next to the Mersin Archaeological Museum. The Muğdat Mosque is to the northeast of the museum. Its total area (including the yard) is 8,044 square metres (86,580 sq ft). The ground area of the building is 1,850 square metres (19,900 sq ft).

== History ==
Mersin is one of the important ports of Turkey. The Turkish Navy decided to establish a naval museum there and construction began on 16 September 2009. The Mersin Naval Museum is the fourth naval museum in Turkey after those of Istanbul, Çanakkale and İskenderun. It was opened to public on 14 July 2011.

== Museum ==
In the 400 square metres (4,300 sq ft) main hall, objects such as uniforms, weapons, historical battle ship models and paintings about important battles and portraits of admirals such as Çaka Bey, Umur Bey, Piri Reis and Cezayirli Gazi Hasan Pasha are displayed. In the interactive display hall the visitors can watch videos of the cruiser Hamidye, the Mahmudiye, the Battle of Preveza and Hayreddin Barbarossa, the minelayer Nusret, and the cruiser Yavuz. Bigger military equipment such as radar, torpedoes, etc. are displayed in the museum's yard.

== Gallery ==
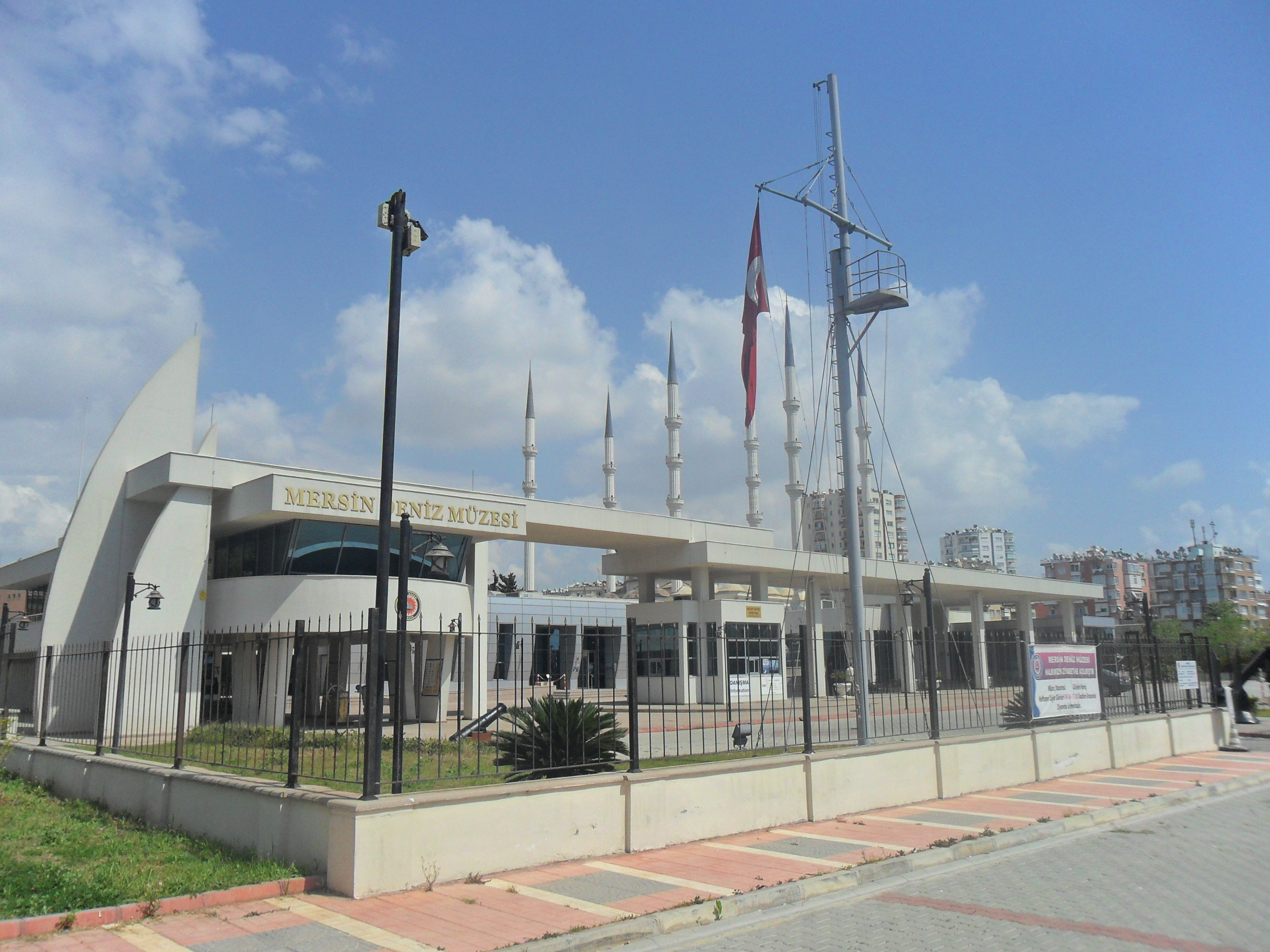
Exterior view of Mersin Naval Museum

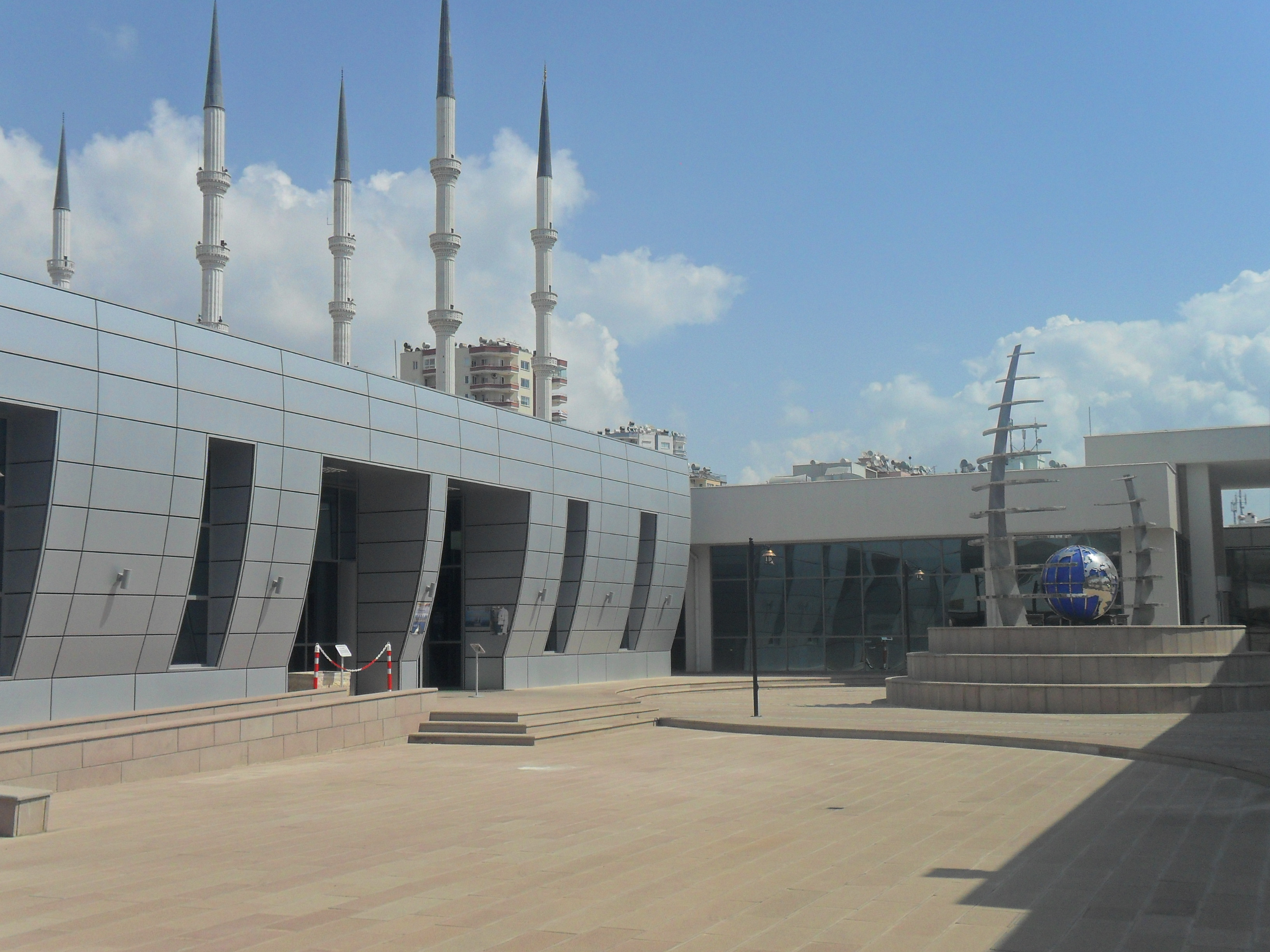
Mersin Naval Museum courtyard

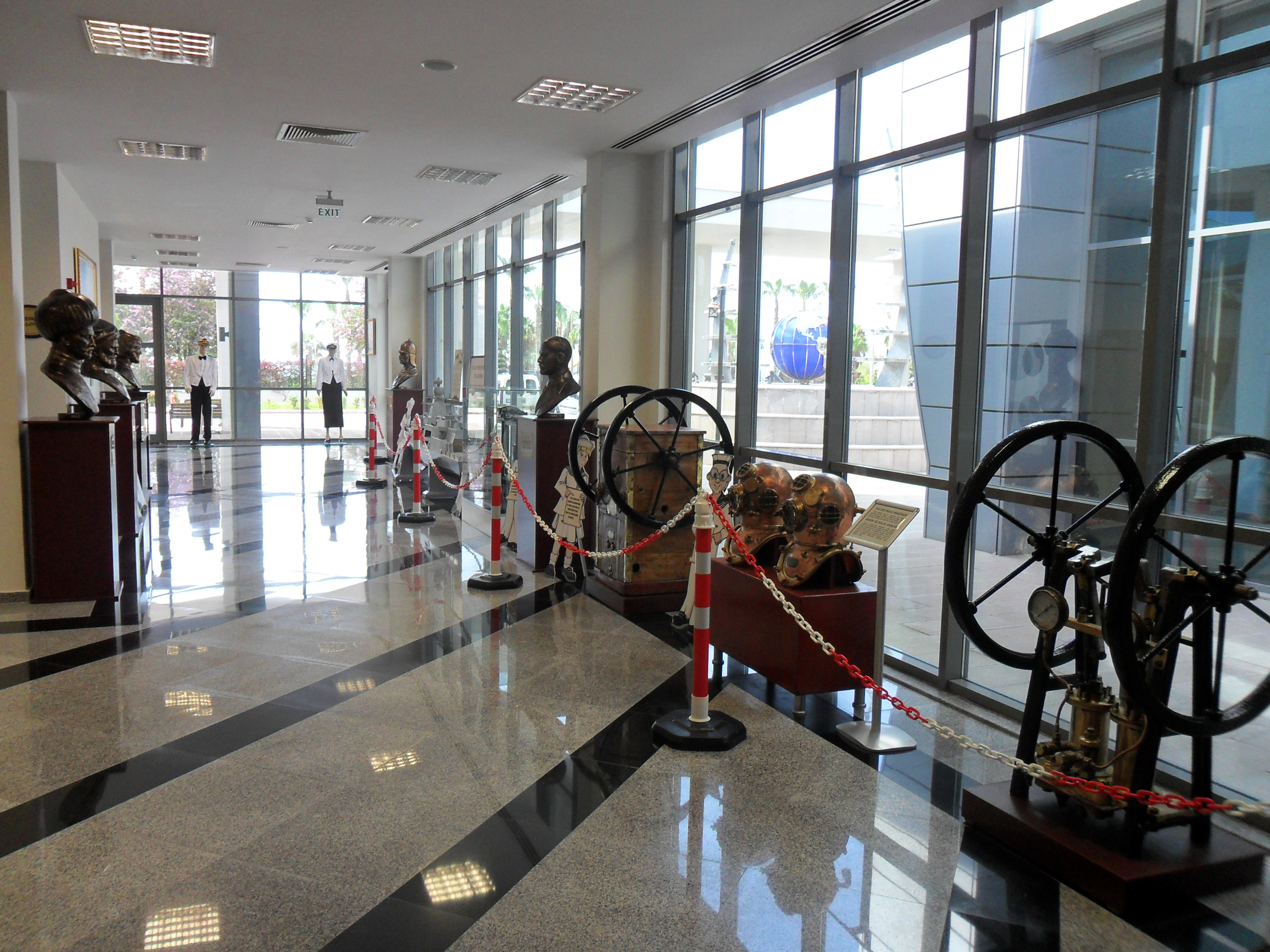
Mersin Naval Museum interior view

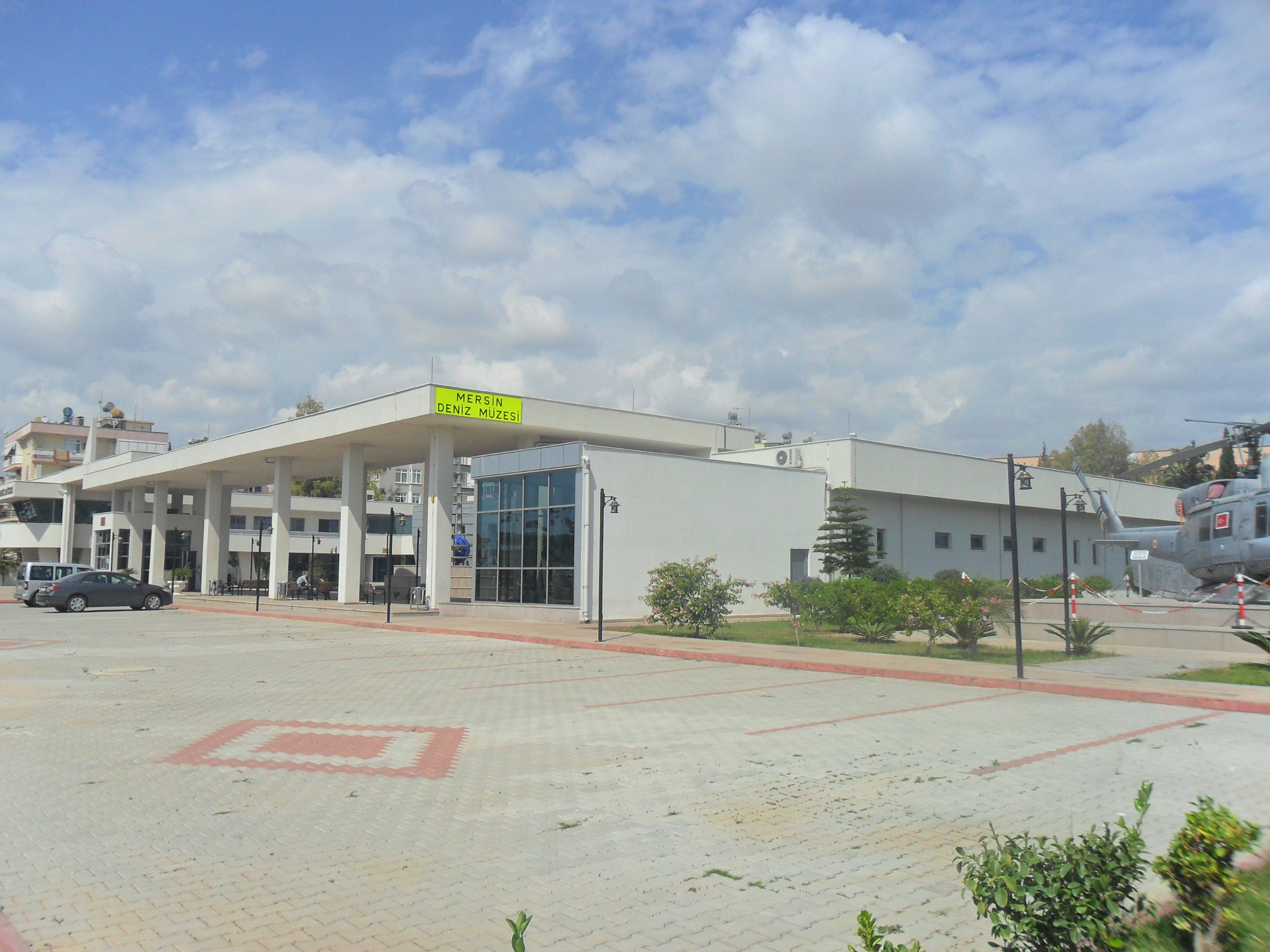
Mersin Naval Museum left facade

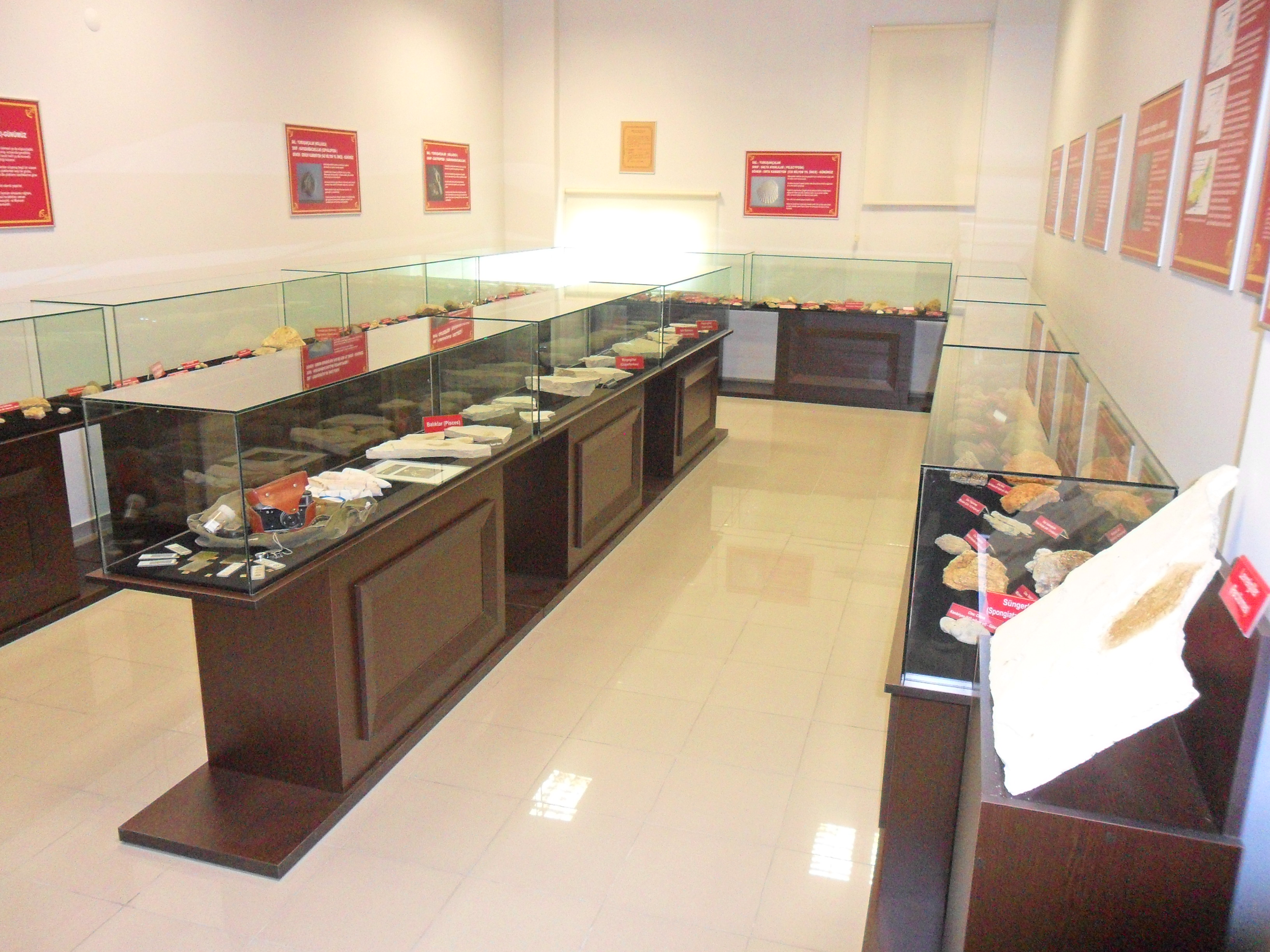
Caner Gönyeli Exhibition Room

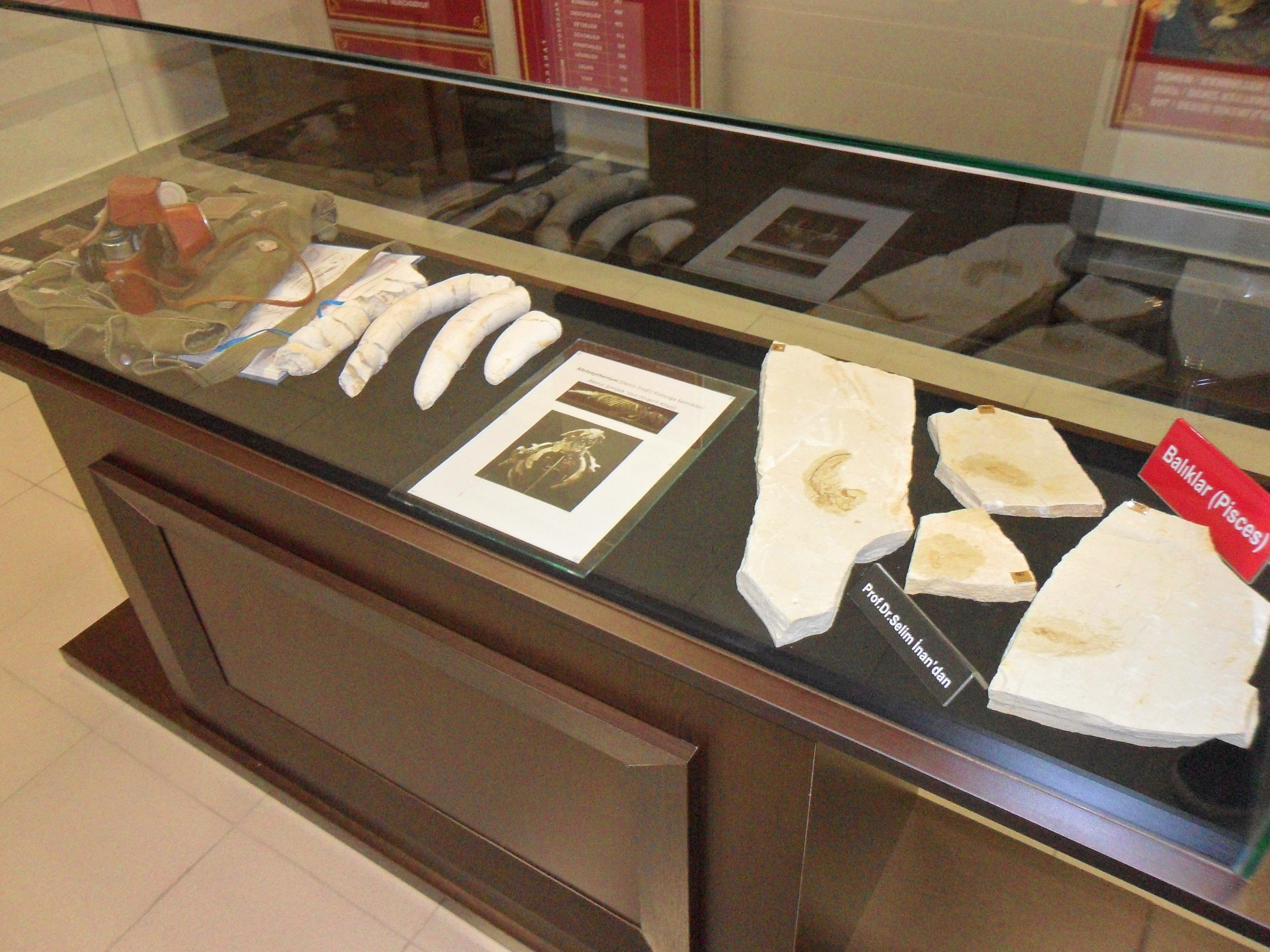
Various fish fossils

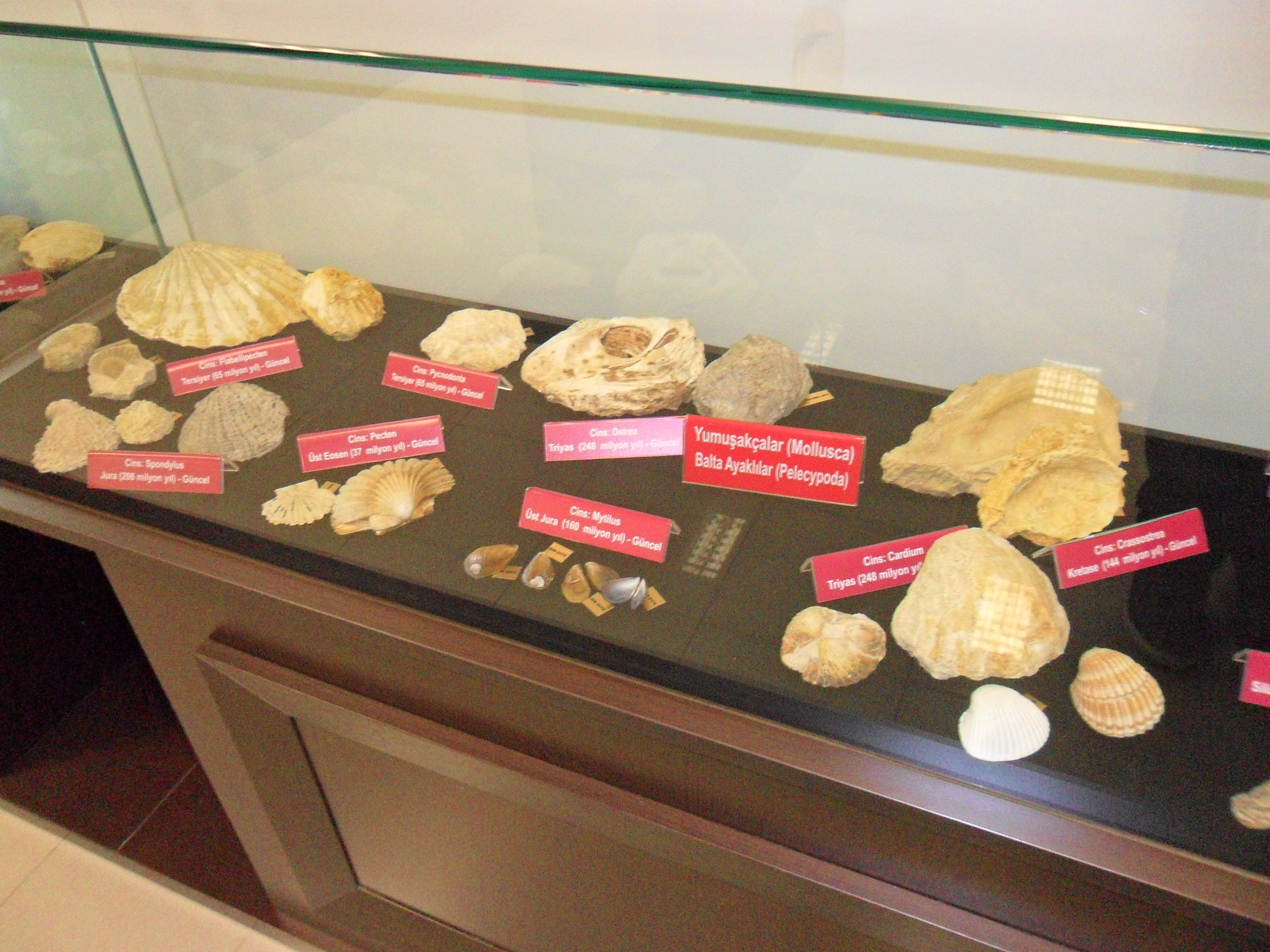
Fossils in Mersin Naval Museum

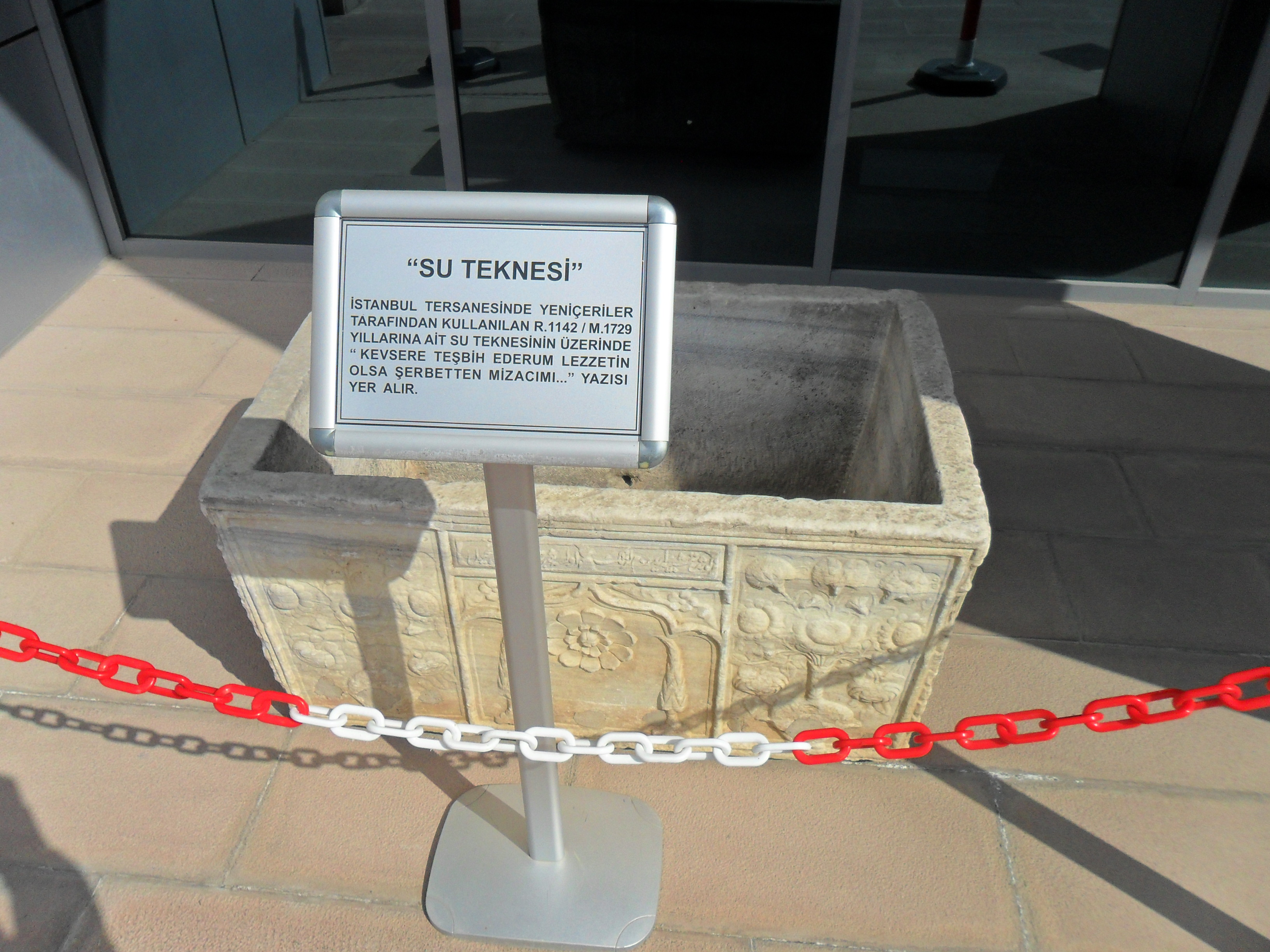
Water trough

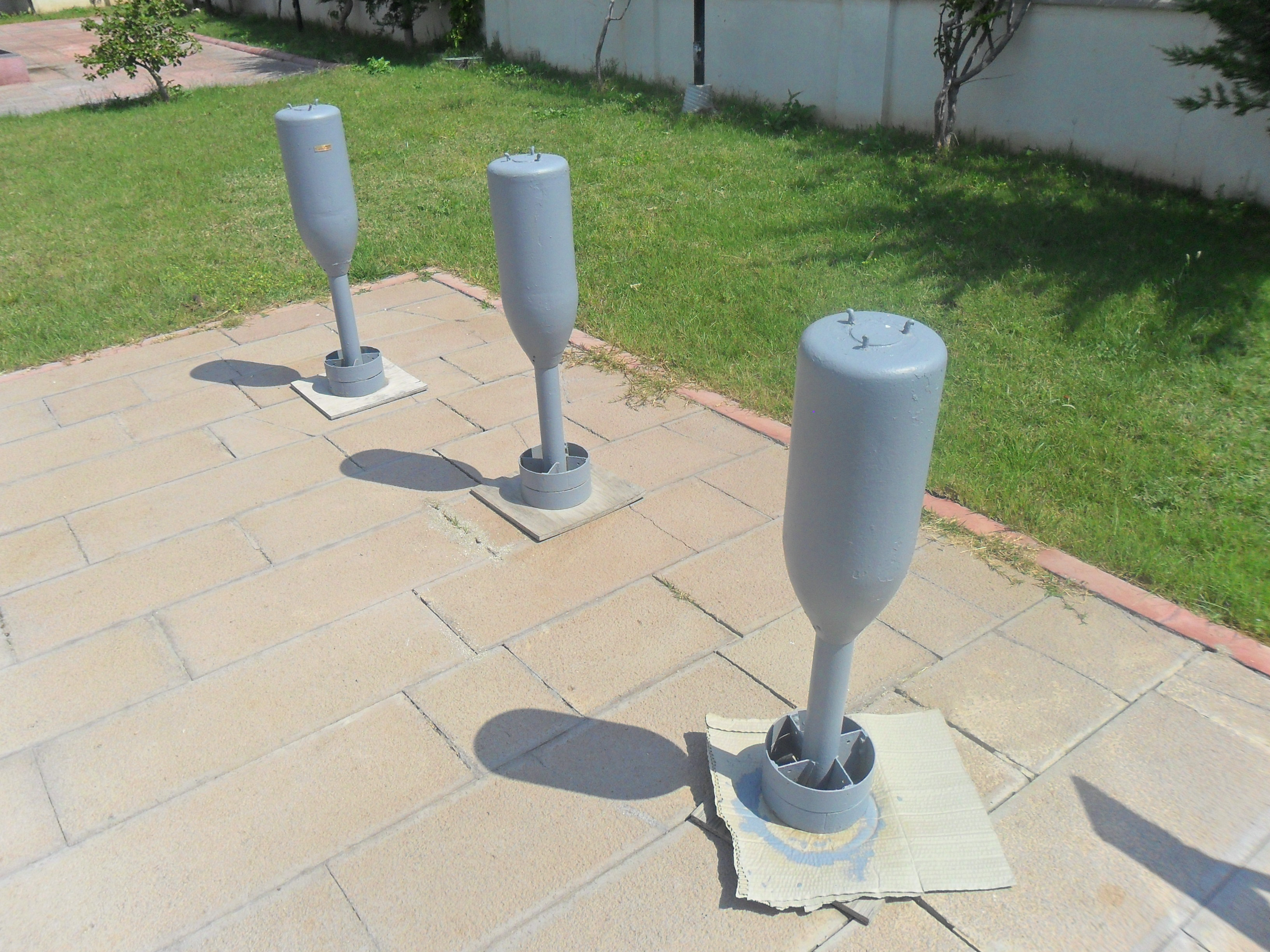
MK 5 DSH rockets

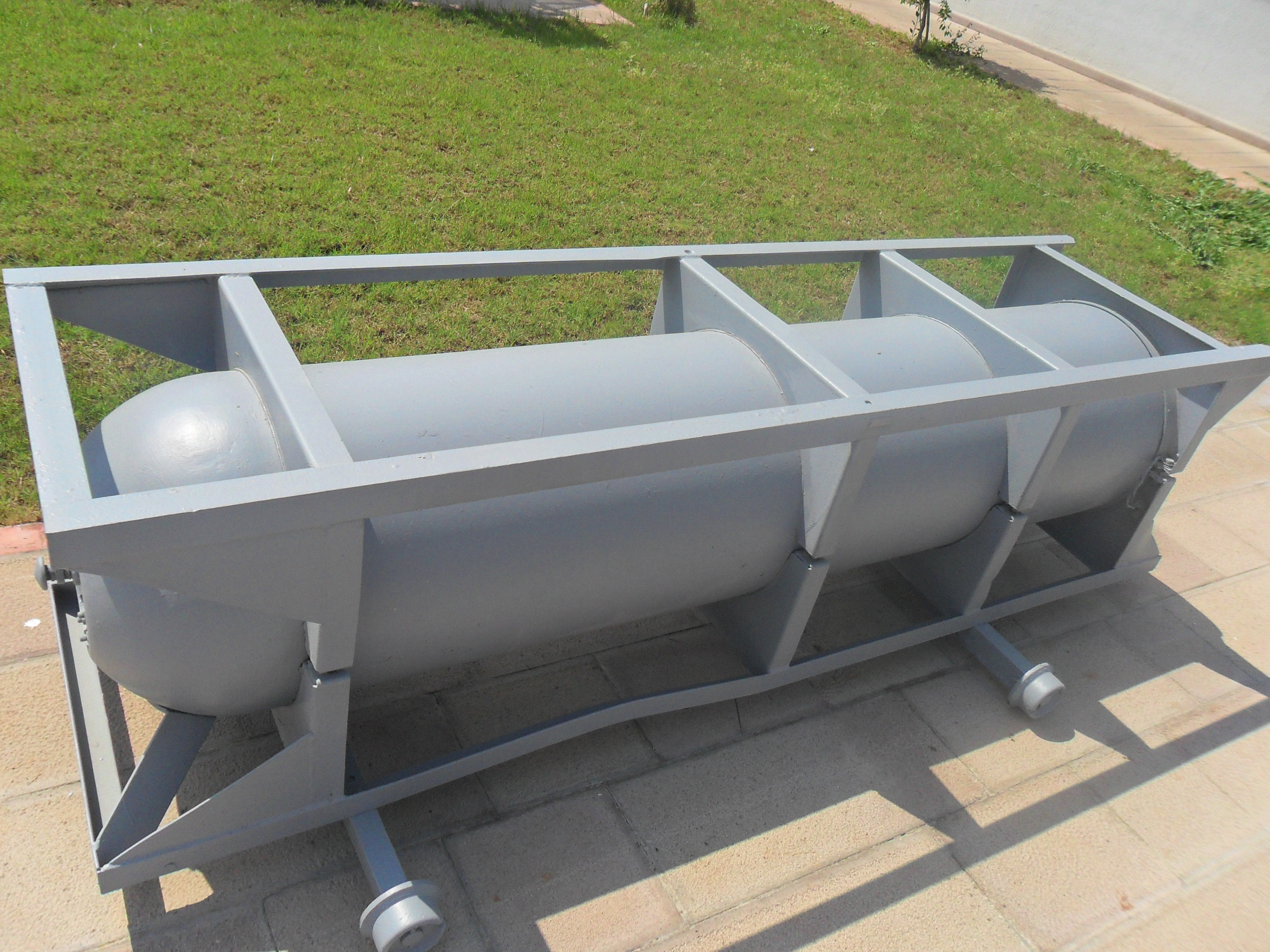
MK 49 Mod 0 bottom mine

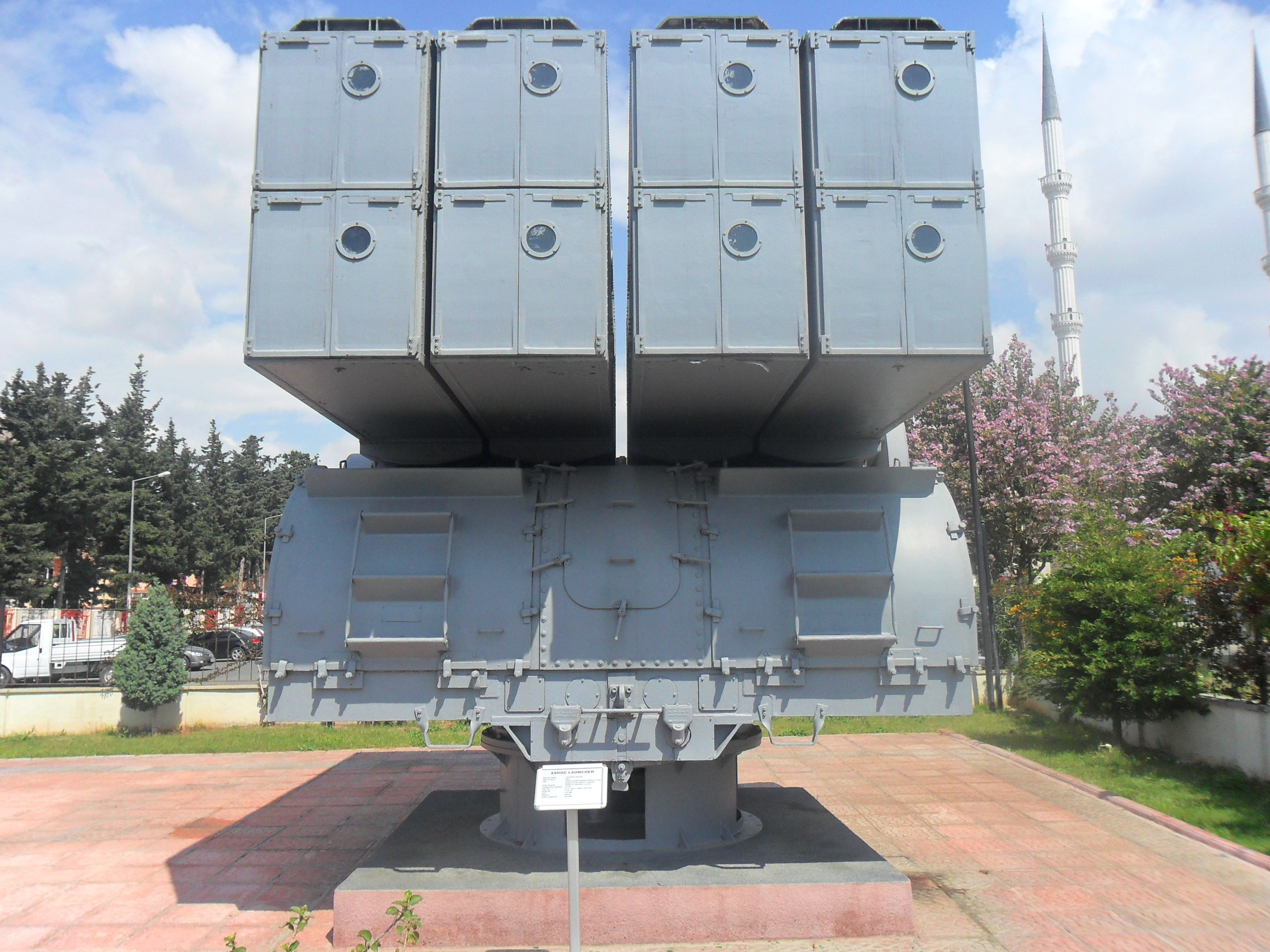
Front view of ASROC launcher

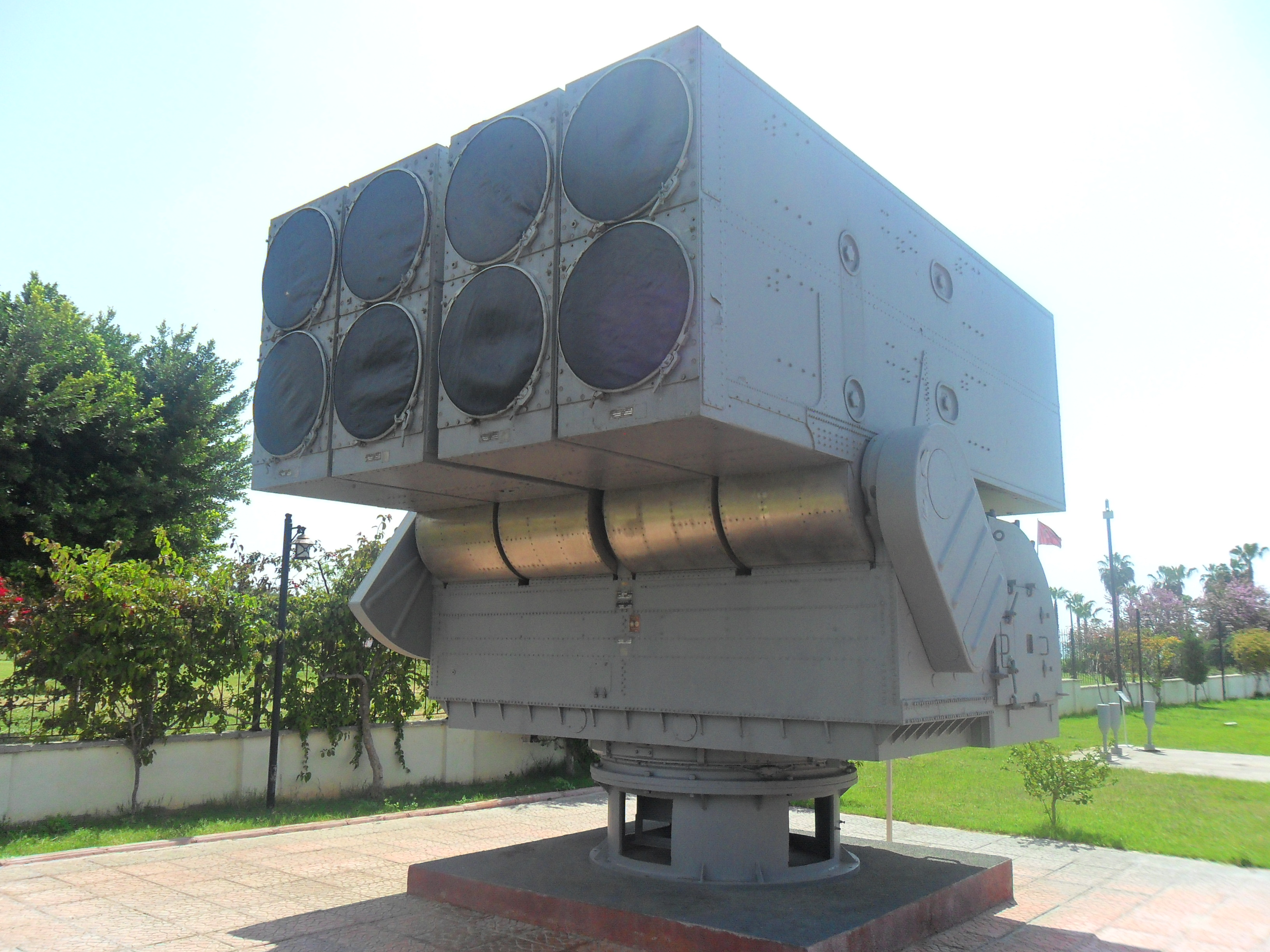
Back view of ASROC launcher

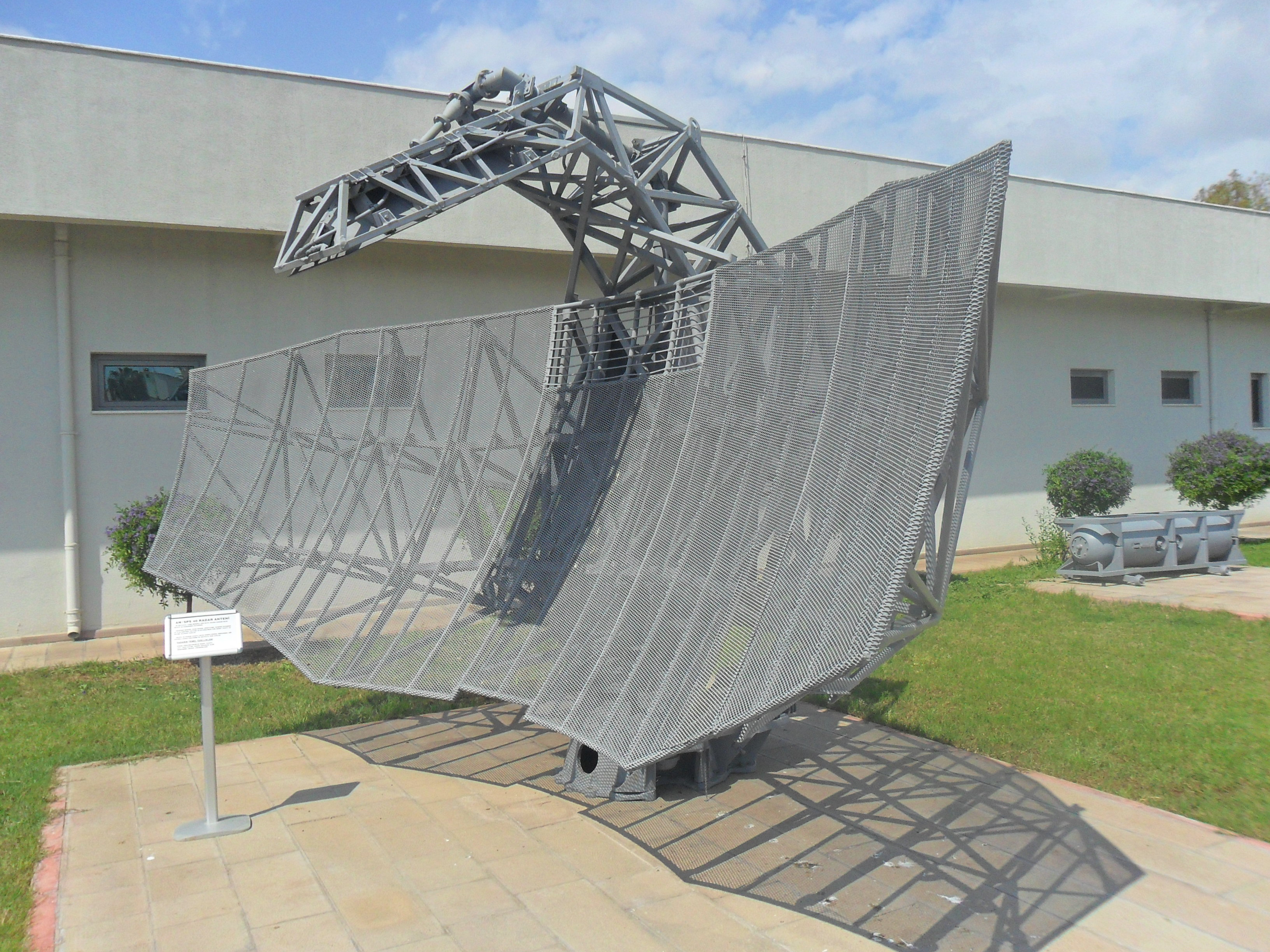
AN-SPS 40 radar antenna

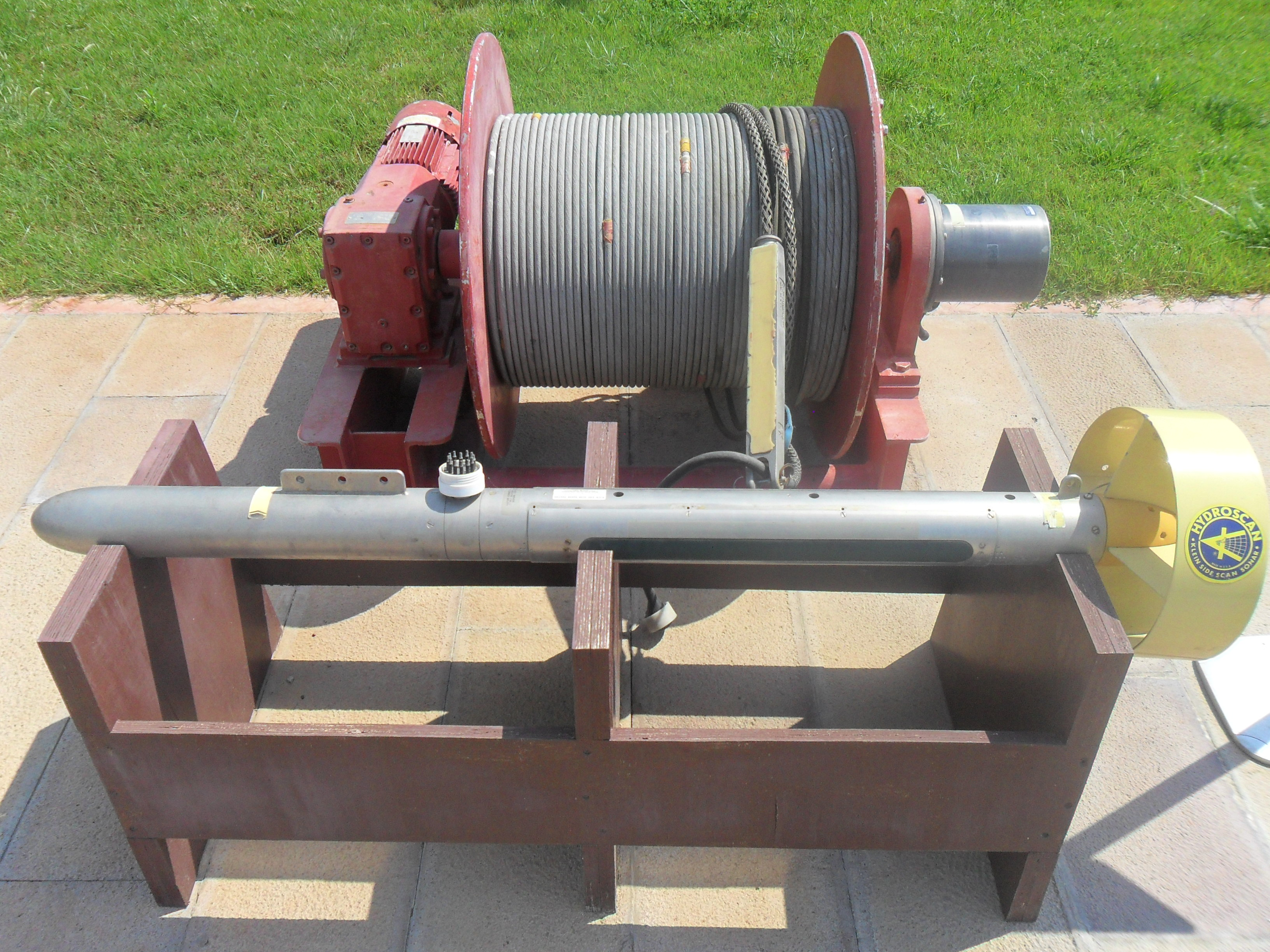
Klein sonar

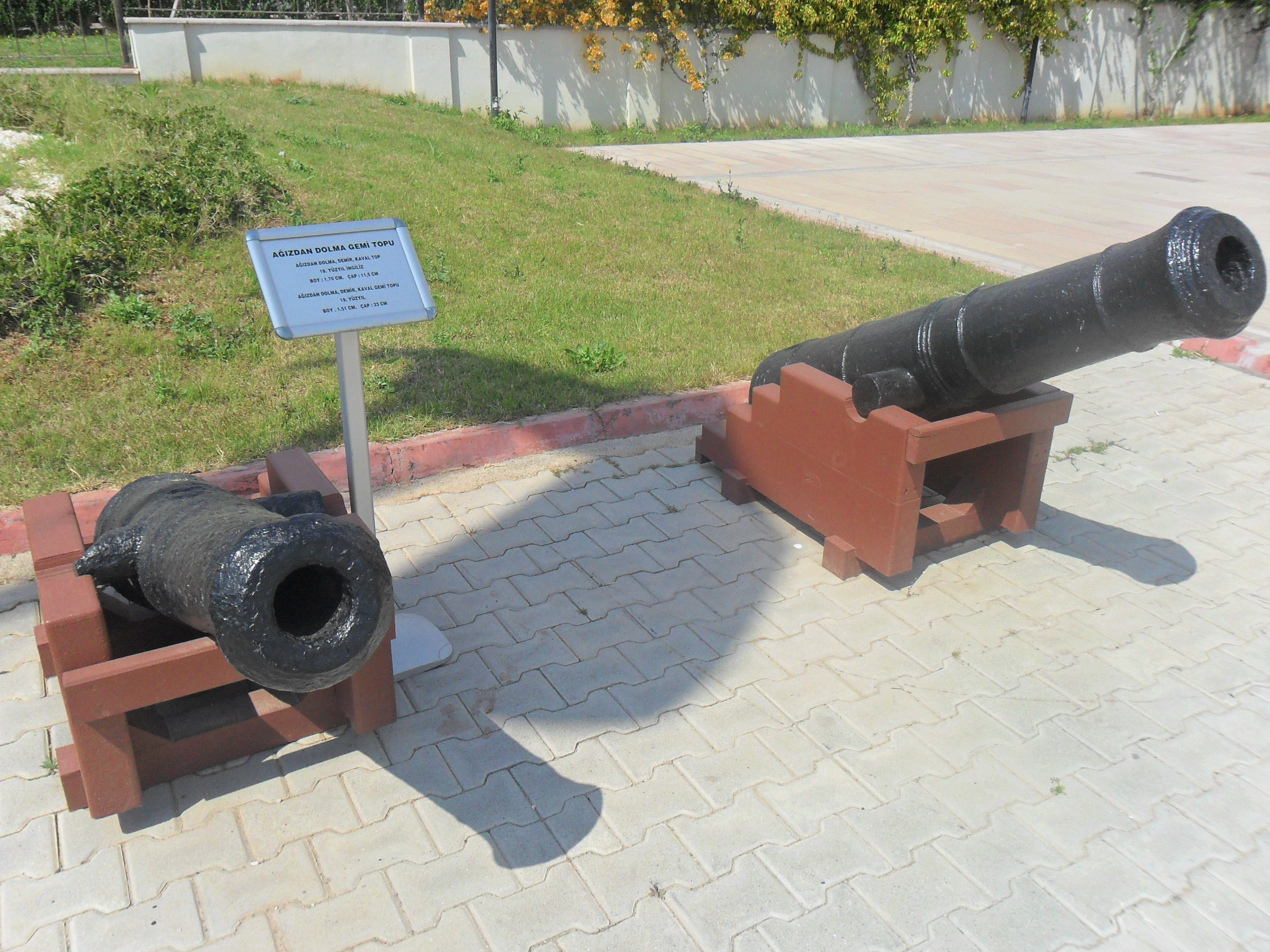
Ship cannons

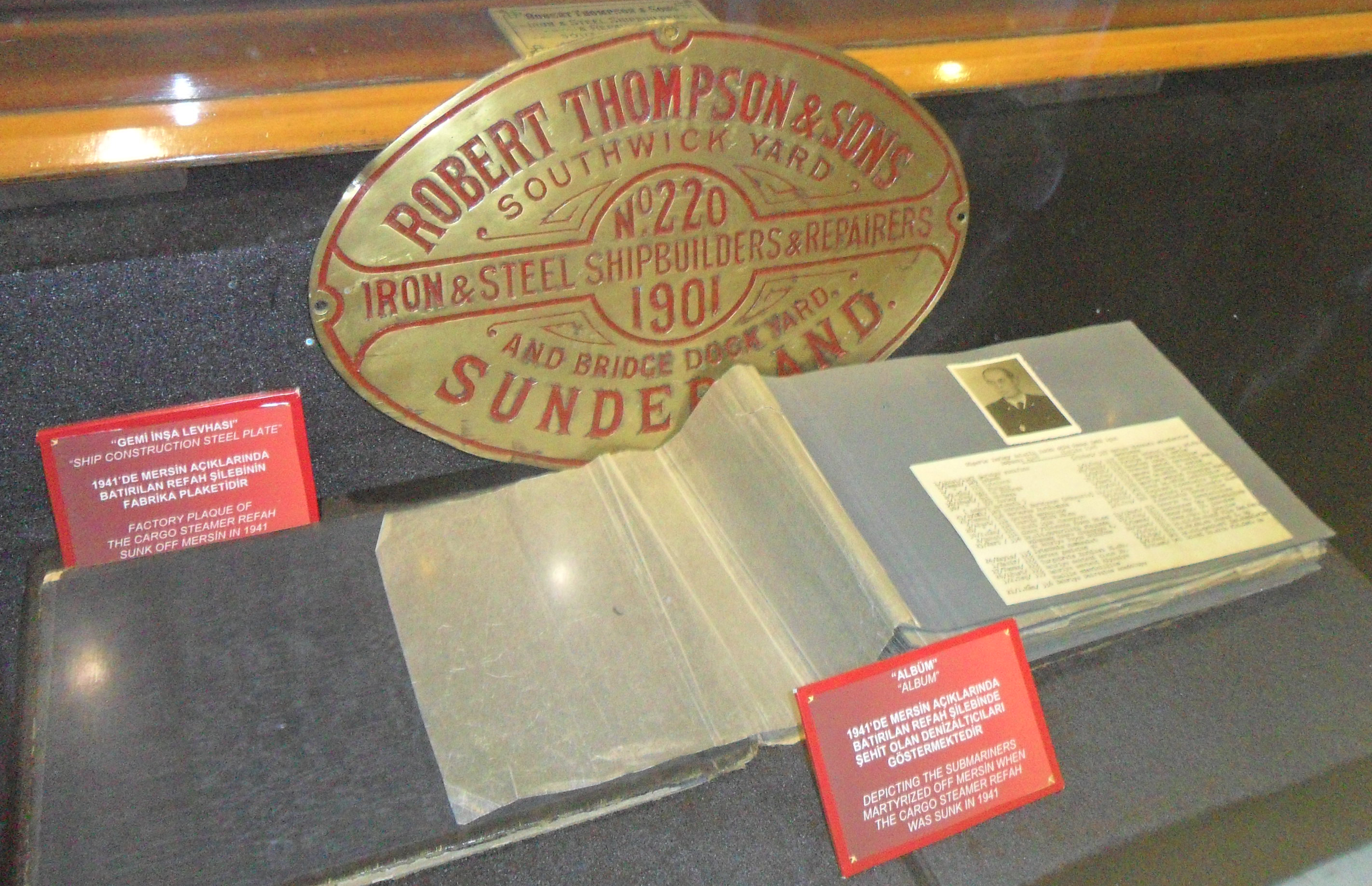
Refah freighter factory plaque and martyrs album

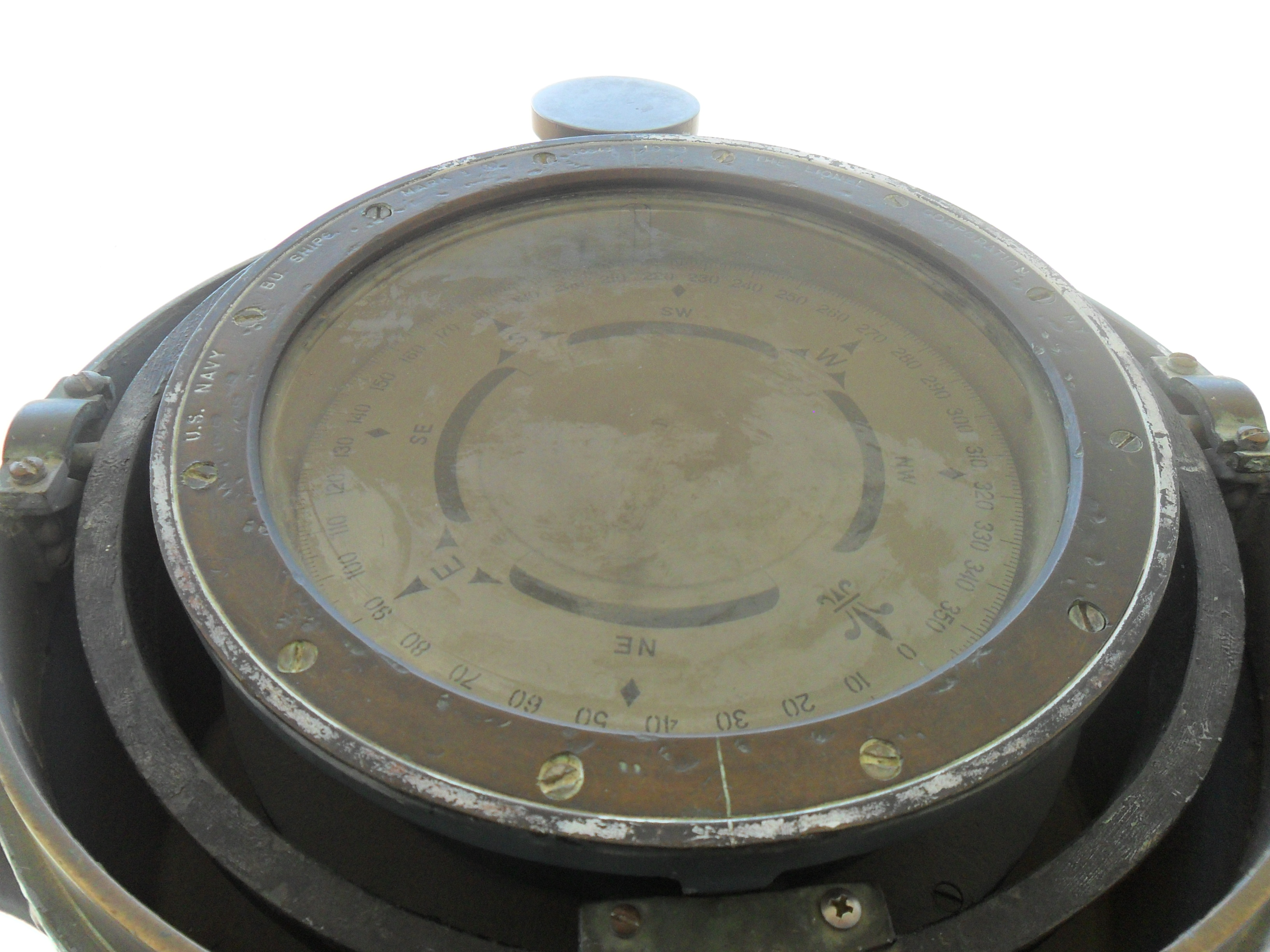
Ship compass detail

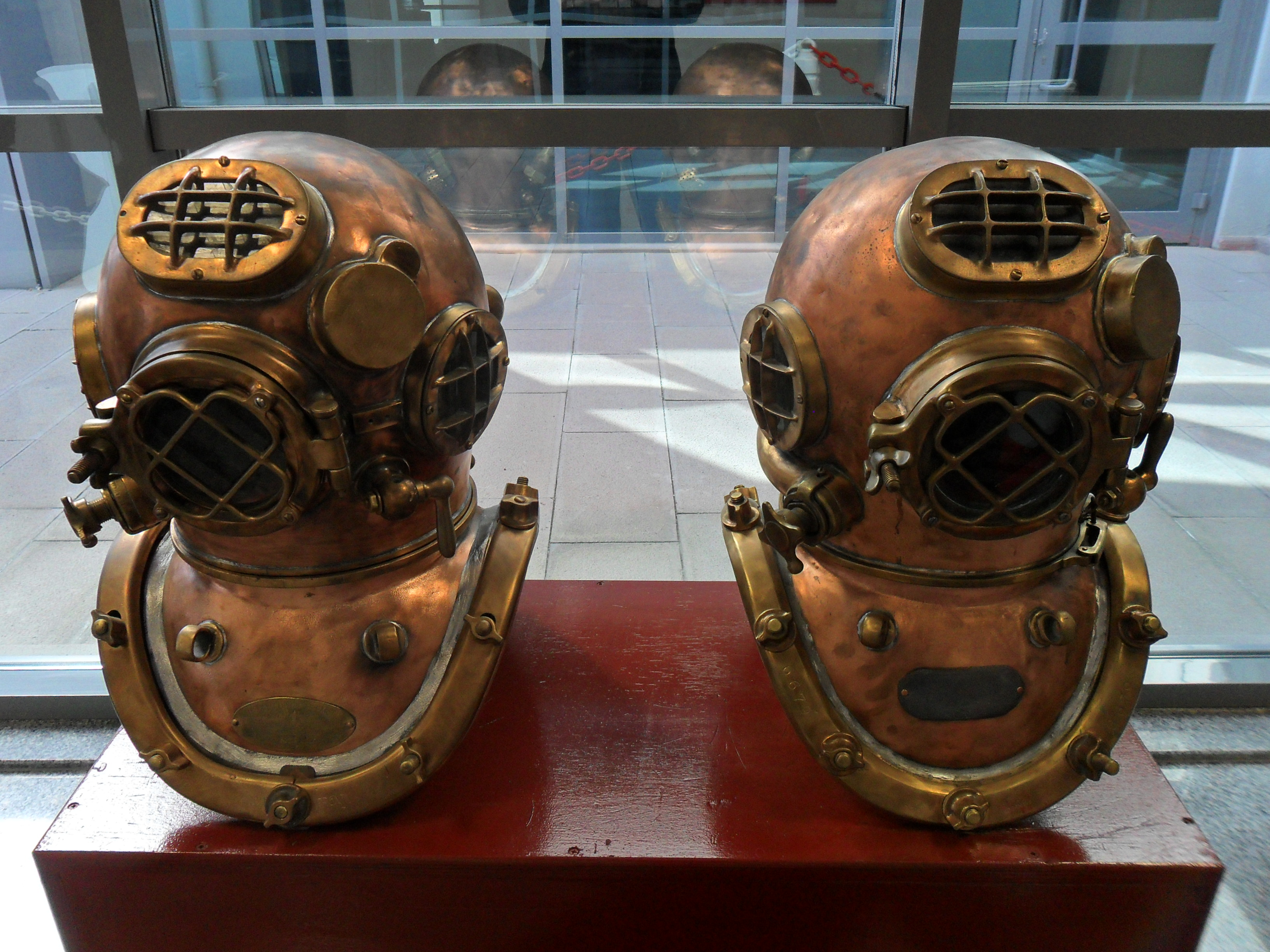
Deep water diving helmets

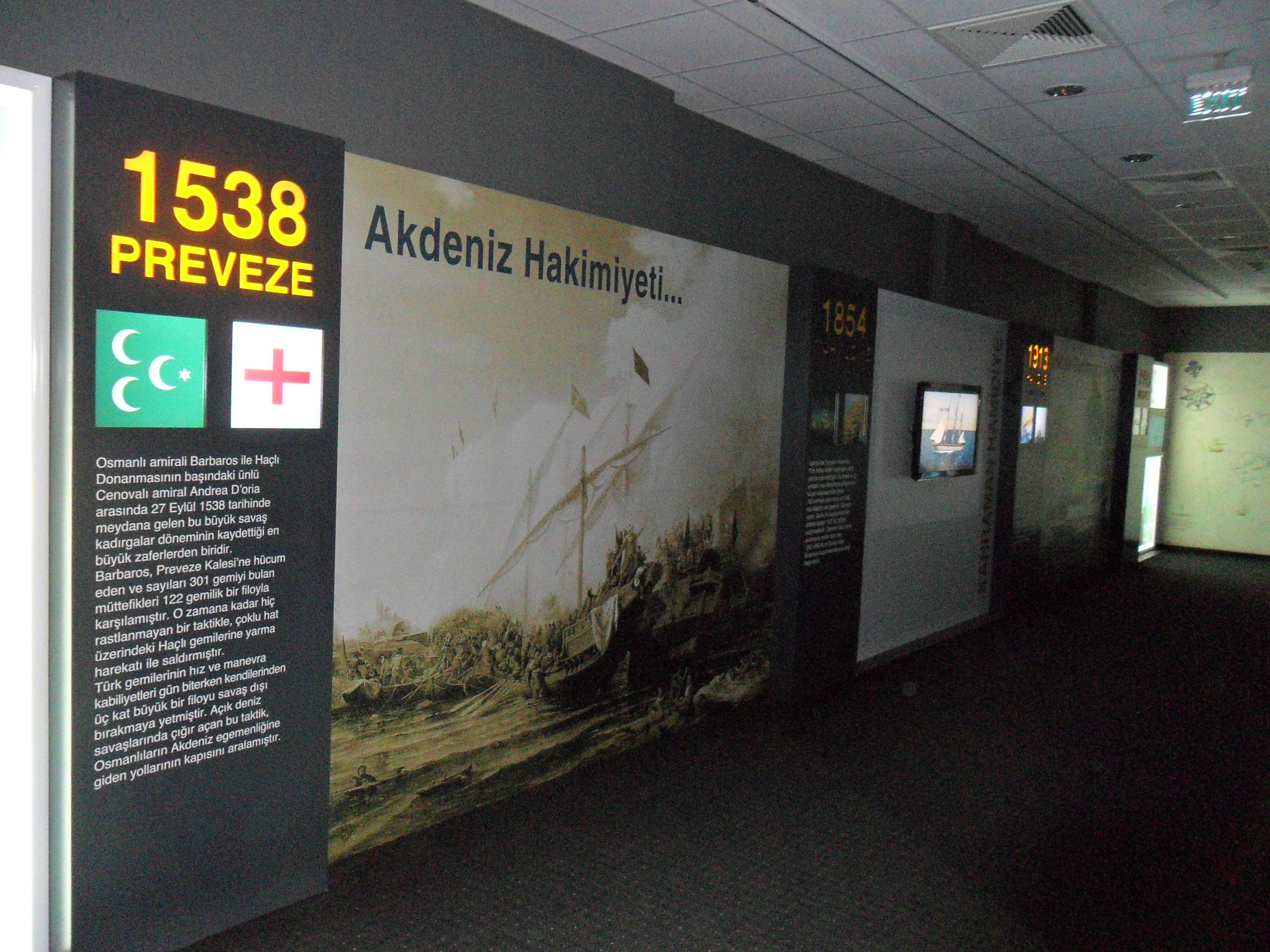
View from interactive sea battles room

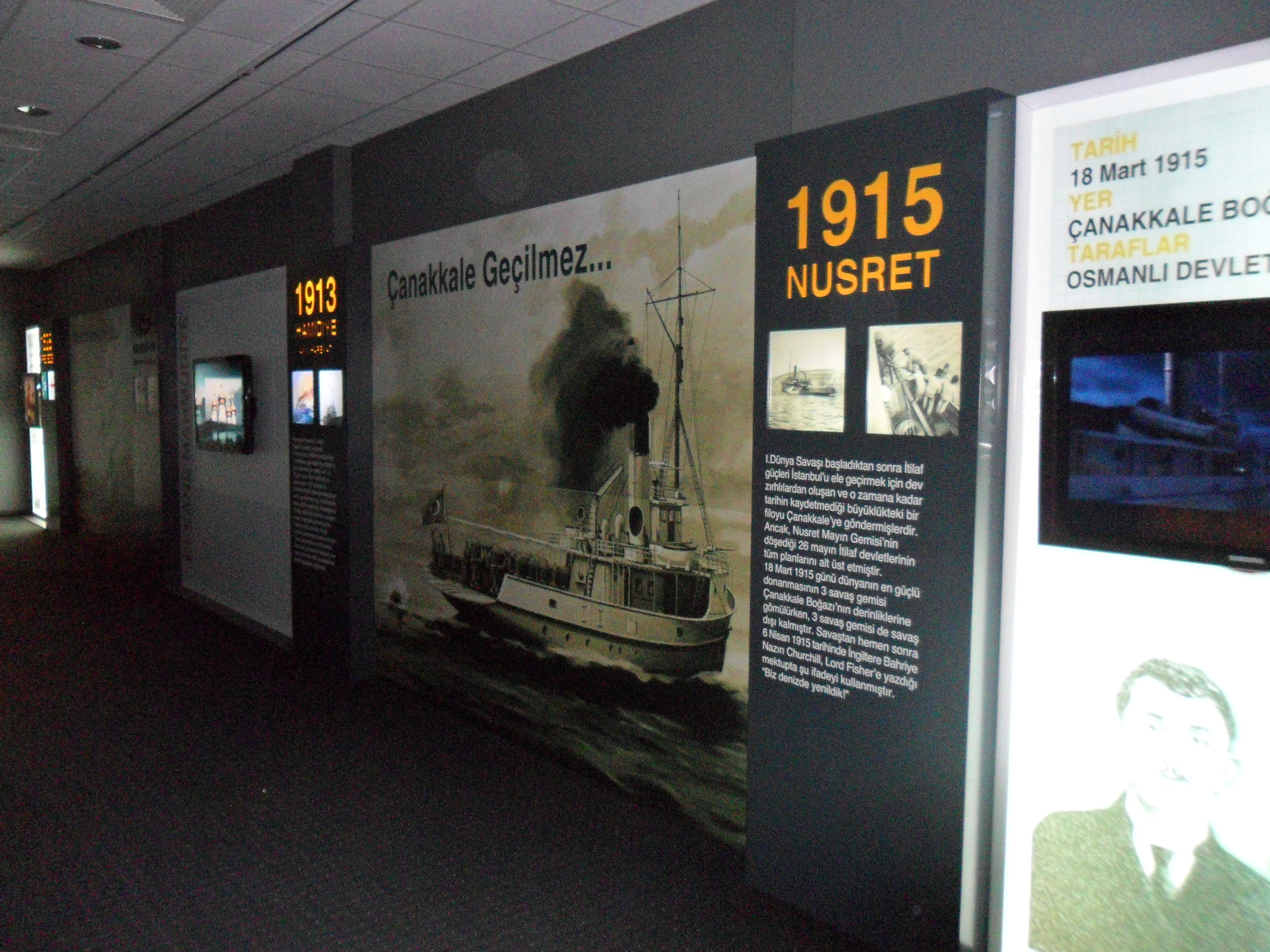
View from interactive sea battles room

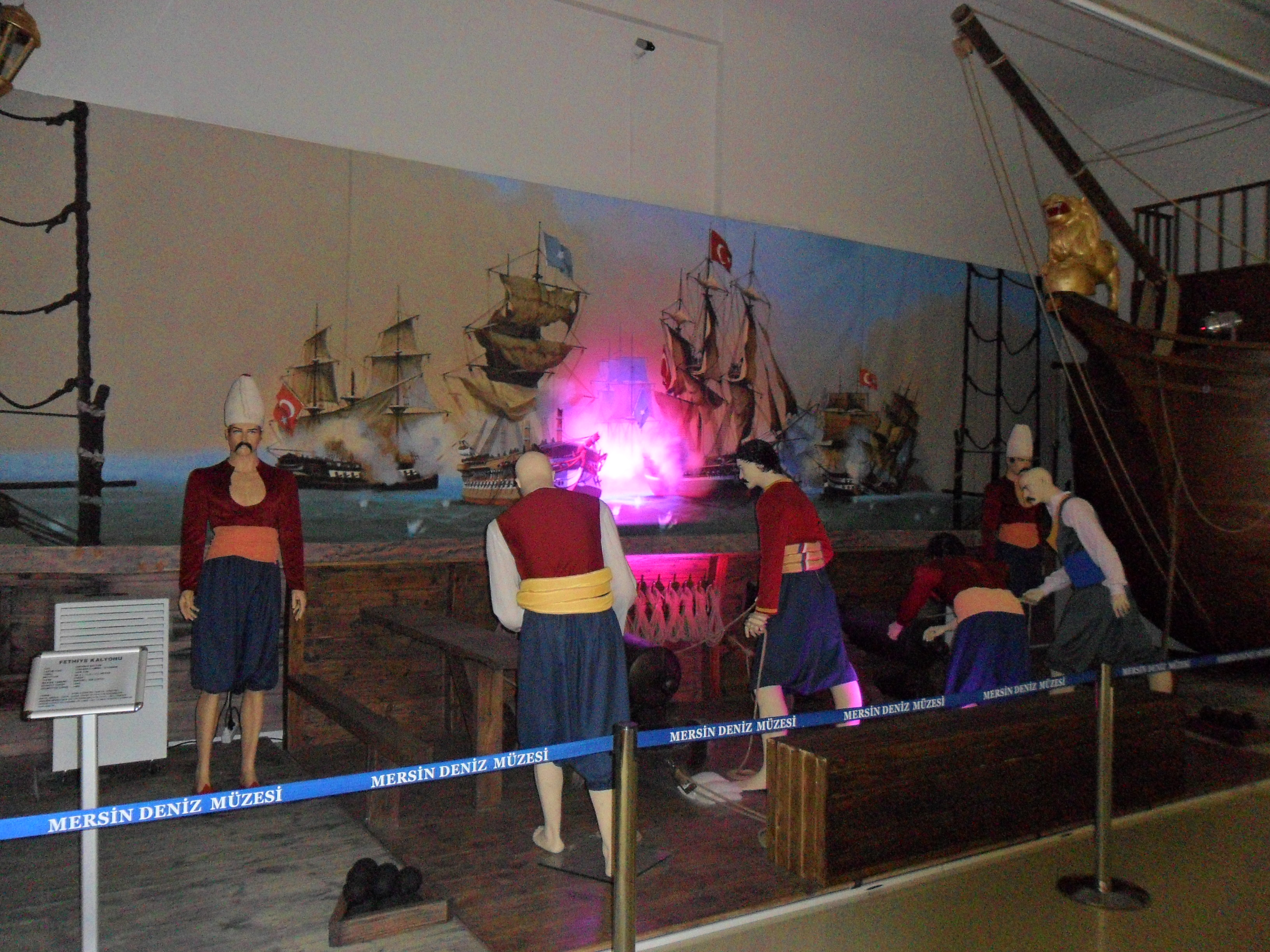
Cannon fire reenactment

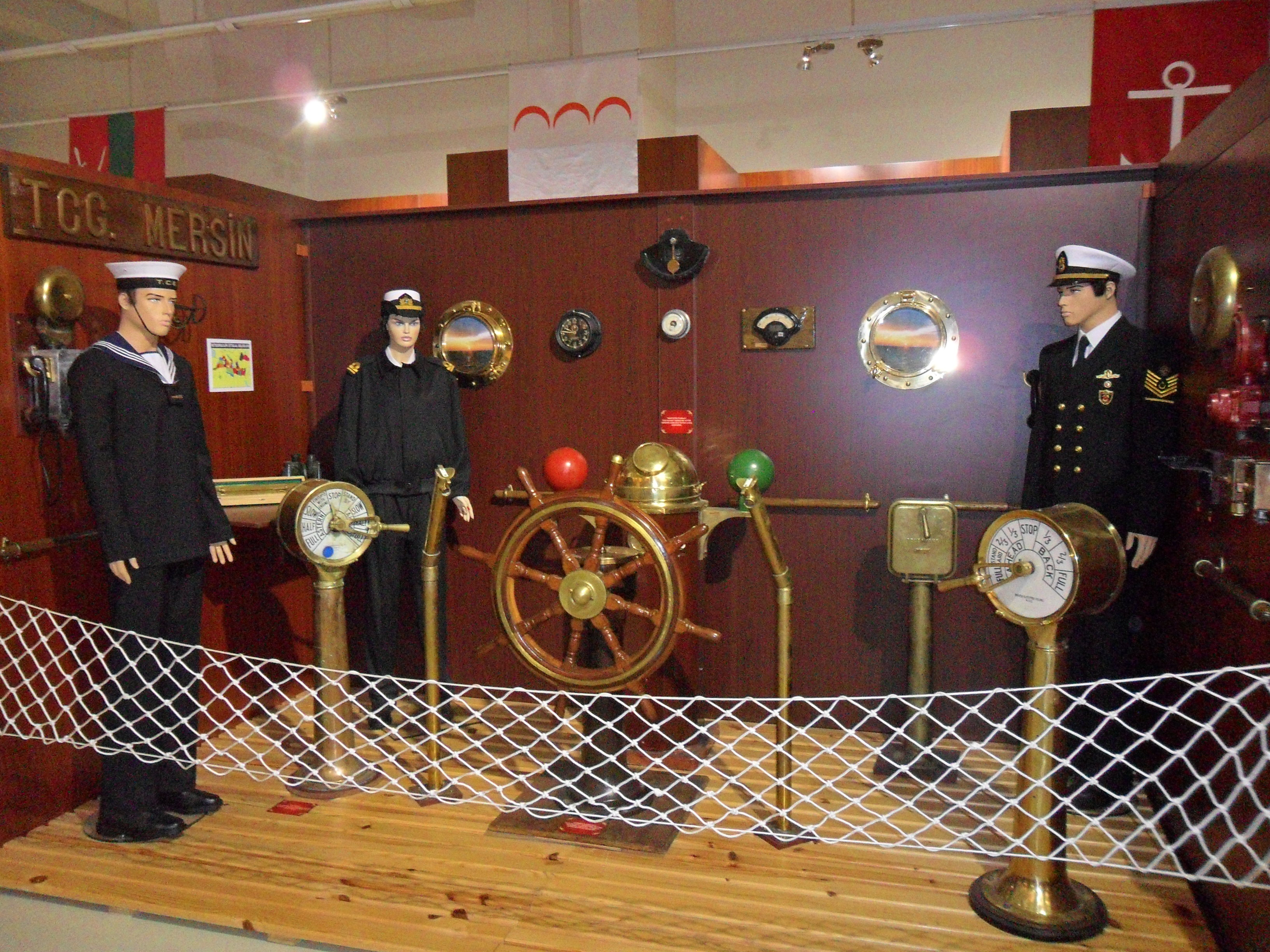
Bridge recreation of an imaginary ship called TCG Mersin

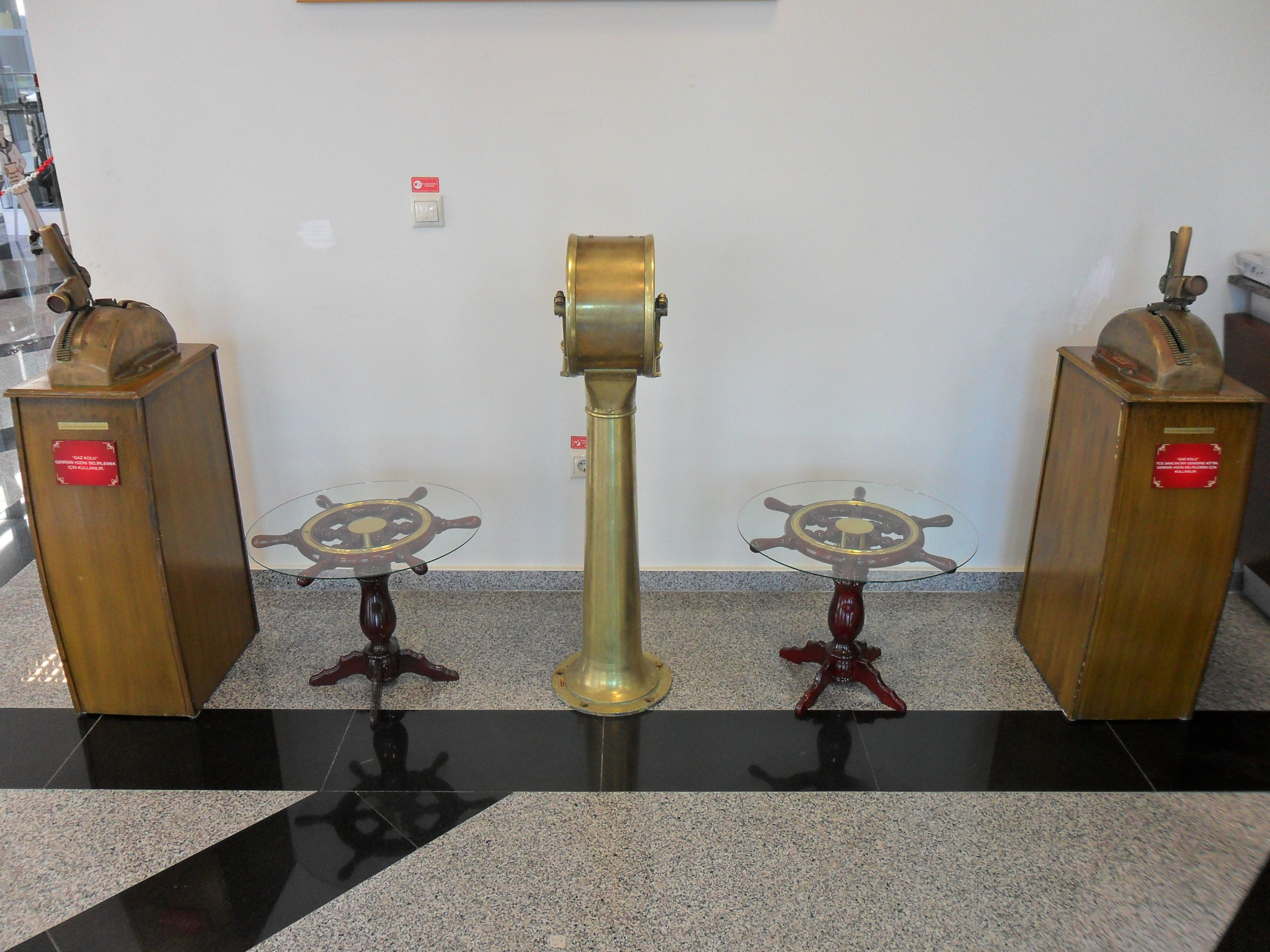
Throttle levers

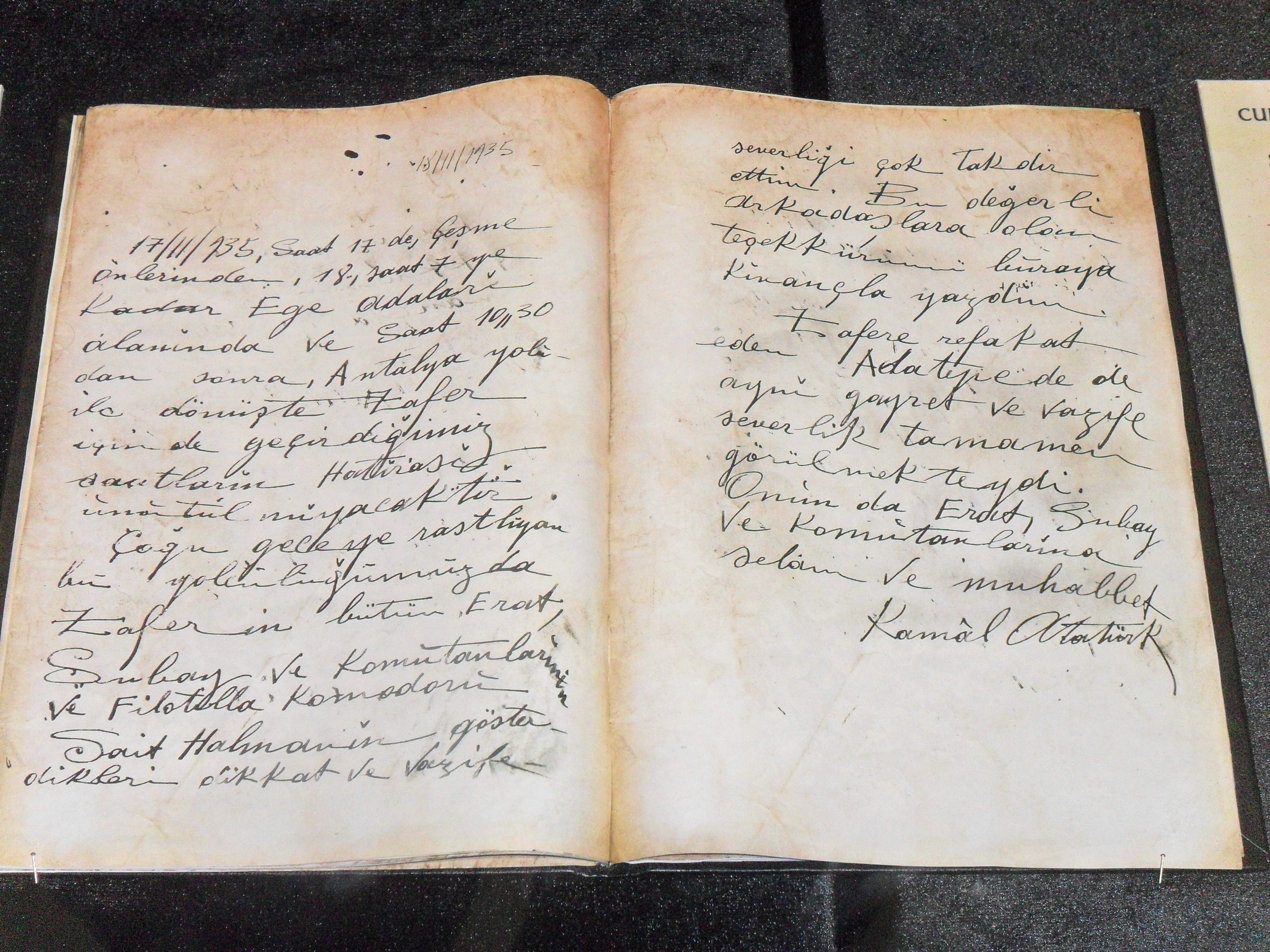
Mustafa Kemal Atatürk's 17 November 1935 memoir entry

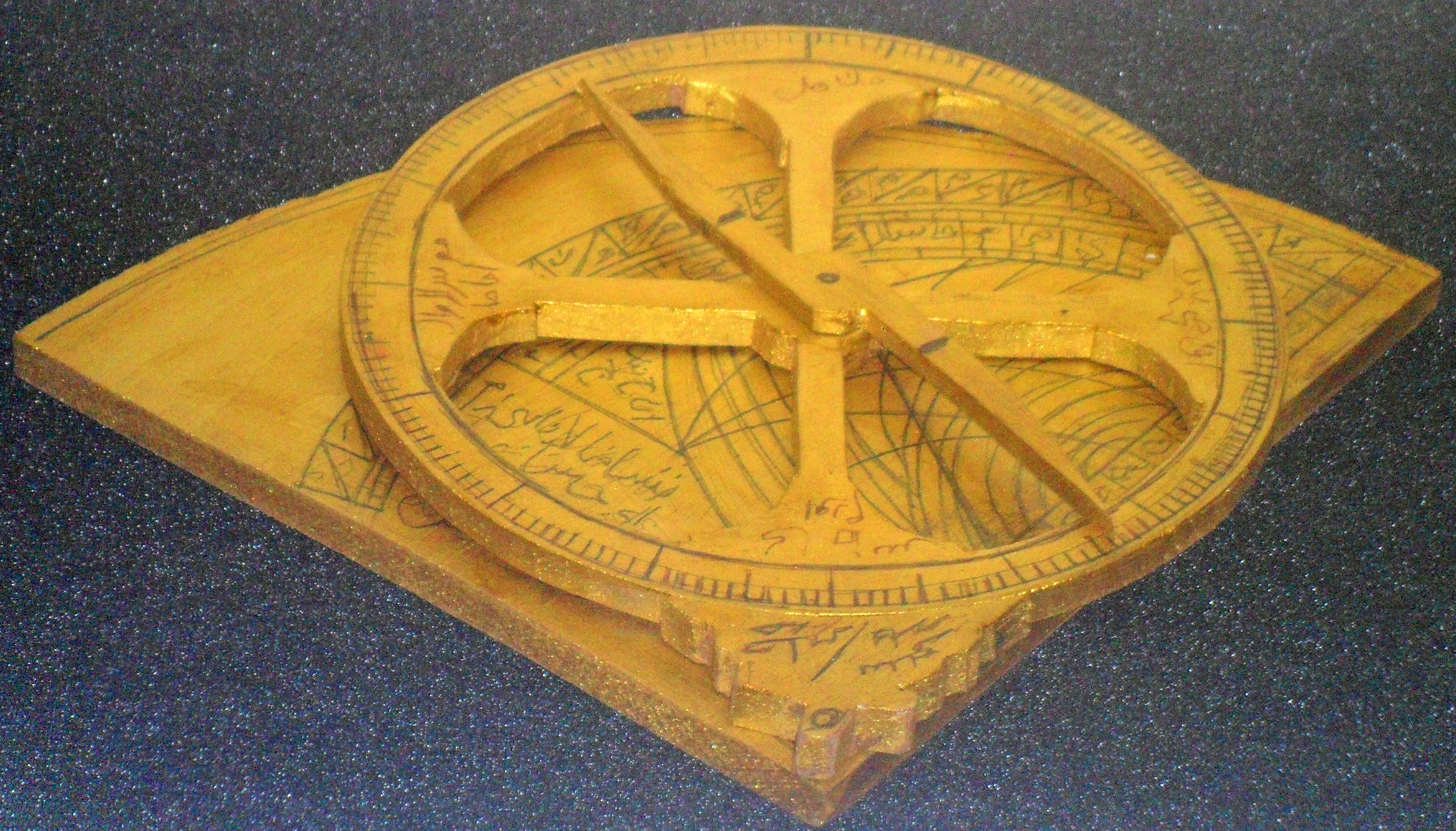
Astrolabe

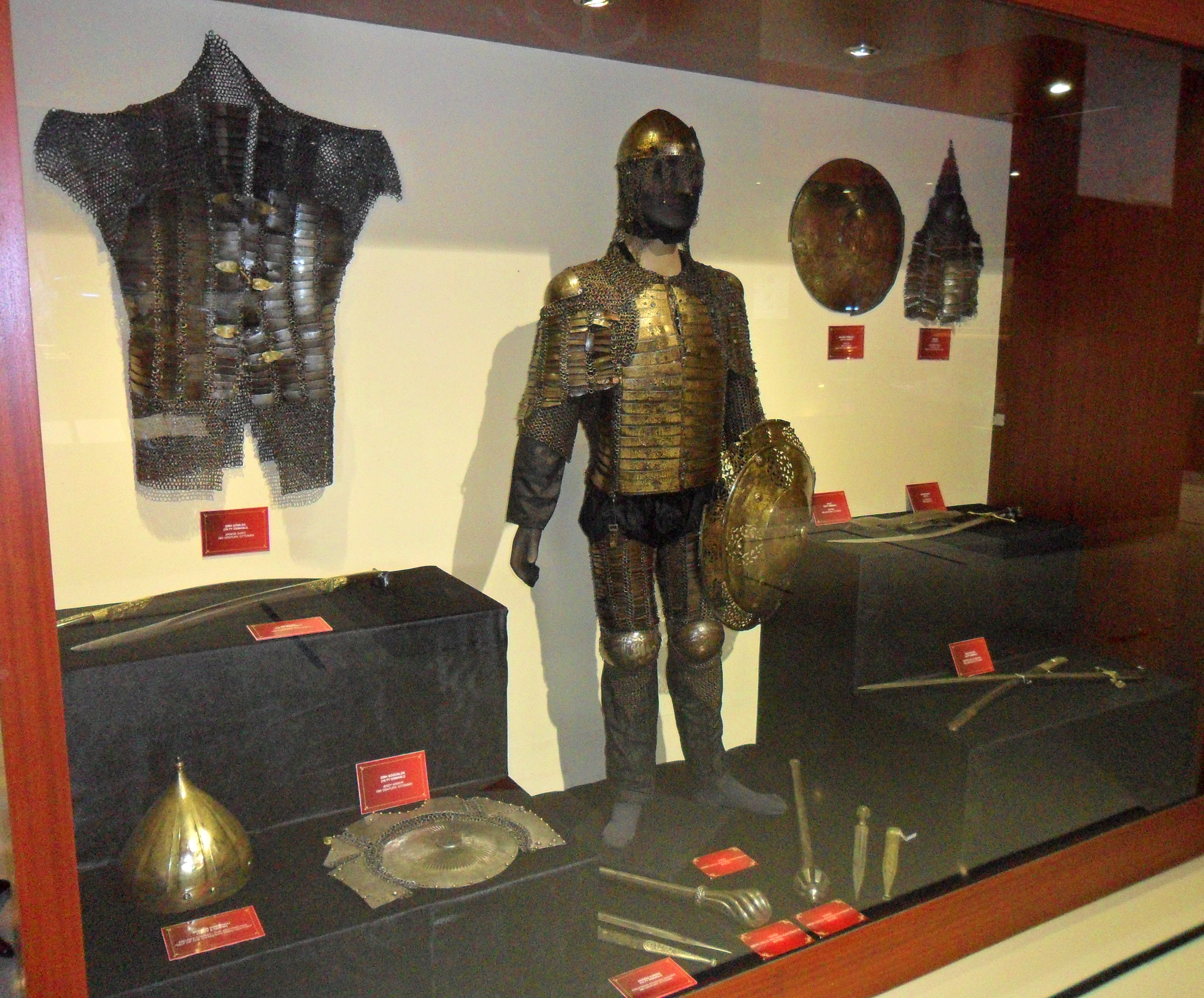
Kayitbay's armor and miscellaneous items

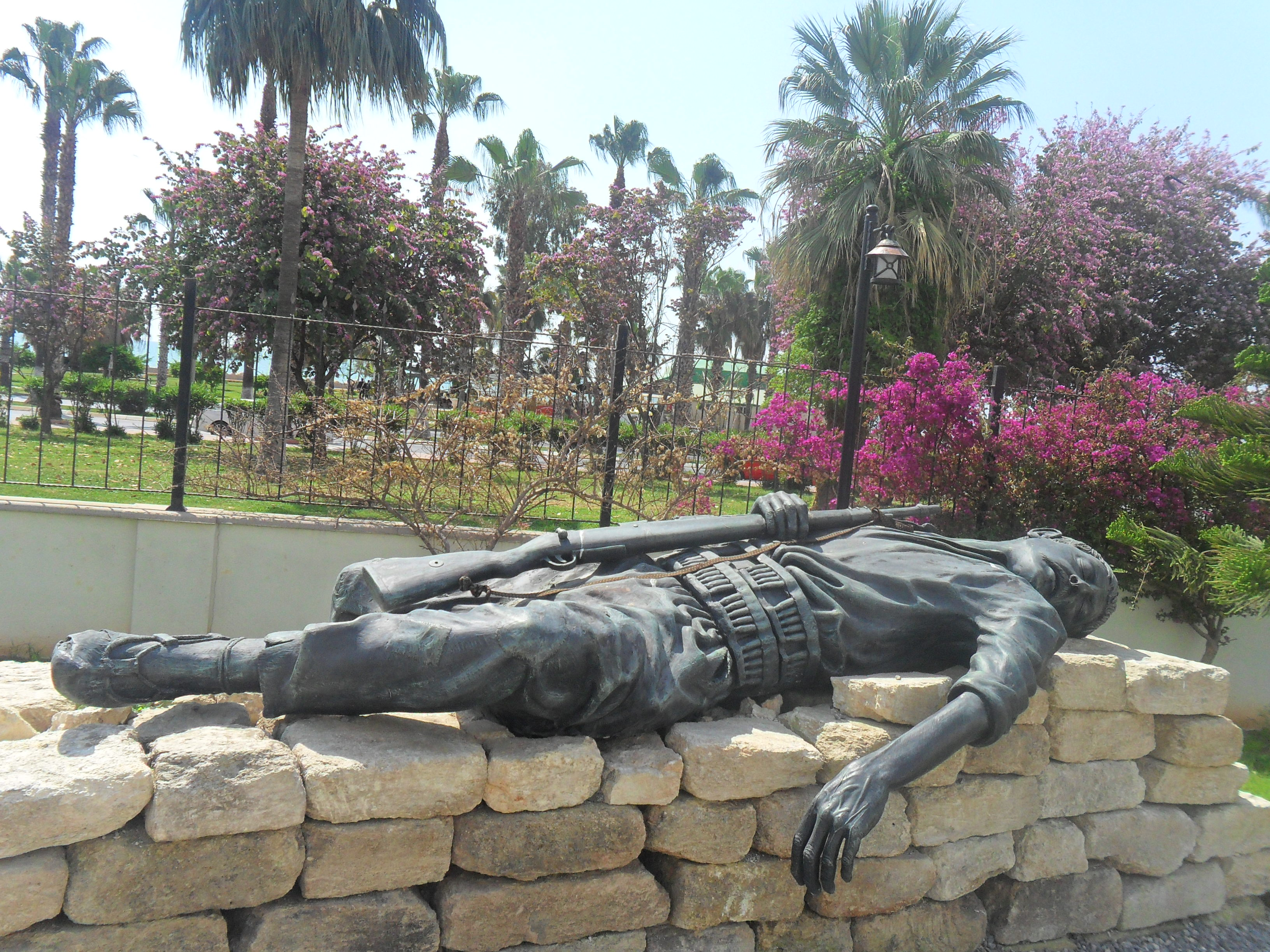
Gozneli Gök Mehmed Monument
