= Miqdad ibn Aswad =

Companion of Muhammad (died c. 652 CE)

al-Miqdad ibn Amr المقداد بن عمرو

Personal life
- Born: 585-6 CE Yemen
- Died: 653-4 CE
- Resting place: Damascus or al Jufr, Medina
- Spouse: Duba'a bint al-Zubayr ibn Abd al-Muttalib
- Children: Abdullah ibn Miqdad; Karimah bint Miqdad
- Era: Rashidun caliphate
- Region: Hejaz, Syria
- Known for: Companion of the Prophet; Transmitter of Hadiths; Pledge of the Tree; Campaigns under Muhammad; Muslim conquest of the Levant; Muslim conquest of Egypt; Muslim conquest of the Maghreb; Conquest of Arwad island; First conquest of Cyprus

Religious life
- Religion: Islam

Al-Miqdad ibn 'Amr ibn Tha'laba (Arabic: المقداد بن عمرو بن ثعلبة, romanized: Miqdād ibn ʿAmr ibn Thaʿlaba), better known as Miqdad ibn al-Aswad al-Kindi (Arabic: المقداد بن الأسود ٱلْكِنْدِيّ, romanized: al-Miqdād ibn al-Aswad al-Kindī) or simply Miqdad, was one of the famous and early companions (saḥābī) of the Islamic prophet Muhammad. His kunya was Abu Ma'bad (Arabic: أبو معبد). Miqdad was born in Yemen, and after becoming a fugitive in his hometown he fled to Mecca, where he served al-Aswad al-Kindi. Miqdad managed to gain favor of his master, who in turn adopted him as his son. Al-Miqdad later embraced Islam and became one of the early converts of Islam, and per Abd Allah ibn Mas'ud, one of the first seven to publicly announce their conversion to Islam. He was one of the Muhajirun, the Muslims who migrated to Medina due to the persecution they faced by Meccan polytheists. In Medina, Miqdad was known in history as the first Muslim horseman, and he participated in all military campaigns under Muhammad.

After the death of the prophet Muhammad, as before, Miqdad was a close associate of Ali, the Prophet's cousin, and continued to serve Islam under the Rashidun, where he was involved heavily in the Muslim conquest of the Levant and later Muslim conquest of Egypt. In Shia Islam, it is believed that he was a member of Shurṭat al-Khamīs, a group of six thousand fighters who swore absolute loyalty to Ali.

Al-Miqdad's appearance was recorded as dark and hairy, with a dyed beard, wide eyes and a hooked nose. He was known as an excellent archer. Miqdad was known to have had a very large stomach, to the point that once he sat near a huge golden chest, and people remarked that the build of Miqdad was larger than the goldsmith's chest. In Medina, al-Miqdad stopped using "Ibn al-Aswad" as his name and used his real bloodline nisba (patronymic) going back to his father ("Ibn 'Amr"), after a Qur'anic verse was revealed forbidding the abolishment of one's bloodline.

== Biography ==
Miqdad was born in Hadhramaut, Yemen to Amr al-Bahrani. He left for Mecca after an incident between him and one of the fellow tribesmen namely Abu Shammar ibn Hajar al-Kindi caused him to become fugitive and run away from his home to Mecca. In Mecca, he served a man named al-Aswad ibn Abd al-Yaghuts al-Kindi, who several times impressed his master and caused al-Aswad to grant favor on him and later adopted him as son, thus caused Miqdad to be more known as al-Miqdad ibn Aswad al-Kindi rather than al-Miqdad ibn Amr.

=== Under Muhammad ===
When Muhammad began the religion of Islam, Miqdad was among the first seven people who converted although he hid his new faith from Aswad ibn Abd al-Yaghuts. He later performed the migration to Medina with fellow Muslims to escape the persecutions from the Quraysh. When the Muslims migrated to Medina, Miqdad and Utba ibn Ghazwan pretended to follow the Meccan polytheists in their effort to chase the Muslims. However, as they caught up with a group of Muslim Muhajirs who escaped Mecca, Miqdad and Utbah immediately broke up with the Meccan and instead joined the Muslims in their escape to Medina.

One source says that in the battle of Badr Miqdad was the only Muslim who rode a horse, the others were on camels or on foot. Miqdad commanded the left flank of the Muslim army during this battle. Another source says that at least three Muslims were on horseback: Miqdad, Zubayr ibn al-Awwam, and Marthad ibn abi Marthad. Before the battle Miqdad said to Muhammad:

O messenger of Allah! go ahead with what you were ordered to. We are with you. I swear by Allah we will never do as Bani Israel did to Moses and say, 'Go with your God and fight. We will stay here. We will tell you, 'Go with Allah and fight. We are with you!' I swear by Allah, the One who sent you as Prophet on the right path; even if you lead us to Bark al-Ghimad, we will fight along with you until you reach it

There is a hadith that says that after the battle of Badr, Miqdad and Zubayr both received double the normal soldier's spoils of war for riding horses. (Note: The hadith were included in record of Ibn Manzur record of Miqdad ibn Aswad biography in his book, brief history of Damascus)

Later, in the battle of Uhud, he was said to have been an archer Later in the battle of Dhu Qarad when Banu Ghatafan under Abdurrahman al-Faraji came to raid Medina, he along with Akhram and Abu Qatadah fought against Abdurrahman al-Faraji. Akhram died in this battle but Miqdad and Abu Qatada manage to win the battle and caused the army of Abdurrahman to flee. This is also stated in Waqidi Kitabul Maghazi Miqdad was in all of Muhammad's battles.

He married Duba'ah bint Zubayr, one of Muhammad's relatives.

=== During the Caliphate of Umar ===
During the first siege of Emesa Miqdad participated as commander of Bali tribe division. Miqdad was known to have participated in this siege under Abu Ubaidah ibn al-Jarrah. During the campaign in Levant, Miqdad also served as Quran reciter of the army of Rashidun caliph Abu Bakr This tradition was recorded to be continued on to the time of caliph Umar in battle of Yarmouk, where Miqdad was tasked by Khalid bin al-Walid to recite Quranic verses from Al-Anfal to the rear guards which were led by Said ibn Zayd to boost their morale before the battle Miqdad then was sent by caliph Umar to Egypt during the Muslim conquest of Egypt to aid 'Amr ibn al As as the latter asked for reinforcements, where caliph Umar praised Miqdad in his letter to Amr that Miqdad being equal to 1,000 soldiers in strength

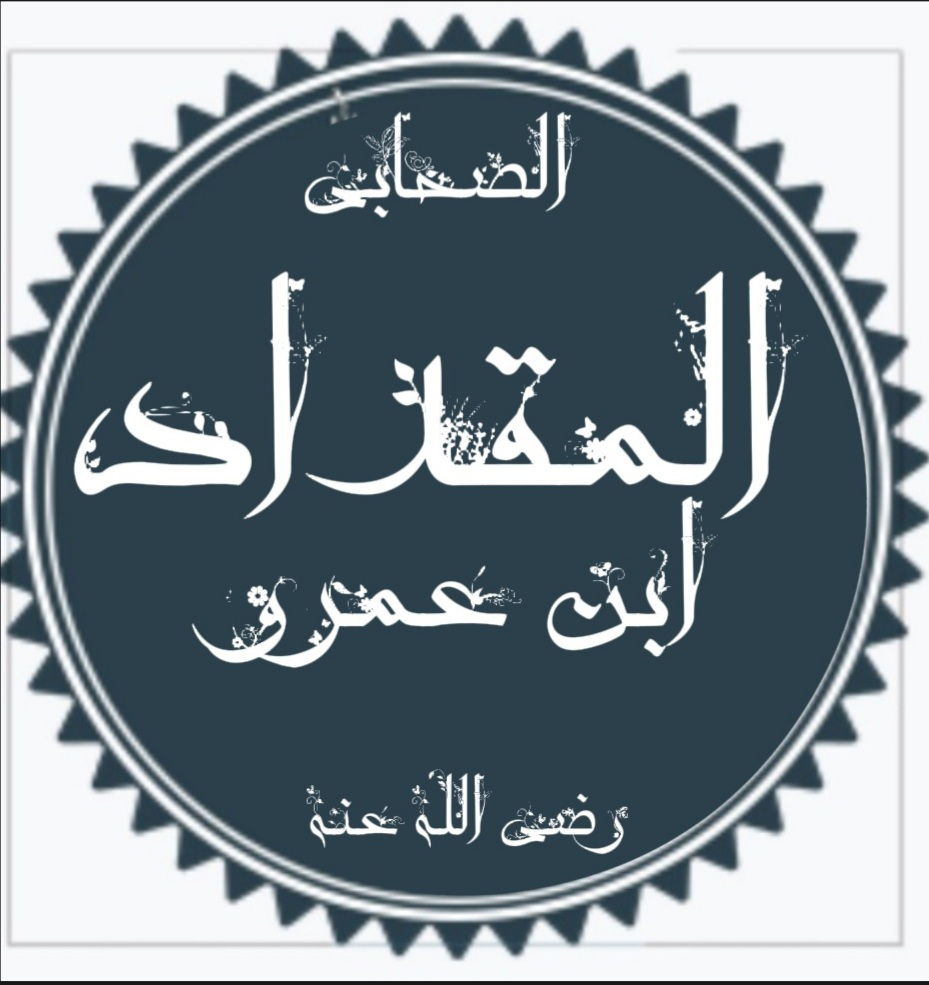

According to Waqidi, during Miqdad's campaign aiding Amr, the Rashidun under Miqdad pacified several areas in al-Gharbia region, starting from Kafr Tanah (area in modern day Dakahlia Governorate), and Tennis. Then Miqdad continued his march leading forty horsemen which included Dhiraar ibn al-Azwar. Then as they reached Damietta, Miqdad found the city was fortified by a man named al-Hammuk, an uncle of Al-Muqawqis. Al-Hammuk fortified the city and closed the gates, as Miqdad besieged the city. As Damietta subdued, Miqdad were appointed to govern the city. The siege continued until the defender of Damietta, Shata, the son of Hammuk, agreed to surrender and converted to Islam. (Note: According to one account, the army which was brought by Miqdad to capture Damietta and lake Burullus amounted 80,000 personnel.) As Shata now converted to Islam, Miqdad now appointed him to lead the army to conquer the province of Sah, the fortresses in Ashmoun, Lake Burullus, and Dumayra. However, Shata later fell in battle during the capture of Tina castle.

Later, during the siege of Oxyrhynchus in south of Egypt, Miqdad, Zubayr ibn al-Awwam, Dhiraar ibn al-Azwar and others, leading about 10,000 Companions of the Prophet, with 70 among them were veterans of battle of Badr. They besieged the city for 4 months as Miqdad leading 200 horsemen, while Zubayr ibn Al-Awwam lead 300 horsemen, then Dhiraar, Abdullah ibn Umar, and Uqba ibn Amir al-Juhani each leading 200 horsemen. the Byzantines and their Copt allies showering the Rashidun army, until the overcame the defenders, as Dhiraar, the first emerge, came out from the battle with his entire body covered in blood, while confessed he has slayed about 160 Byzantine soldiers during the battle. Then, the city of Oxyrhyncuhus was renamed into "al-Bahnasa" after being subdued by Rashidun army.

At some point during Umar's reign, when Miqdad in Medina, along with Zubayr, and the caliph's son, Abdullah ibn Umar, went to Khaybar to collect their profit share as they have shareholding of the properties and plantations in Khaybar, which were managed and worked by the Jewish tribes of Khaybar, who had been subdued during the time of Muhammad. However, the Jews in Khaybar refused and instead hurt Abdullah ibn Umar, who suffered broken hand from their harassment. This prompted caliph Umar to expel the entire Jewish tribe from Khaybar, as now the properties in Khaybar were fully owned by the Muslim overlords.

=== During the Caliphate of Uthman ===
After the death of caliph Umar, Miqdad pledge his allegiance to Uthman who had just ascended as caliph. During the reign of caliph Uthman, Miqdad participated in further conquest of Africa where Miqdad was sent along with Abdullah bin Al-Zubayr, Abdullah bin Amr bin Al-Aas, Abdullah bin Abbas, as well as Abu Dhar Al-Ghafari, Miswar bin Makhrama to face the Byzantine army under Gregory in the battle of Sufetula.

Later, Miqdad, Shaddad ibn Aws and Ubadah ibn al-Samit joined the first caliphate naval armada built by Muawiyah to the Conquest of Arwad island in the offshore of Tartus. The mariners that conquered the island of Arwad under Muawiyah later continued their venture to the island of Cyprus. several authorities reported Miqdad was also among this naval enterprise to Cyprus. (Note: Al-Baladhuri, deemed this authority as weak due to it sourced from Al-Waqidi.) They departed from Acre.

According to Mahmud Shakir, the armada of Miqdad, Mu'awiyah, and Ubadah met with the naval forces from Africa which were led by Abdallah ibn Sa'd, who arrived in Cyprus before them. Then they joined their forces until they subdued the island of Cyprus from Byzantine garrisons. The Rashidun naval forces pacified almost every Byzantine garrison; which is supported by the evidence of two Greek inscriptions in the Cypriot village of Solois that cite the occurrence of first and second conquest of Cyprus, with around fifty small raids occurred in between. The entire island of Cyprus surrendered for the first time after their capital, Salamis, was surrounded and besieged for an unspecified time.

Before the canonization of Quran codex into one Mushaf under jurisdiction of caliph Uthman, the Qira'at of Miqdad is the one which was adhered by Muslims in Levant, particularly in Homs During his stay in Homs, Miqdad teaching Qur'an in the city.

=== Later life and death ===
It is recorded that a Christian slave of his once stated that he would make an incision into Miqdad's abdominal area and remove all the fat and then re-stitch the wound. However, this procedure resulted in contracting an infection which got worse until Miqdad succumbed to illness. As he was dying, Miqdad asked Zubayr ibn al-Awwam to manage and sell one of his estates which was left to his two children. Hasan ibn Ali and Husayn ibn Ali, each getting 18,000 dirhams from the endowment, while from the remainder he also asked Zubayr to give each of Muhammad's wives 7,000 dirhams.

Miqdad died in 33 AH in Damascus and is buried there. However, Tabari recorded that Miqdad was buried in al-Jurf, a place three miles west of Medina where the caliph Uthman led the ritual prayer of his death.

== Scholarship legacy ==
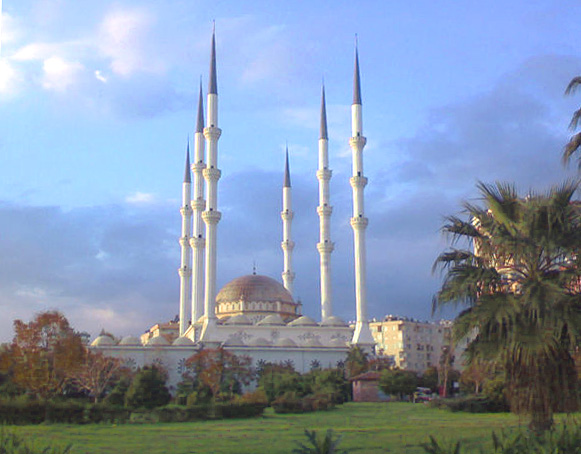
Muğdat mosque in Turkey, built in honor of Miqdad ibn Amr

Hadith that is transmitted by Miqdad became guidance rulings for Muslim scholars to formulate Sharia laws. Shafiʽi school Madhhab scholars cite the Hadith from Ali for the rule of war to take physical action against enemy of the State, based on when Miqdad and Zubayr were brought together with Ali on the instruction from Muhammad to pursue and capture Meccan polytheist spy who are on the way to inform the enemy regarding Muslims strategy. This ruling were codified in Kitab al-Umm which is authored by Al-Shafi'i.

Ibn Hajar al-Asqalani recorded in his book regarding the rulings from hadith, Fath al-Bari, the Sunnah which is practiced by Miqdad to throw mud or dust towards the face of flatterers or sychophants. The practice and encouragement of such conduct were also listed by Muhammad al-Bukhari in his book regarding ethics and manners towards peoples who gave praise excessively, which being responded with mud thrown by Miqdad.

In modern time, Muğdat Mosque was built a large mosque in Mersin, Turkey, in honor of Miqdad as early Sahabah.

== See also ==
- Aswad (name)
- Sunni view of the Sahaba
- Muğdat Mosque
- Muslim conquest of the Levant

== Bibliography ==
- Lynch, Ryan J. (July–September 2016). "Cyprus and Its Legal and Historiographical Significance in Early Islamic History". Journal of the American Oriental Society. 136 (3): 535–550. doi:10.7817/jameroriesoci.136.3.0535. JSTOR 10.7817/jameroriesoci.136.3.0535.
